= Punjabi Virsa 2018 =

2018 concert tour by Kamal Heer, Manmohan Waris, and Sangtar

- Tour by Kamal Heer, Manmohan Waris and Sangtar
- Location: Canada
- Start date: August 18, 2018
- End date: September 16, 2018
- No. of shows: 8

Kamal Heer, Manmohan Waris and Sangtar concert chronology
- Punjabi Virsa 2017 (2017); Punjabi Virsa 2018 (2018)

Punjabi Virsa 2018 was a concert tour by Kamal Heer, Manmohan Waris and Sangtar. This live musical Punjabi concert is performed every year in different countries since 2004 under title name Punjabi Virsa. This year it was performed in various cities of Canada in months of August and September 2018. It is presented by Plasma Records.

== Tour dates ==
Date	City	Country	Venue
18 August 2018	Edmonton	Canada	
19 August 2018	Calgary	Canada	
25 August 2018	Abbotsford	Canada	
1 September 2018	Victoria	Canada	
2 September 2018	Saskatoon	Canada	
8 September 2018	Winnipeg	Canada	
15 September 2018	Brampton	Canada	CAA Powerade Centre
16 September 2018	Montreal	Canada	

=== Tracks ===
All music composed by Sangtar.

Punjabi Virsa 2018 Canada
No.	Title	Artist(s)
1.	Masla Jhande da	Kamal Heer, Sangtar & Manmohan Waris

== See also ==
- Punjabi Virsa 2010
