= Mastin =

Mastin may refer to:

- Mastin House, historic residence in Mobile, Alabama
- Mastin Moor, village lying just east of Staveley in Derbyshire, United Kingdom
- Will Mastin Trio, dancers and singers Will Mastin, Sammy Davis Sr. and Sammy Davis Jr.

== Persons with the surname Mastin ==
- Francis Mastin Wright (1810–1869), Ohio politician
- James Mastin (1935–2016), American artist
- Reece Mastin (born 1994), British-Australian singer-songwriter
- Thomas J. Mastin (1839–1861), Confederate captain and lawyer
- Turner Mastin Marquette (1831–1894), Nebraska politician
- Will Mastin (1878–1979), American entertainer

== See also ==
- Masti (disambiguation)
- Mastini (disambiguation)
- Mastino (disambiguation)
