= Emblem of the East =

R15
"Symbol
of the East"
in hieroglyphs

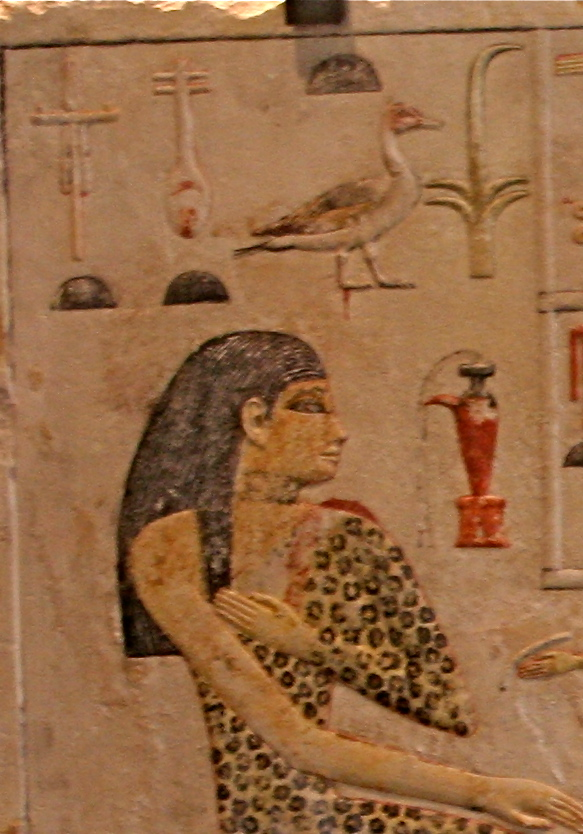
Slab stela close-up of Nefertiabet's name: nfr.t iꜣb.t, "Eastern Beauty".

The Egyptian hieroglyph Emblem of the East (𓋁 Gardiner no. R15) is a portrayal of a standard, surmounted by the "Symbol of the East". It represents the Goddess Iabet. Her companion goddess Imentet is represented by the "Emblem of the West". As an ideogram, it represents either iꜣbt "east" or iꜣby "left". The symbol for the "West"/"right" was considered 'good', and thus the East symbol sometimes symbolized the opposite of good, evil. However, as the sun rises in the East, the solar cult often used the symbol.

== See also ==
- List of hieroglyphs/R
- Iabet
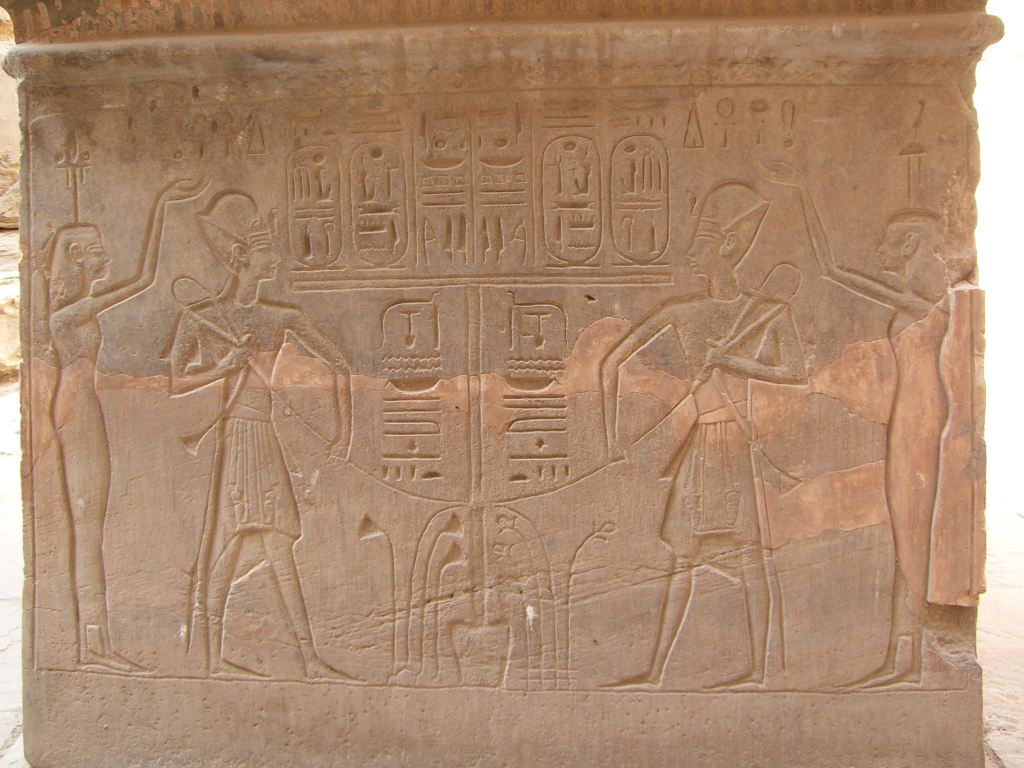
Relief showing Emblem of the East, and Emblem of the West

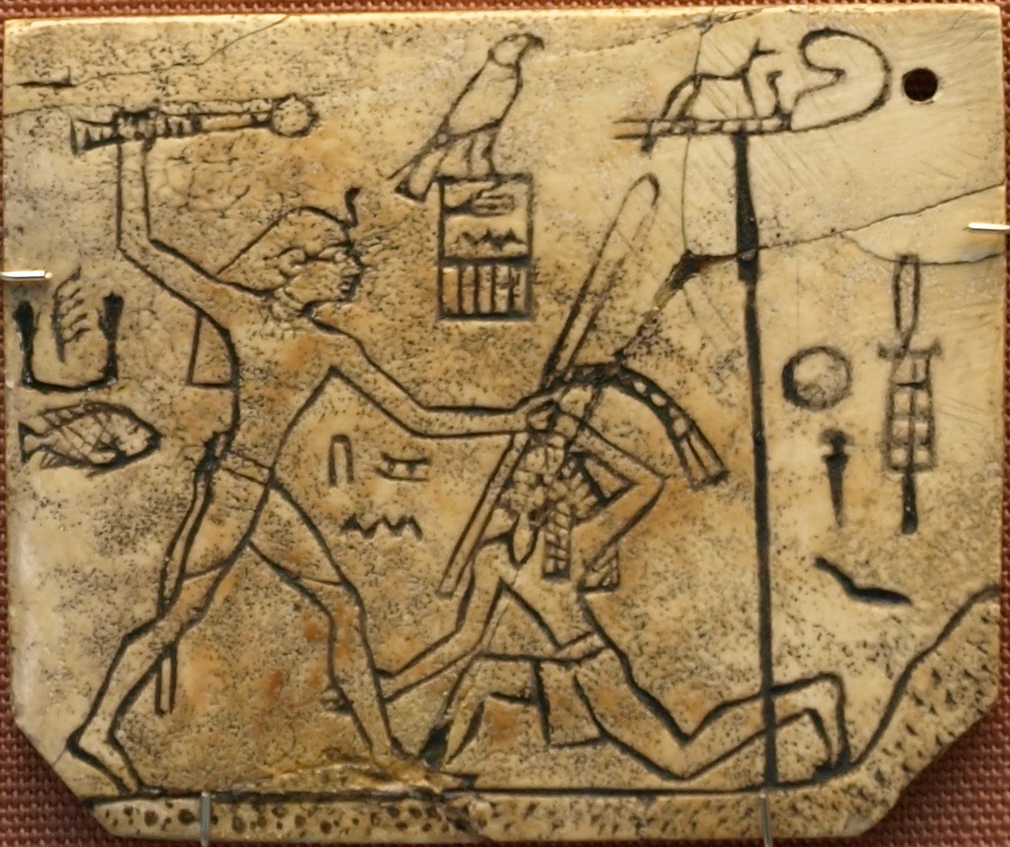
Label of Pharaoh Den
