= Masti =

Masti may refer to:

- Masti (film series), an Indian comedy film series by Indra Kumar
  - Masti (2004 film), an Indian comedy thriller, the first installment in the series
  - Masti 2 or Grand Masti, 2013 film, the second installment in the series
  - Masti 3 (film) or Great Grand Masti, 2016 film, the third installment in the series
- Masti (2007 film), an Indian Kannada-language film
- Masti-Kanthay Vala, Masti 2 and Masti 3, albums by Kamal Heer
- Masti, Estonia, a village
- Ashok Masti (fl. from 2004), an Indian playback singer
- Masti Venkatesha Iyengar (1891–1986), an Indian writer of Kannada literature

== See also ==
- Mast (disambiguation)
- Mastana (disambiguation)
- "Masti Masti", a song by Shweta Mohan and Sooraj Santhosh from the 2016 Indian film Nenu Sailaja
- Masti's, an Indian TV series
