= Masthead =

Masthead may refer to:

- The top of a sailing mast
  - Masthead rig, a method of rigging a sailing vessel

== Publishing ==
- Masthead (American publishing), details of the owners, publisher, contributors etc. of a newspaper or periodical (UK: "publisher's imprint")
- Masthead (British publishing), the banner name on the front page of a newspaper or periodical (US: "nameplate")
- Masthead Maine, formerly a network of newspapers in Maine

== Other uses ==
- Masthead Studios, a Bulgarian video game developer specializing in massively multiplayer online role-playing games
- Mast Head Amplifier, an amplifier connected directly to a mobile antenna mast

== See also ==
- Mast (disambiguation)
