= Preet Sanghreri =

- Born: 13 December 1983 (age 42); Sanghreri
- Origin: Sanghreri, Punjab, India
- Occupations: Lyricist, writer, singer
- Years active: 2008–present

Preet Sanghreri is an Indian artist, lyricist and singer associated with Punjabi music. His real name is 'Chamkaur Singh Ghuman' He is known for his songs with notable Punjabi Singers – Manmohan Waris, Kamal Heer, Nachhatar Gill, Roshan Prince, Deep Dhillon, Mannat Noor, Miss Pooja, Lakhwinder Wadali & Ravinder Grewal. He rose to fame with Ravinder Grewal's Blockbuster Song – Lovely V/s PU.

== Career ==
He started his career as a writer, He has written the following books.

S. No	Name of Book	Year	Publisher
1	Mere Haani	2008	Lokgeet Prakashan Chandigarh
2	Mere Pind di Phirni	2009	Lokgeet Prakashan Chandigarh
3	Antim Icha	2010	Lokgeet Prakashan Chandigarh
4	Moh Diyan Tandan	2011	Lokgeet Prakashan Chandigarh
5	Kalman De Haal	2013	Lokgeet Prakashan Chandigarh
6	Loh Pursh	2016	Ghuman Publication Sangrur

== Discography as a Lyricist ==
As a Lyricist, he has given 60+ songs to Punjabi music industry till date.

S. No	Year	Music Album/Single Track	Music Director	Singer	Record
1	2009	Attwaad	Manmohan Waris Music Group	Manmohan Waris	Etc Punjabi
2	2009	Tera Moh	Tarun Rishi	G.S Peter / Renu Navneet	Goyal Music
3	2010	Roz Roz Di Peeni	Raju Bablu	Deep Dhillon / Jassi Jaismeen	SMI
4	2010	Ki Hoya Je Badnaam	Sheera Jasvir Music Group	Sheera Jasvir	Speed Records
5	2012	Club Vich	DNA	Kamal Heer	Plasma Moviebox Records
6	2013	Maa	Jatinder Jeetu	Lakhwinder Wadali	Speed Records
7	2013	Main Nange Pairi Nachi	Sonu Bhaghat	Miss Pooja	T-Series
8	2014	Lovely V/s PU	DJ Flow	Ravinder Grewal / Shipra Goyal	Tedi Pag Records
9	2016	Ford 3600	Raj Yashraj	Deep Dhillon / Jassi Jaismeen	Amar Audio
10	2017	3600 Return	Music Empire	Deep Dhillon / Jassi Jaismeen	Urban Pendu Music
11	2019	Ja Ke Chandigarh	Sachin Ahuja	Deep Dhillon / Jassi Jaismeen	Mad 4 Music
12	2020	Ranjhna	Jassi Brothers	Tanya Gill	Tudu Records
13	2020	Jatt Karjai	Nixon Boy	Ravinder Grewal	Tedi Pag Records

== Discography as a Lyricist in films ==
S. No	Year	Film	Track	Music Director	Singer	Production House
1	2019	Nanka Mel	Title Track	Music Empire	Nachhatar Gill	Kar Productions
2	2019	Nanka Mel	Rabb Naal	Gurmeet Singh	Roshan Prince and Mannat Noor	Kar Productions

== Singing career ==
He debuted as a singer with Pakki Sarpanchi.

S. No	Year	/Single Track	Music Director	Record
1	2018	Pakki Sarpanchi	Music Empire	Mad 4 Music
2	2019	Mann Ki Baat	Music Empire	VS Records
3	2022	Vaaje Aale	Music Empire	Jass Records

== Education ==
Preet Sanghreri holds the following degrees. Currently, he is pursuing PhD in Punjabi from Punjabi University, Patiala.

S. No	Class	Year of Passing	Institute
1	B.A	2004	Govt. Ranbir College, Sangrur.
2	M.A (Hindi)	2007	Punjabi University, Patiala.
3	PGDCA	2007	Punjab Technical University, Jalandhar.
4	MSc (IT)	2009	Punjab Technical University, Jalandhar.
5	BEd	2010	Govt. State College, Patiala.
6	MCA	2010	Punjab Technical University, Jalandhar.
7	M.A (Punjabi)	2013	Punjabi University, Patiala.
8	M.Phill	2016	Desh Bhagat University, Mandi Gobindgarh.
9	PhD	Pursuing	Punjabi University, Patiala.
