= Mast =

Mast, MAST or MASt may refer to:

== Engineering ==
- Mast (sailing), a vertical spar on a sailing ship
- Mast (naval), the structure used to mount navigation and communication receivers on a modern ship
- Flagmast, a pole for flying a flag
- Guyed mast, a structure supported by guy-wires
- Mooring mast, a structure for docking an airship
- Radio masts and towers, towers that carry antennas
- The primary support for a helicopter rotor
- The main vertical structure of a forklift truck
- Multi-axis shaker table, an automotive test system
- Model for assessment of telemedicine, used to assess long-distance medical treatment

== Biology ==
- Mast (botany), the edible parts of woody plants
- Mast Arboretum, at Stephen F. Austin State University in Nacogdoches, Texas
- Mast cell, involved in the allergy response
- Mast., in botanical naming, the standard author abbreviation for Maxwell T. Masters
- Two microtubule-associated serine/threonine-protein kinase enzymes:
  - MAST1, an enzyme that in humans is encoded by the MAST1 gene
  - MAST2, an enzyme that in humans is encoded by the MAST2 gene
- MAST (MArine STramenopiles), clades of environmental DNA sequences from uncultured stramenopile microorganisms obtained in marine ecosystems.

== Science ==
- Multi-Application Survivable Tether, an experimental space mission
- Multimission Archive at STScI, a component of the National Space Science Data Center
- Mega Ampere Spherical Tokamak, a nuclear fusion experiment in the UK
- Mikulski Archive for Space Telescopes in Maryland, USA

== Society and culture ==
- Captain's Mast, in naval tradition, a military non-judicial disciplinary hearing
- Mast (hieroglyph), an Egyptian language triliteral
- Mast (Sufism), in India, Pakistan, and Iran, a type of religious intoxication
  - Mast (Meher Baba), in the philosophy of Indian mystic Meher Baba
- Mast (film), a 1999 Indian movie by Ram Gopal Verma
- Mast General Store, an American regional store chain

== Places ==
- Mast-e Olya, a village in Markazi Province, Iran
- Mast-e Sofla, a village in Markazi Province, Iran

== Organizations ==
- Maritime Archaeology Sea Trust, a UK-based charity
- Masters And slaves Together (MAsT), an international BDSM organization
- Municipal Ambulance Services Trust, an EMS provider in Kansas City, Missouri

== Schools and education ==
- Marine Academy of Science and Technology, a school in Sandy Hook, New Jersey
- MAST Academy (Maritime and Science Technology Academy), a school in Miami, Florida
  - MAST Academy @ Homestead Medical Magnet, a school in Homestead, Florida
  - José Martí MAST 6-12 Academy, a school in Hialeah, Florida
- Master of Advanced Studies (MASt), a degree offered by some universities

== Other uses ==
- Mast (surname), a surname
- Mast (musician), American jazz artist
- Yogurt in Persian and Kurdish
- Michigan Alcohol Screening Test, a test for alcoholism
- Military anti-shock trousers, a medical device

== See also ==
- Masti (disambiguation)
