= Mast (hieroglyph) =

Egyptian hieroglyph

P7
Mast
hieroglyph #2
in hieroglyphs

P6
Ship's Mast
in hieroglyphs

The ancient Egyptian Mast hieroglyph is one of the oldest language hieroglyphs from Ancient Egypt. It is used on a famous label of Pharaoh Den of the First dynasty, but forms part of the location hieroglyph: Emblem of the East.

Nectanebo II's obelisk uses the Mast hieroglyph when describing the construction of his obelisk; in a S-Egyptian emphatic word construct he adds a vertical S, the folded cloth, Gardiner no. S29, S29, at the beginning of the word "to erect". (see here, high res: , low res: )

The Ship's Mast hieroglyph is used as a triliteral phonetic hieroglyphic to represent the sound sequence ꜥḥꜥ, which means "to stand erect", or "to stand vertical"; its use is extensive throughout the language history, and hieroglyphic tomb reliefs and story-telling of Ancient Egypt. It is possibly a forerunner hieroglyph kh3, the sun rising upon the horizon.

In the 198 BC Rosetta Stone, the ship's mast hieroglyph has the unique usage in the final line of the Ptolemy V decree: the mast is used twice-(adjective, verb):

engrave the decree..: "...upon a vertical-(mast) stone stele"..in the 3-language scripts, .."Shall be made to stand it in the sanctuaries in temples all..."

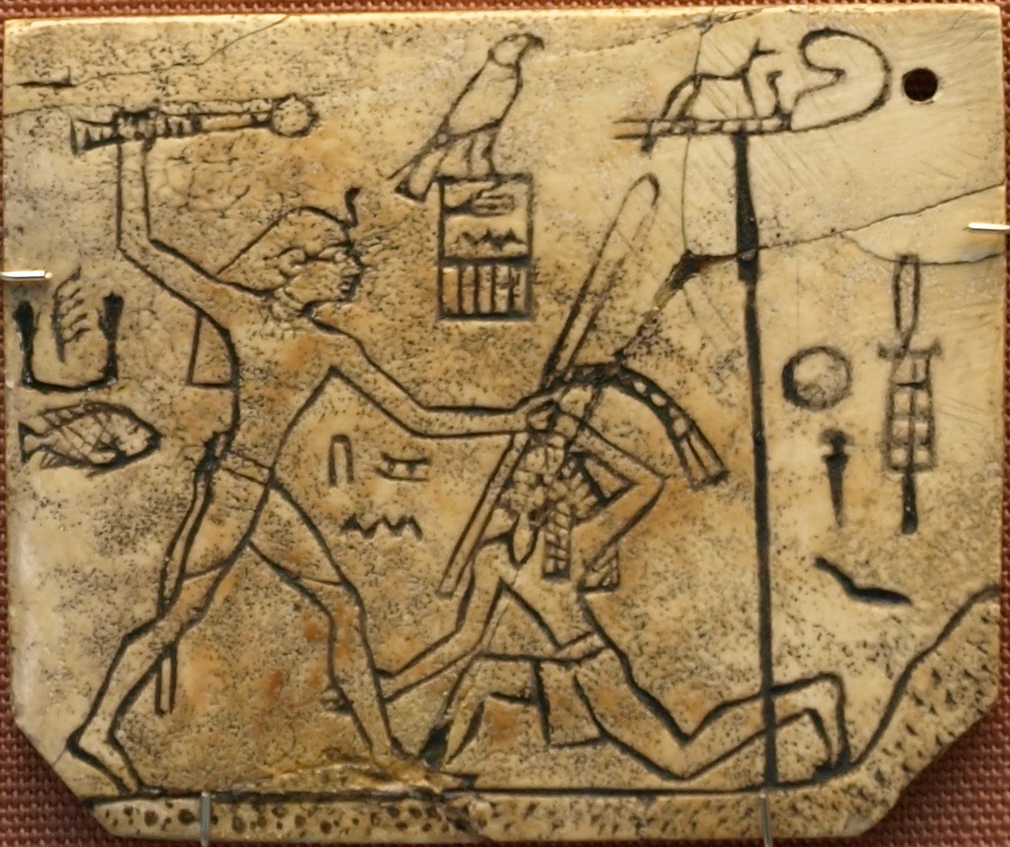
Ship's Mast on label of Pharaoh Den, 1st Dynasty

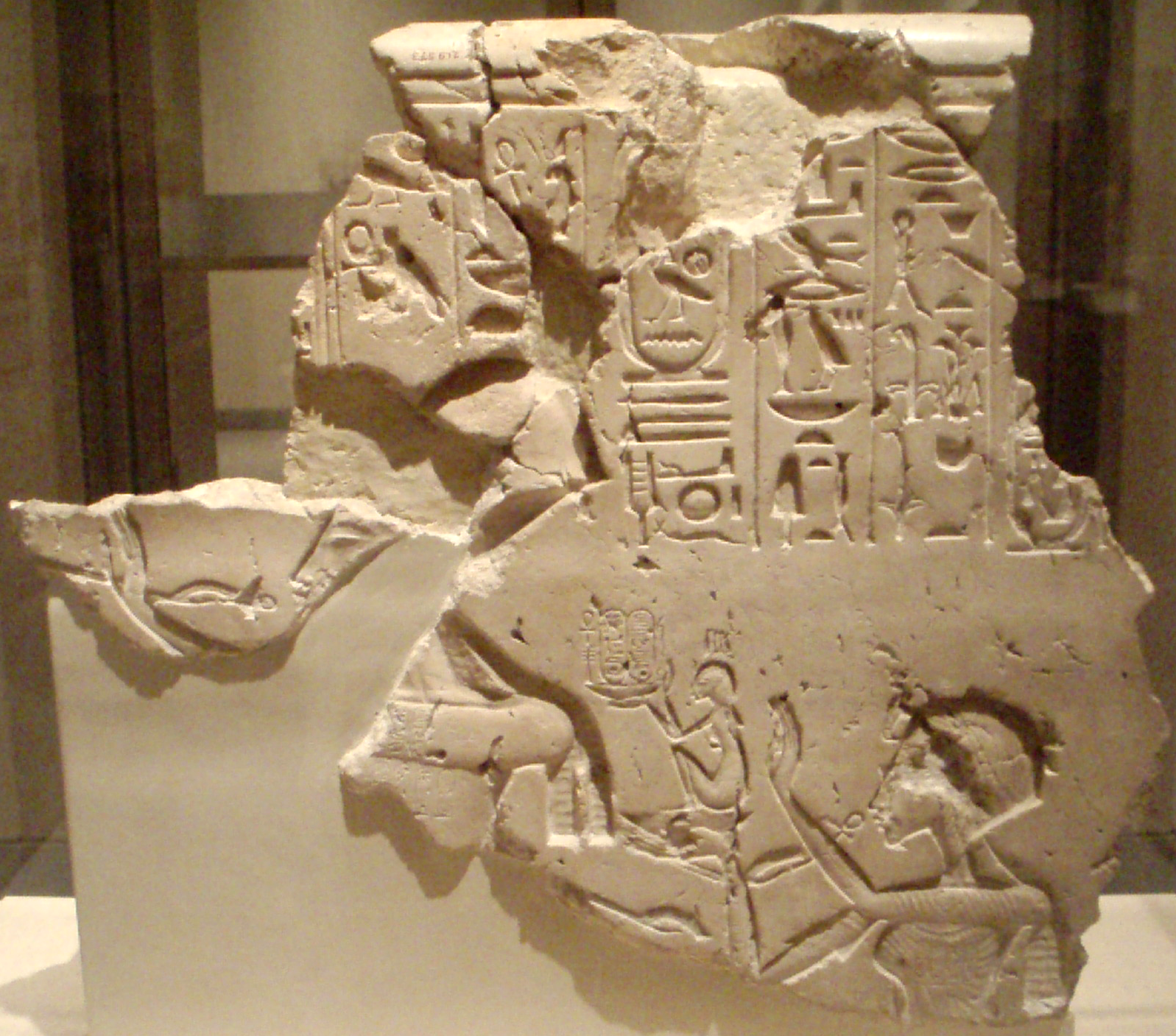
From right, hieroglyphs: sedge of the South, Papyrus clump with leaves of North-Nile Delta, wife-hieroglyph, the tree-hieroglyph, and the Ship's Mast hieroglyph

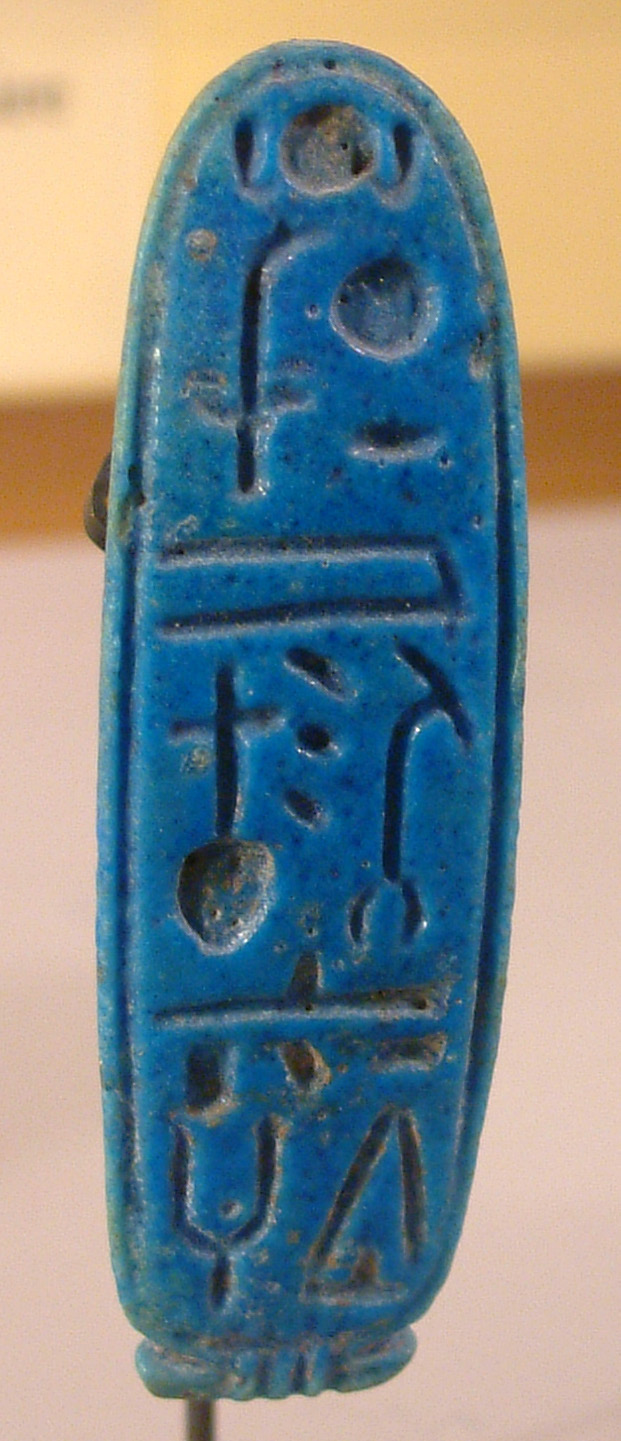
Cartouche amulet, with variant form of mast hieroglyph

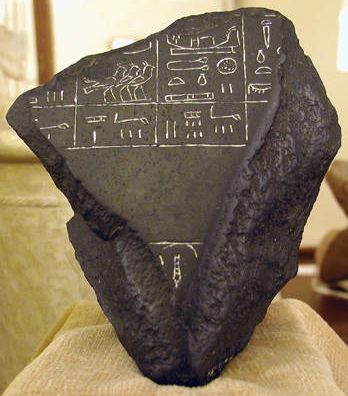
Old Kingdom of Ancient Egypt: Palermo stone fragment

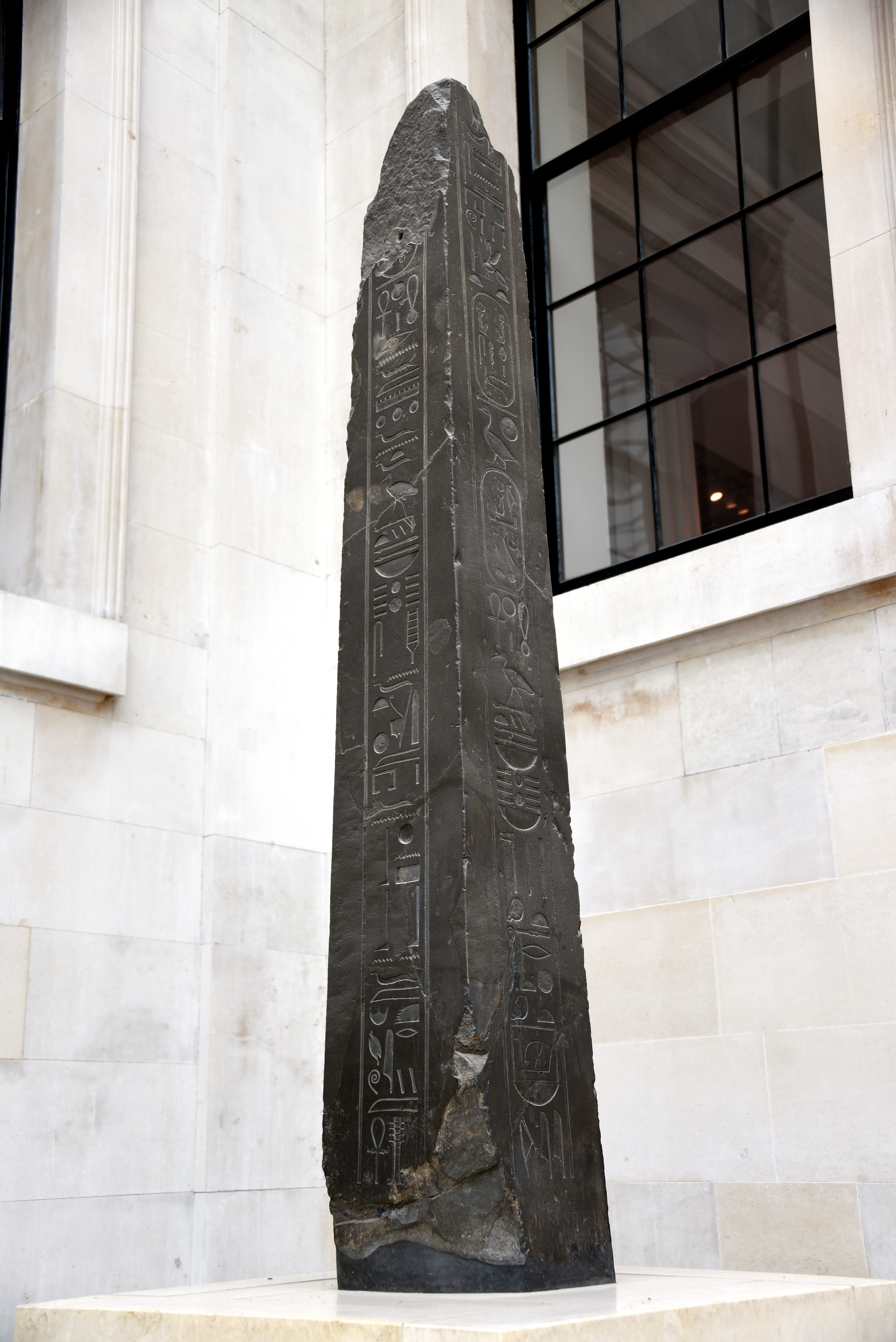
Nectanebo II obelisk, stating that he 'erected' the obelisk, (using the Mast-hieroglyph)

== See also ==
- Gardiner's Sign List#P. Ships and Parts of Ships
- Gardiner's Sign List#U. Agriculture, Crafts, and Professions
- List of Egyptian hieroglyphs by common name: M-Z
- Mast
