= Sehener =

Ancient Egyptian princess

- Daughter of the king
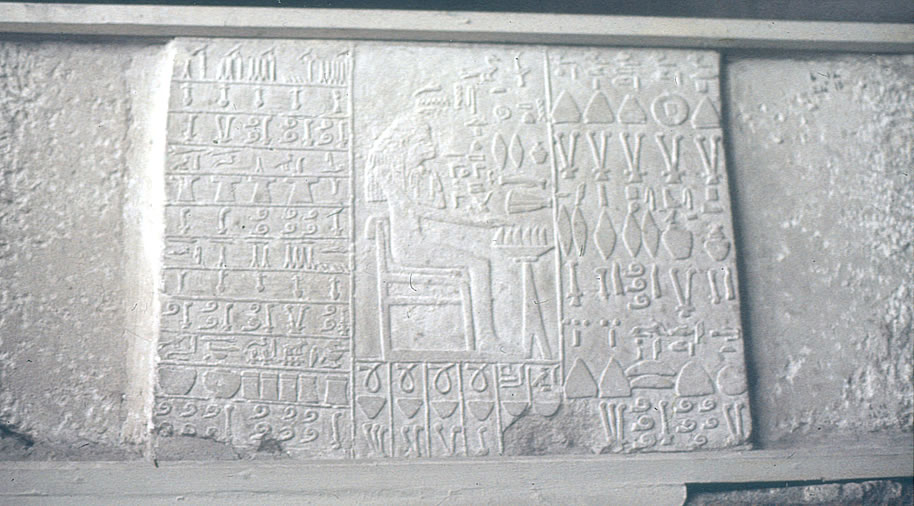
- The richly decorated slab stela of Sehener.
Egyptian name
S29 V28 F20 n r Ṣḥnr

Sehener (alternatively read as Seheneser and Sehefener) was an ancient Egyptian princess living during the late 2nd Dynasty. It is disputed as to who was the king (pharaoh) who reigned during Sehener's lifetime.

== Identity ==
Sehener's name seems to be difficult to read, different scholars propose different alternative readings: James Edward Quibell proposes Sehener and Seheneser, Hartwig Altenmüller instead reads Sehefener.

Sehener is attested only by her decorated slab stela. Next to nothing is known about her life, except for her title as a princess. However, the richly decorated slab stela might point out that Sehener was pretty wealthy and of some importance. It is also unknown, whose daughter exactly she was. The decoration style leads Egyptologists such as James Edward Quibell and Hartwig Altenmüller to a datation at the time between the midst and end of 2nd Dynasty.

=== Titles ===
As a princess, Sehener bore several elite and pious titularies:

- Daughter of the king (Egyptian: Sat-nesw).

=== Slab stela ===
Sehener's slab stela was found by James Edward Quibell in the heavily damaged burial chamber of mastaba 2146-E in Saqqara. It is made of fine polished limestone and measures 112 x 52 cm. The offering scene lies in the center of the slab and takes 57 x 42 cm of space.

Sehener is depicted as a seated woman, she wears a finely curled hair fashion ending in long, delicate dreadlocks. She is dressed in a tight gown which is knotted together above her left shoulder, the knot is made of a lanyard in shape of the Tijt-knot. The lady also wears a delicate pearl necklace. Sehener looks to the right and reaches out for some sort of bread or cake on an offering table. The right half of the apparition window is decorated with the common arrangement of offering foods.

The whole offering table scene in turn is surrounded by a vast storage list in shape of neatly settled compartments. Each compartment provides the exact labelling of each good in hieroglyphs, together with a miniature of the item itself. Additionally, hieroglyphic numbers give the amount of each grave good – Sehener's stela may be the earliest known example to do so.

== Tomb ==
Sehener's tomb was the small mastaba 2146-E at Saqqara. The tomb is heavily damaged and most of the interior has been destroyed by grave robbers. The interior consisted of a simple corridor ending in a single burial chamber. The burial chamber is thought to be the original place of display for the slab stela, as it was usual for the Second Dynasty.
