= Iabet =

Ancient Egyptian deity

Name in hieroglyphs
iAb b t xAst
- Major cult center: Panopolis
- Consort: Min

Iabet (Iabtet, Iab, Abet, Abtet, Ab) is a goddess in Egyptian mythology, counterpart of Imentet. She wore the Emblem of the East, in contrast to Imentet's Emblem of the West.

== Mythology ==
She is a cleanser of the Sun god Ra, and goddess of the east. Her main husband is the fertility god Min. She was worshiped in Panopolis, with her husband.

In the Amduat, Iabet is depicted as a woman with her arms by her sides, under the name of Iab. Along with eleven other goddesses, including Isis and her grandmother Tefnut, the group was known as "Those who give praises to Ra as he passes over Wernes".
