= Moti Chun Ke =

Greatest hits album by Kamal Heer
- Released: 17 June 2008
- Recorded: 2000–2007
- Genre: Punjabi, Sad
- Length: 48 Minutes
- Label: Plasma Records
- Producer: Sangtar

Kamal Heer chronology
Chan Jiha Gabhru (2007)	Moti Chun Ke (2008)	Jinday Ni Jinday (2009)

Moti Chun Ke is a sad song collection by Punjabi singer Kamal Heer. The music was composed and produced by Sangtar.

== Track listing ==
All music is composed by Sangtar.

Moti Chun Ke
No.	Title	Lyrics	Original Album	Length
1.	"Moti Chun Ke"	Charan Likhari	Chan Jiha Gabhru	4:37
2.	"Yaad Aegi"	Malkiat Meet	Masti-Kanthay Vala	4:14
3.	"Dila Meria"	Davinder Khannewala	Kamli	5:01
4.	"Poonian Da Rang"	Mangal Hathur	Masti 2	5:24
5.	"Yaad Kar Kar Ke"	Mangal Hathur	Masti Three	4:57
6.	"Sharab Vichon Tohlde Pae"	Debi Makhsoospuri	Masti 2	5:58
7.	"Chan Meria"	Mangal Hathur	Masti Three	5:33
8.	"Yeh Kaise Yaarane Hai"	Debi Makhsoospuri	Kamli	4:57
9.	"Akhari Salaam"	Debi Makhsoospuri	Masti-Kanthay Vala	4:28
10.	"Hathiar Na Chaliye"	Mangal Hathur	Chan Jiha Gabhru	3:34
Total length:				48:43

== Award nominations ==
Moti Chun Ke was nominated for "Best Folk-Pop Album" at the 2009 PTC Punjabi Music Awards. Also the song "Hathiar Na Chaliye" got Kamal Heer nominated for "Best Folk-Pop Vocalist".
