= Mast (surname) =

Mast is a surname. Notable people with the surname include:

- Austin Mast (born 1972), American botanist
- Brian Mast (b. 1980), American Florida congressman
- Dennis Mast (born 1992), German footballer
- Dick Mast (born 1951), American professional golfer
- Emily Mast (born 1976), American artist
- Günter Mast, German manager
- Katja Mast (born 1971), German politician
- Maura Mast, Irish-American mathematician
- Peggy Mast (fl. 20th/21st century), American politician
- Rick Mast (born 1957), American NASCAR driver
- Wilhelm Mast, founder of Mast-Jägermeister

Mast is also a given name, and may refer to:

- Mast Ali, Indian actor
