= Goddess of the West =

Goddess of the West may refer to:

- Hathor, the "Mistress of the West", in Egyptian mythology
  - Imentet, the "Goddess of the West" in Egyptian mythology, who may have simply been an attribute of Hathor or Isis
- Xi Wangmu, the "Queen Mother of the West", in Chinese mythology
