= Nefertiabet =

Ancient Egyptian princess

- Princess of Egypt
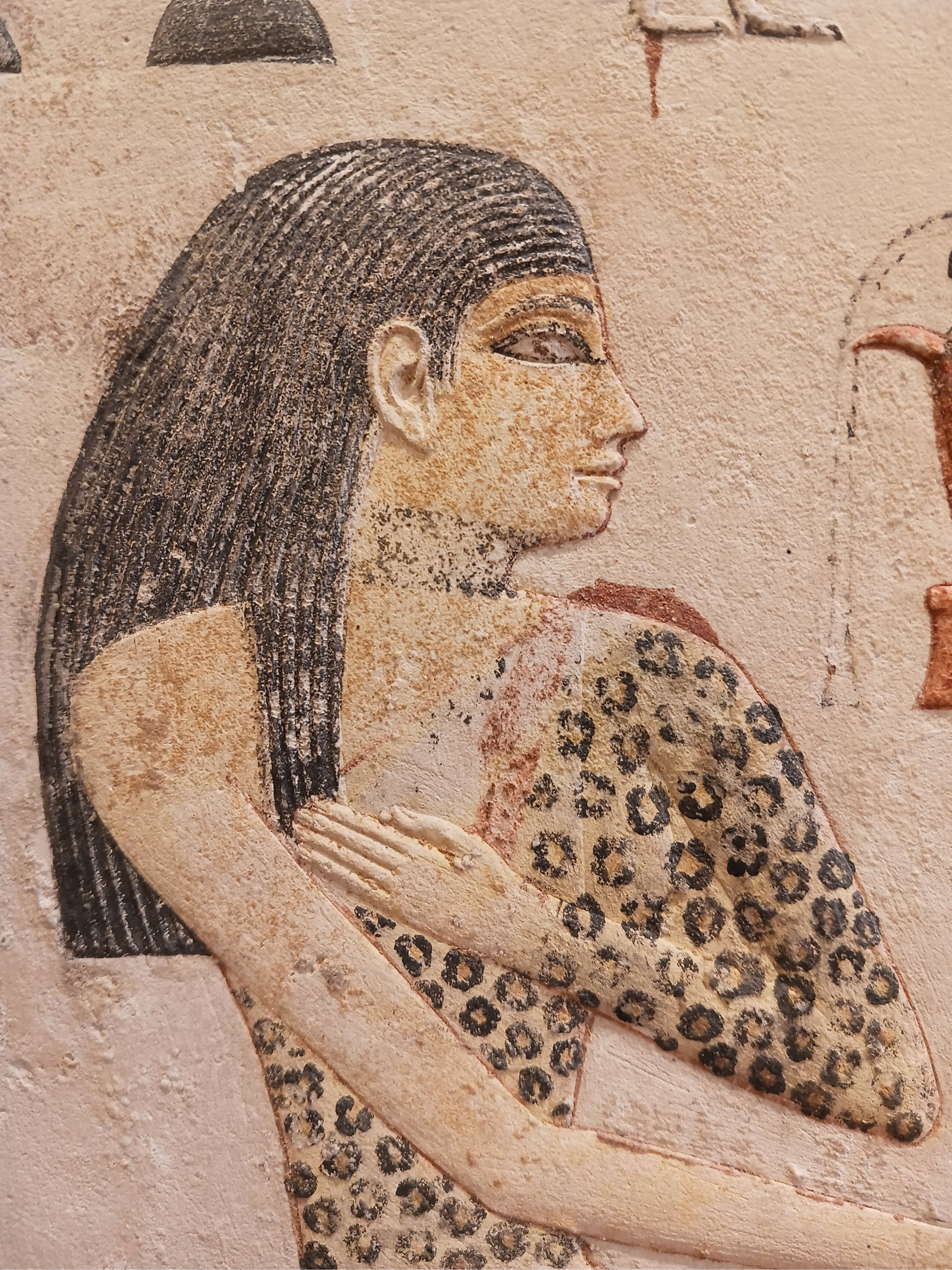
- Princess Nefertiabet "daughter of the King", ca. 2580 BCE. The original colors of the stele were well preserved to this day, including her skin color.
- Born: Nefertiabet
- Father: Possibly Khufu, more likely Sneferu

Nefertiabet in hieroglyphs
nfr t R15 t
Neferetiabet (Neferet iabet)
Nfr.t jꜣb.t

Nefertiabet ("Nefert-Yabet", nfrt-jꜣbt; "Beautiful One of the East") was an ancient Egyptian princess of the 4th Dynasty. She may have been a daughter of Pharaoh Khufu, but was most likely his sister, and a daughter of Sneferu.

She lived around the reign of Khufu/Kheops (ca. 2589-2566 BCE). Based on the analysis of her tomb, she was likely buried circa 2580 BCE, in the middle of Khufu's reign.

== Tomb ==
Her tomb at Giza is known (Giza West Field, Mastaba G 1225). The mastaba is about 24.25 x 11.05 m. in size. The tomb originally contained one shaft, which contained the burial of Nefertiabet. The shaft comprises a passage and a chamber. Fragments of a white limestone coffin with a flat lid were found. A canopic pit had been dug in one of the corners of the chamber. The chamber contained several bowls and jars. An annex with one additional burial shaft was added later, but was found emptied.

Her mastaba is one of the earliest to have been built in Cemetery 1200 near the Great Pyramid, dating it to the first decade of Khufu’s reign, in the middle of his reign.

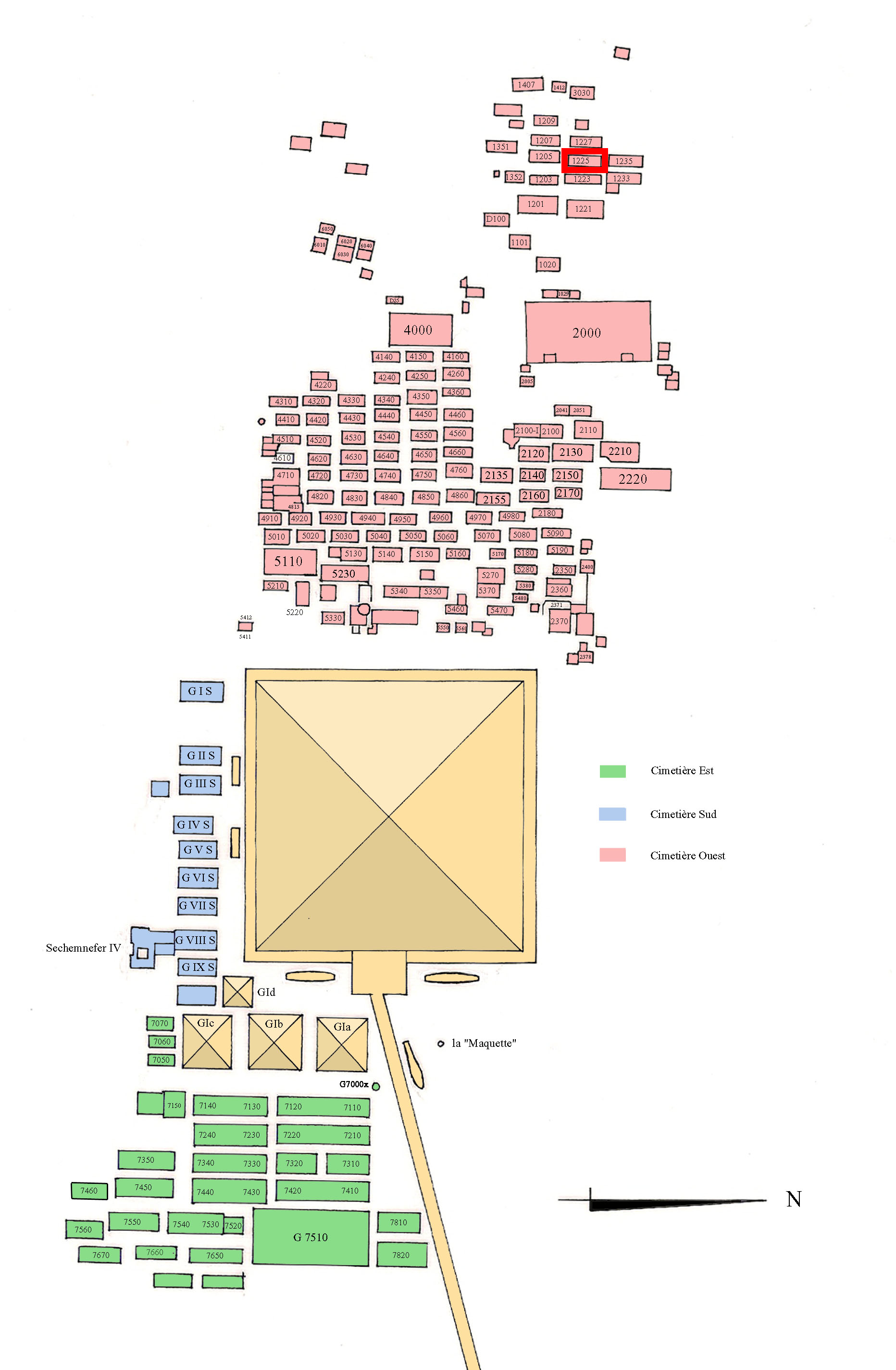
Tomb of Nefertiabet (G 1225), next to the Great Pyramid of Cheops

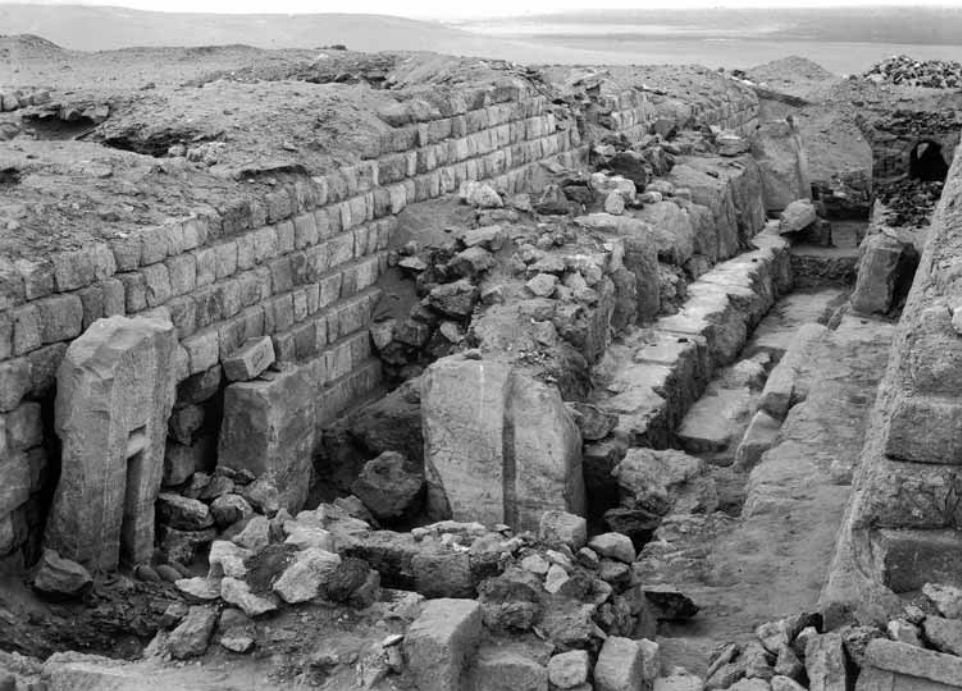
Chapel area with reconstructed facade of Tomb G 1225 (1905)

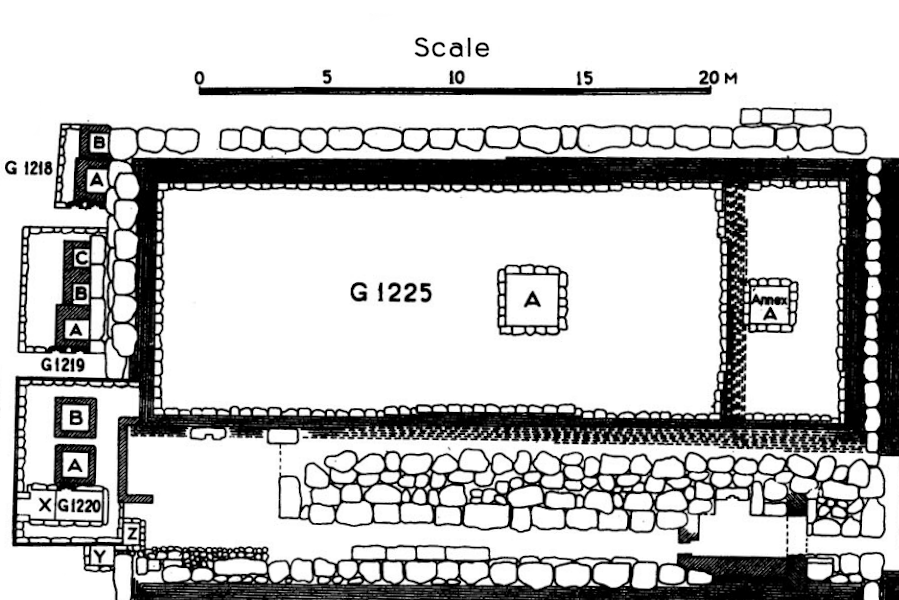
Plan of Tomb G 1225

A statue of her, now in Munich, may originate from her tomb, but there is a high probability that this is intrusive, and that the statue was excavated from a different tomb. Stylistically, it is also quite removed from the quality of the Nefertiabet stela, which raises further doubt about attribution.

=== Stela ===
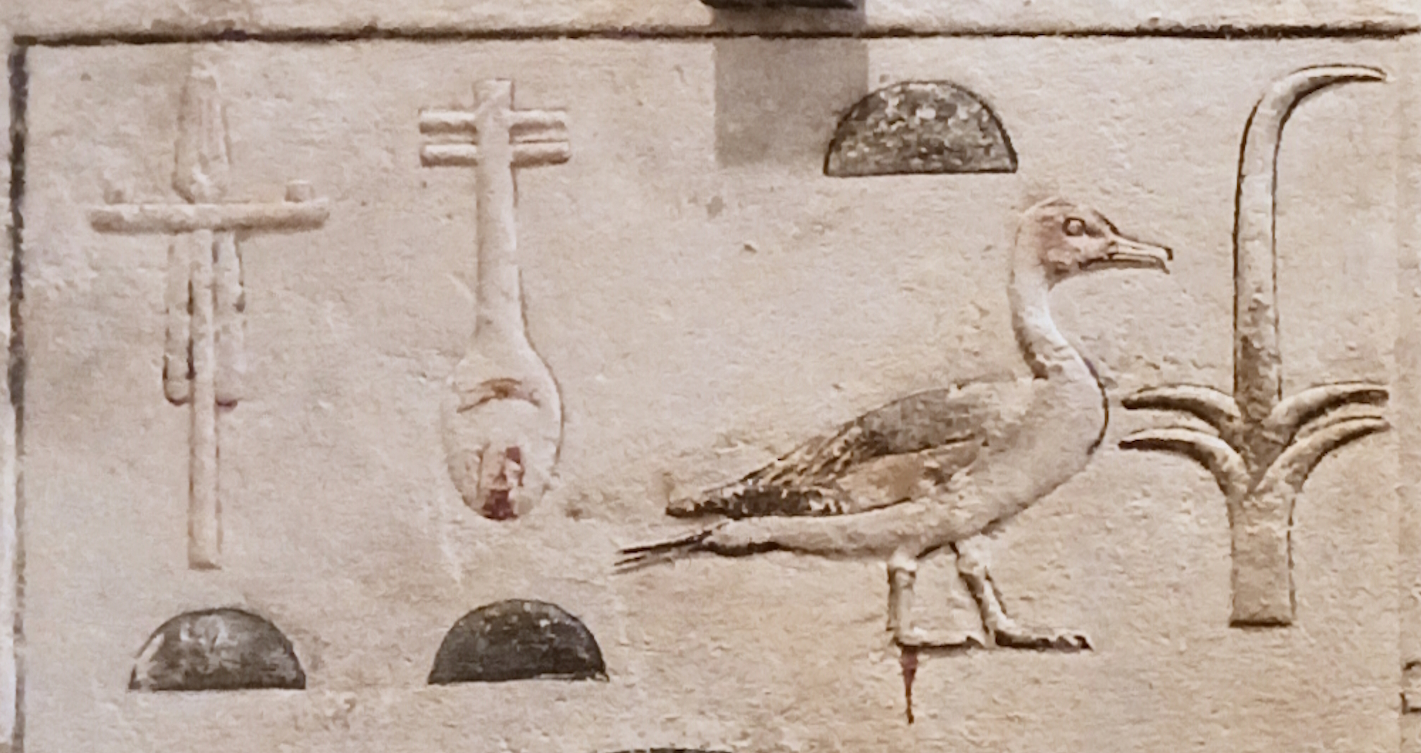
Mention "The King's daughter, Nefertiabet", on her stela

There is a well-known slab stela depicting the princess in front of her food for the afterlife, that is now in the Louvre. It is a well-preserved stela, complete with red, yellow, black, and green colors. The original colors of her tomb were well preserved to this day, including her yellow skin color. The stela was located on the outer wall of her tomb at Giza, at the foot of the Great Pyramid. Nefertiabet is shown seated facing right, clothed in panther skin, and seated on a chair with carvings a bull's feet and papyrus umbels. Above her is the inscription "the king's daughter Nefertiabet".

An offering table in front of her bears reeds, as is common, indicating "[the products of the] field", as well as sundry other foodstuffs. Under the table offerings are depicted including linen and ointment on the left, and on the right offerings of bread, beer, oryx, and bull. On the right of the slab a linen list is depicted.

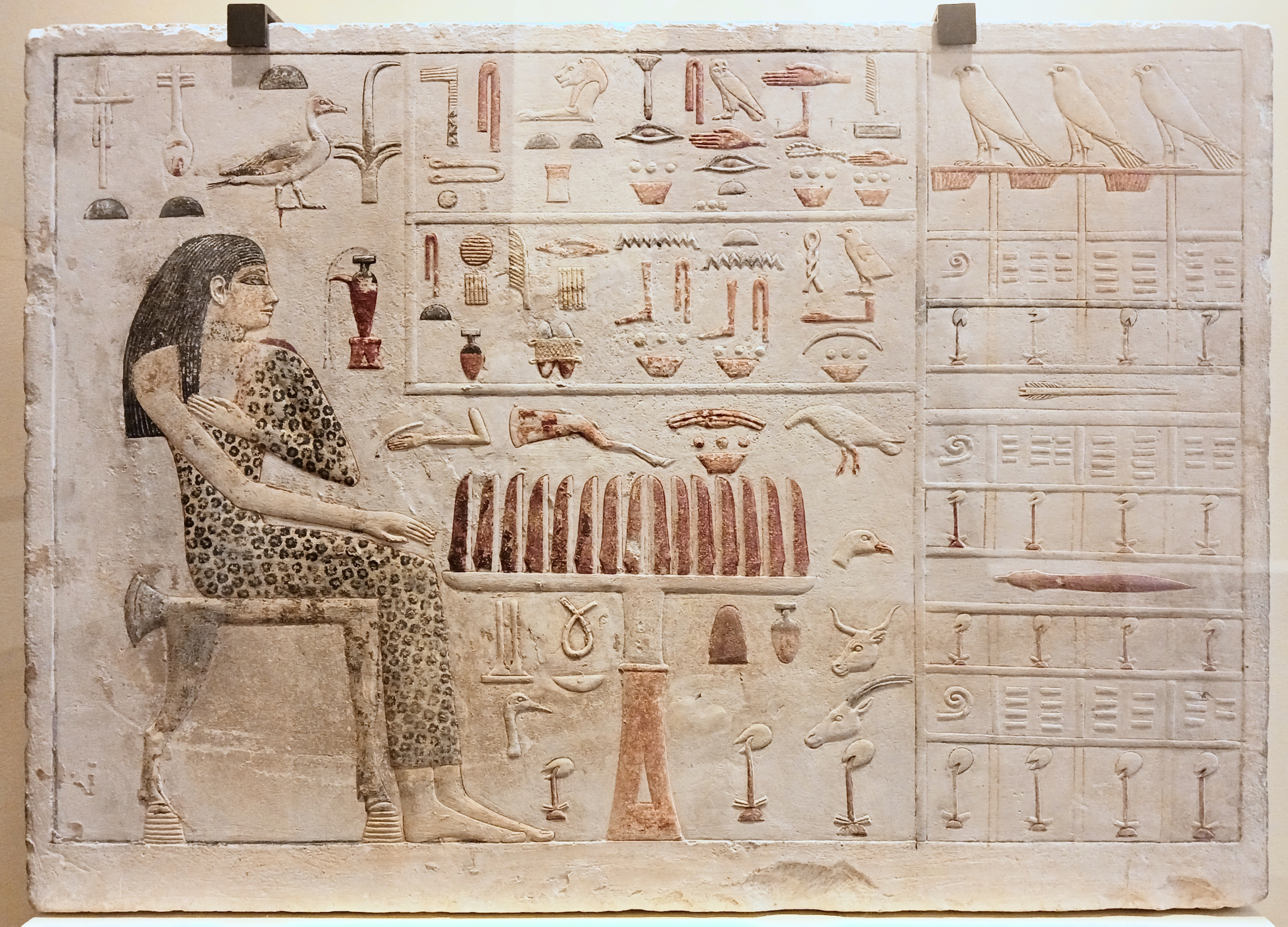
Nefertiabet's stela from her tomb in Giza. Louvre Museum

== External link ==
Neferitabet slab stela in the Louvre catalogue
