= Mastana =

Mastana may refer to:

- Mastana (1954 film), a 1954 Indian Hindi film
- Mastana (1970 film), a 1970 Indian Hindi film
- Murtaza Hassan (c. 1955–2011), commonly known as Mastana, Pakistani comedian

== See also ==
- Masti (disambiguation)
- Mastan, a 2004 Indian film
- Mastan Vali, an Indian politician
- Haji Mastan, an Indian gangster
- Mastani, 18th-century Indian queen of the Maratha empire, wife of Bajirao I
