= Jinday Ni Jinday =

Studio album by Kamal Heer
- Released: 21 November 2009; CanadaUnited States; 25 November 2009; United KingdomIndia
- Recorded: June–October 2009
- Genre: Punjabi, Bhangra, sad, folk, classical
- Length: 35 Minutes
- Label: Plasma
- Producer: Sangtar

Kamal Heer chronology
Moti Chun Ke (2008)	Jinday Ni Jinday (2009)

Jinday Ni Jinday is Punjabi singer Kamal Heer's sixth studio album. It released on 21 November 2009 in Canada and the United States and 25 November 2009 worldwide on Plasma Records.

== Tracks ==
All music is composed by Sangtar.

Jinday Ni Jinday
No.	Title	Lyrics	Length
1.	"Pendu Jatt"	Preet Khetla	3:46
2.	"Jinday Ni Jinday"	Jasbir Gunachauria	5:01
3.	"Mul Morta"	Sangtar	3:58
4.	"Haal Puchh Lai"	Ninder Sher Khan	4:57
5.	"Ik Boli"	Anil Fattegarh Jattan	4:04
6.	"Chetay Kareen"	Sukhpal Aujla	5:25
7.	"Nashedi Dil"	Sangtar	3:57
8.	"Punjab (Live)" (Featuring Ustad Tari Khan on tabla)	Charan Likhari	3:25
Total length:			34:37

== About ==
Jinday Ni Jinday was recorded from June 2009 to September 2009 at Windlass Studios, Mumbai, India and Grind Music and Sound Studios, Los Angeles, United States. The release was delayed from September 2009 to November 2009. The music was composed by Sangtar and lyricists were Jasbir Gunachauria, Charan Likhari, Anil Fattegarh Jattan, Sukhpal Aujla, Preet Khetla, Ninder Sher Khan and Sangtar. The musicians of this album were Ustad Tari Khan, Ramzan Khavra, Atul Raninga, Raju Shankar, Sandeep Saxena, Sanjeev Sain, Sharafat Hussain, Naveen Sharma, Raju Sardar and Iqbal Azad, Jugal Kishore, Pardeep Thakur, Jude Alexander, Sanju Verma, S. Jawda, Mohan Goyal, Neeraj Rath, Parbhat-Jugal Kishore, Rashid Khan, Jatinder Thakur, Madhukant Dhumal, Dilshad Khan, Gaja, Pardeep Barot, Kamal Heer and Sangtar. Bharat Gosher, the great film rhythm programmer has programmed some of the music. The last song of this album,"Punjab", was recorded live at Fiasco Bros Studio, Vancouver, British Columbia, Canada, when the Tabla virtuoso Ustad Tari Khan was in town. He recorded the song along with Kamal Heer. Michelle Garuik mixed and mastered the album at Grind Music and Sound Studios, Los Angeles. The album cover design was by Tingling Design and Photos were by Kamal Studios. The first music video of the title song, "Jinday Ni Jinday" was shot in Vancouver and released a couple of weeks before the album release to promote the album. A new music video of the same song was released on 10 December 2009. It was shot in Delhi in historical sites such as Kutab Minar. It is the official music video.

== Reception ==
Overall, Jinday Ni Jinday has been extremely successful. It is considered one of Kamal Heer's greatest albums. A couple of Punjabi newspapers have liked and supported the album. The song "Ik Boli" was featured on BBC radios Asian Networks "The Playlist". Kamal Heer recently said in an interview that the album has gotten an amazing response and many people have liked it.

== Music videos ==
#	Title	Shot at	Date
1.	"Jinday Ni Jinday"	Vancouver, BC, Canada	5 November 2009
2.	"Ik Boli"	Nabha, Punjab, India	24 November 2009
3.	"Jinday Ni Jinday (New Video Shot at Kutab Minar)"	New Delhi, India	10 December 2009
4.	"Nashedi Dil"	Punjab, India	27 December 2009
5.	"Pendu Jatt"	Punjab, India	14 June 2010
6.	"Chetay Kareen"	TBA	TBA

== Awards ==
Jinday Ni Jinday has received three nominations from the 2010 Punjabi Music Awards

- Sandeep Sharma WON Best Music Video Director
- Sangtar was nominated for Best Non Resident Punjabi Music Director
- Kamal Heer WON Best Non Resident Punjabi Vocalist
