= Aqen =

Ancient Egyptian deity

Name in hieroglyphs
i V9 q n A40
- Consort: Imentet

The god Aqen (far right) with the rope of time emerging from his mouth, pulled by the gods of the hours (from the Eighth Hour of the Book of Gates, sarcophagus of Seti I)

Aqen was a rarely mentioned ancient Egyptian deity of the underworld. He is first mentioned in the famous Book of the Dead. There, he guided the sun god Ra as the "protector of Ra's celestial bark" by "bringing the shen-ring to his majesty". He was also described as the "mouth of the time", from which the gods and demons pulled the "rope of time", as described in the tomb of king Seti I.

== See also ==
- Kherty
- Charon
- Duat
