= Mastini =

Mastini can refer to:

- A.S. Mastini Varese Hockey, an Italian hockey team
- Neapolitan Mastiff, a breed of very large dogs

== See also ==
- Mastani
