= Plasma Records =

American record label

Plasma Records Entertainment Pvt. Ltd.
- Type: Private
- Industry: Music, Entertainment and Clothing
- Founded: Jalandhar, (2002)
- Founder: Deepak Bali; Manmohan Waris; Sangtar
- Headquarters: Jalandhar, India; Santa Monica, California, 28 Gujarat Complex, Joyti Chowk, Jalandhar, India, 144001
- Area served: Worldwide
- Key people: Manmohan Waris; Sangtar; Kamal Heer; Deepak Bali
- Products: Music Albums, Live Albums, Music DVDs, Shirts
- Divisions: Plasma Merchandise
- Website: PlasmaRecords.com

Plasma Records Entertainment Pvt . Ltd. (Plasma Records) is a global music label. It was formed in 2000 by Manmohan Waris, Kamal Heer and Sangtar.

== History ==
Plasma Records is the record label for Grind Music & Sound Inc., a digital audio and post-production facility. Grind Music & Sound was opened in 2001 by Sangtar and Michelle Garuik. In 2002 Plasma Records was formed and set up an operation center in Jalandhar, Punjab, India. Manmohan Waris said the reason for Plasma Records was "Many of the top guys in record companies themselves don't have the idea of the pulse of Punjabi music but we are expected to alter stuff and work according to their notions. Now we can do our own stuff without interference." The majority of music and associated materials released by Plasma Records is recorded fully or partially in the Grind Music & Sound studios. Plasma Records first release, Kamli by Kamal Heer, released in 2000. Since the formation of Plasma Records, Kamal Heer, Manmohan Waris and Sangtar released the majority of their music on Plasma Records. Plasma Records has also produced hits in recent years such as: Punjabi Virsa 2004-Wonderland Live, Nachiye Majajne, Punjabi Virsa 2005-London Live, Masti Three, Punjabi Virsa 2006-Toronto Live, Tasveer-Live, Chan Jiha Gabhru, Punjabi Reloaded, Kankaa, Punjabi Virsa Vancouver Live and Jinday Ni Jinday. Plasma Records has become a well known record company that releases hit albums. Plasma Records most recent releases are Jinday Ni Jinday by Kamal Heer and Dil Te Na Laeen by Manmohan Waris. Plasma Records also organizes the "Punjabi Virsa" tours every year with Kamal Heer, Manmohan Waris and Sangtar. Punjabi Virsa 2010 will be a tour of the UK, US and Canada from June–September 2010. Deepak Bali is the Plasma Records spokesperson and managing director.

== Clothing ==
Plasma Records also sells shirts. They feature designs with Kamal Heer, Manmohan Waris on them and more. They make clothing for men, women, and children. Along with the shirts Plasma Records also sell accessories such as bags, mousepads, buttons, satchels and more.

== Artists ==
- Kamal Heer
- Manmohan Waris
- Sangtar
- Gurpreet Ghuggi - Appearance in Shaunki Mela 2003
- Joginder Singh (Bhoutu Shah)
- Harvinder Singh (Kake Shah)
- Paul Sunner
- Resham Sooner

== Albums released By Plasma Records ==
Release date	Album	Artist(s)
January 2000	Kamli	Kamal Heer
2002	Dil Di Chori	Resham Sooner
December 2002	Masti-Kanthay Vala	Kamal Heer
March 2003	Ghar Hoon Kithni Ky Doore	Manmohan Waris
2003	Prem Lago Har Teer	Ashupreet Kaur
August 2003	Shaunki Mela 2003-Surrey Live	Kamal Heer, Sangtar, Gurpreet Ghuggi & Manmohan Waris
November 2003	Masti 2	Kamal Heer
January 2004	Bhotu Shah Ji Vihle Ne	Bhotu Shah and Kake Shah
February 2004	Nachiye Majajne	Manmohan Waris
October 2004	Punjabi Virsa 2004-Wonderland Live	Kamal Heer, Sangtar and Manmohan Waris
March 2005	Bhotu Shah Ji Fadde Gaye	Bhotu Shah and Kake Shah
November 2005	Punjabi Virsa 2005-London Live	Kamal Heer, Sangtar and Manmohan Waris
March 2006	Masti Three	Kamal Heer
April 2006	Tasveer	Manmohan Waris
December 2006	Punjabi Virsa 2006-Toronto Live	Kamal Heer, Sangtar and Manmohan Waris
January 2007	Kankaa	Aman Riar
September 2007	Dil Nachda	Manmohan Waris
December 2007	Chan Jiha Gabhru	Kamal Heer
June 2008	Moti Chun Ke	Kamal Heer
September 2008	Punjabi Reloaded	Kamal Heer and Manmohan Waris
September 2008	Laare Giniye	Manmohan Waris
December 2008	Surma	Resham Sooner
February 2009	Punjabi Virsa 2008 Vancouver Live	Kamal Heer, Sangtar and Manmohan Waris
November 2009	Jinday Ni Jinday	Kamal Heer
January 2010	Dil Te Na Laeen	
February 2012	Punjabi Virsa 2011 Melbourne Live	Manmohan Waris
