= Mast-Jägermeister =

German liquor company

Mast-Jägermeister SE
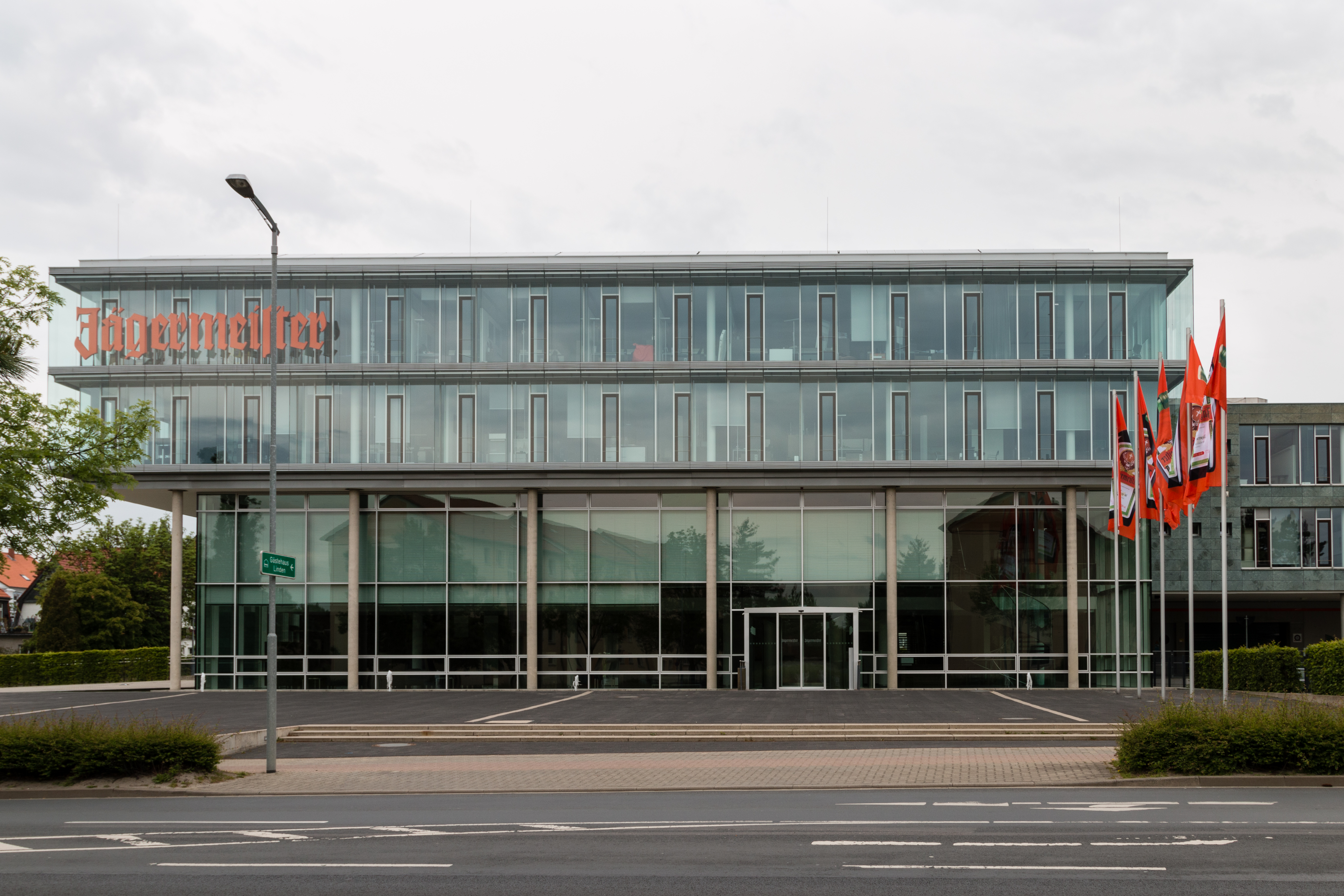
- Mast-Jägermeister headquarters in Wolfenbüttel
- Type: Family business
- Industry: Beverages
- Founded: 1878
- Headquarters: Wolfenbüttel, Lower Saxony, Germany
- Key people: Paolo Dell'Antonio (chairman of the board); Günter Mast (managing director); Jack Blecker
- Products: Kräuterliköre (Jägermeister und SchlehenFeuer)
- Revenue: €962 million (2023)
- Website: www.mast-jaegermeister.de

Mast-Jägermeister SE is a German liquor company owned by the Findel-Mast family. The corporate offices are located in Wolfenbüttel. Jägermeister is the primary product of Mast-Jägermeister SE. They also produce the lesser known SchlehenFeuer, a brand of sloe gin. In the past, they manufactured a multitude of liquors and liqueurs.

== History ==
Wilhelm Mast founded Mast-Jägermeister SE (then a KG) in Wolfenbüttel in 1878. His son Curt Mast developed the recipe for the herb flavored 70-proof (35%) liqueur Jägermeister, which he first brought to market in 1935. Günter Mast was the managing director for many years until his death in 2011.

== Production ==
Mast-Jägermeister SE produced 76.5 million 0.7 liter bottles in the financial year 2006 and grew by 15 percent in 2005. Most of the production (56.6 million) was exported to over 70 countries world-wide.

== COVID-19 ==
During the COVID-19 pandemic, the spirits manufacturer provided Braunschweig Hospital with 50,000 liters of alcohol for the production of disinfectants. According to the company, this donation was intended to contribute to the fight against the SARS-CoV-2 virus.
