= Masti Three =

Studio album by Kamal Heer
- Released: 25 February 2006
- Recorded: 2005–2006
- Genre: Punjabi, sad, folk, bhangra
- Length: 50:24
- Label: Plasma, Kiss
- Producer: Sangtar

Kamal Heer chronology
Masti 2 (2003)	Masti Three (2006)	Chan Jiha Gabhru (2007)

Masti Three is a Punjabi music album and the fourth studio album by Kamal Heer released in 2006 on Plasma Records. Music composition was by Sangtar and lyrics were by Mangal Hathur and S M Sadiq.

== Track listing ==
All music is composed by Sangtar.

Masti Three
No.	Title	Lyrics	Length
1.	"Gaaia Na Kar Ni"	Mangal Hathur	4:45
2.	"Akh Larh Gaee"	S M Sadiq	5:04
3.	"Dil Nu Tassali"	Mangal Hathur	4:32
4.	"Chan Meria"	Mangal Hathur	5:33
5.	"Banh Teri"	Mangal Hathur	5:17
6.	"Yaad Kar Kar Ke"	Mangal Hathur	4:57
7.	"Kamaad Beejia"	Mangal Hathur	4:27
8.	"Sutte Rehjange"	Mangal Hathur	3:46
9.	"Kaudi Kaudi"	Mangal Hathur	5:35
10.	"Turna Sikhide Han"	Mangal Hathur	6:28
Total length:			50:24

== Personnel ==
- Singer: Kamal Heer
- Music: Sangtar
- Lyrics: Mangal Hathur and S M Sadiq
- Recorded, Mixed and Mastered at: Grind Music and Sound Studios, Los Angeles
- Mixed and Mastered by: Michelle Garuik
- Back Vocals: Manmohan Waris and Sangtar
- Rhythm and Misc Overdubs by: Joy & Atul at Super Track Studios, Ludhiana and Hari Om at Deepika Studios, New Delhi
- Music Video Director: Sandeep Sharma
- Musicians: Danesh Kumar, Kuki, Sadiq, Sonu, Prashant Kumar, Rakesh, Tinka, Karishan Murari, Hari Om, Ghulam Ali, Rajinder Prasad and Sangtar

== Awards ==
Masti Three's title track "Gaaia Na Kar Ni" received Best Lyricist Award for Mangal Hathur at the 2007 ETC Punjabi Music Awards also known as The 4th Annual Punjabi Music Awards.
