= Phillipi House =

Historic house in Alabama, United States

- Phillipi Mastin House
- U.S. National Register of Historic Places
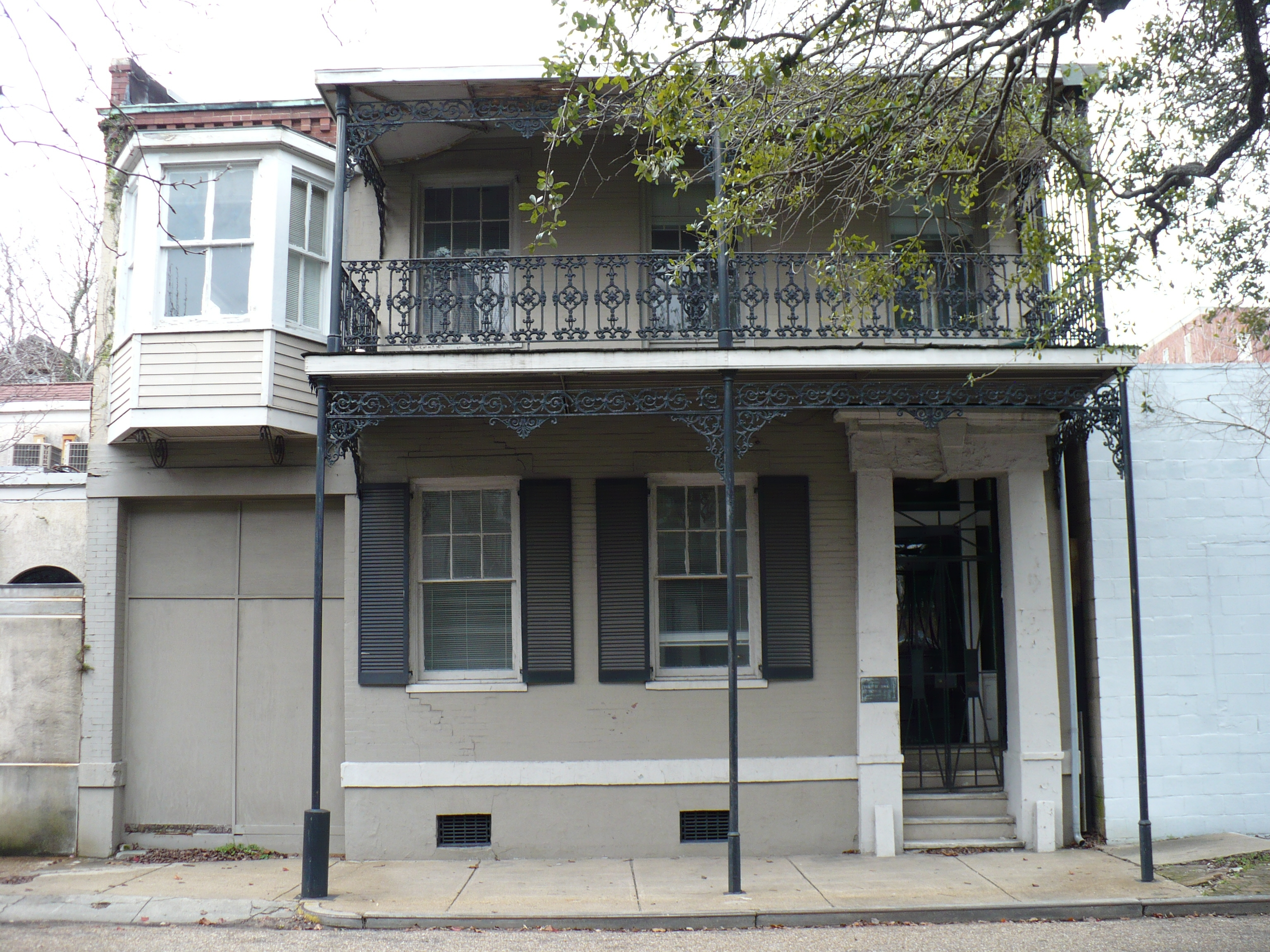

- Location within Mobile, Alabama Location within Alabama Location within the United States
- Location: 53 North Jackson Street; Mobile, Alabama
- Coordinates: 30°41′32″N 88°2′44″W
- Built: 1850
- NRHP reference No.: 84000689
- Added to NRHP: January 5, 1984

The Phillipi House, also known as the Mastin House, is a historic residence in Mobile, Alabama, United States. The two-story brick masonry structure was completed in 1850. It is built in a traditional Mobile townhouse style with a Greek Revival door surround and a second floor cast iron balcony across the front elevation. It was added to the National Register of Historic Places on January 5, 1984, based on its architectural significance.
