= Mastino =

Mastino may refer to:

- The rechristened name of the British boat Empire Becky

== Dogs ==
- Mastino Napoletano, one of the names for the Neapolitan Mastiff breed of dog
  - Software, is named after the dog
  - Mastinaro/Mastinari are breeders of the dogs

== Personas ==
- Bruiser Mastino, a wrestling persona performed by Mike Hallick and Glenn Jacobs
- Former member of the band Punkreas

== People ==
- Attilio Mastino (born 1949), rector for the University of Sassari
- F. Mastino, midfielder for FC Baulmes
- Mastino della Scala:
  - Mastino I della Scala (died 1277)
  - Mastino II della Scala (1308–1351)
