= Sangtar =

Indian singer

- Born: Sangtar Singh Heer; 9 October 1970 (age 55); Halluwal Punjab India
- Origin: Surrey, Canada
- Genres: Hindustani classical music, punjabi, bhangra, pop, folk
- Occupations: Singer, music composer, record producer, songwriter, audio editor, video editor, back vocalist and poet
- Instruments: Guitar, musical keyboard, harmonium, flute, mandolin, tumbi
- Years active: Poetry/Songwriting: 1987–present Composing & producing: 1993–present Singing: 2009
- Labels: Plasma Records (India); Kiss Records (UK)
- Website: www.sangtar.com

Sangtar Heer, more commonly known as just Sangtar, is a Punjabi singer, music composer, songwriter and poet. He has written songs and made music for many singers such as Kamal Heer, Manmohan Waris and Debi Makhsoospuri. His older brother Manmohan Waris and younger brother Kamal Heer are both Punjabi Pop\Folk singers.

== Birth ==
Sangtar Heer was born in a Heer jatt sikh family of village Halluwal to father Sardar Dilbag Singh.

== Discography ==
=== Compilations/Live ===
Shaunki Mela 2003-Surrey Live (Recorded Live at Millennium Park, Surrey, British Columbia, Canada on 21 June 2003. Along with Manmohan Waris, Gurpreet Ghuggi and Sangtar)

- Released: August, 2003
- Format: DVD and CD
- Label: Plasma Records
- Writer: Dhadi Amar Singh Shaunki, Shamsher Singh Sandhu, Charan Singh Safari, Kuldip Deep, Debi Makhsoospuri, Davinder Khannewala, Gurpreet Guggi, Jasbir Gunachauria, Mangal Hathur and Kamal Heer
- Producer: Sangtar
- Tracks: 29

Punjabi Virsa 2004-Wonderland Live (Recorded Live at Canada's Wonderland, Canada. Along with Manmohan Waris and Kamal Heer)

- Released: October, 2004
- Format: DVD and CD
- Label: Plasma Records, Kiss Records
- Writer: Dhadi Amar Singh Shaunki, Mangal Hathur, Davinder Khannewala, Debi Makhsoospuri, Malkiat Meet, Jasbir Gunachauria and Kuldip Deep
- Producer: Sangtar
- Tracks: 28

Punjabi Virsa 2005-London Live (Recorded Live at London. Along with Kamal Heer and Manmohan Waris)

- Released: November, 2005
- Format: DVD and CD
- Label: Plasma Records, Kiss Records
- Writer: Dhadi Amar Singh Shaunki, Mangal Hathur and Davinder Khannewala
- Producer: Sangtar
- Tracks: 26

Punjabi Virsa 2006-Toronto Live (Recorded Live at the Hershey Center, Mississauga on 24 July 2006. Along with Kamal Heer and Manmohan Waris)

- Released: December, 2006
- Format: DVD and CD
- Label: Plasma Records, Kiss Records
- Writer: Baba Bulleh Shah, Mangal Hathur, Davinder Khanewala, Sangtar and Jasbir Gunachauria
- Producer: Sangtar
- Tracks: 37

Punjabi Virsa Vancouver Live (Recorded Live at the Orpheum Theatre, Vancouver, British Columbia, Canada on 30 August 2008. Along with Kamal Heer and Manmohan Waris)

- Released: February, 2009
- Format: DVD and CD
- Label: Plasma Records, Planet Recordz
- Writer: Prof. Mohan Singh, Mushtak Alam Goga, Mangal Hathur, Charan Likhari, Jasbir Gunachauria, Debi Makhsoospuri and Sangtar
- Producer: Sangtar
- Tracks: 27

=== Albums composed ===
| Year | Album |
|---|---|
| 1993 | Gaairan Naal Peenghan Jhotdiye |
| 1994 | Hasdi De Phul Kirde |
| 1995 | Sohniay De Laare |
| 1996 | Sajjre Challe Muklave |
| 1997 | Gali Gali Vich Hokay |
| 1997 | Chardi Kala Panth Khalsa |
| 1998 | Akhian |
| 1998 | Mittaran Da Sah Rukhda |
| 1999 | Balle Ni Balle |
| 2000 | Kamli |
| 2000 | Laare Tere Nayi Mukkene |
| 2000 | Husn Da Jadu |
| 2001 | Dil Di Chori |
| 2001 | Gajray Gori De |
| 2002 | Masti-Kanthay Vala |
| 2003 | Dil Vatte Dil |
| 2003 | Ghar Hoon Kitni Ky Doore |
| 2003 | Shaunki Mela 2003-Surrey Live |
| 2003 | Masti 2 |
| 2004 | Bhotu Shah Ji Vihle Ne |
| 2004 | Nachiye Majajene |
| 2004 | Punjabi Virsa 2004-Wonderland Live |
| 2005 | Bhotu Shah Ji Fadde Gaye |
| 2005 | Punjabi Virsa 2005-London Live |
| 2005 | Duniya |
| 2006 | Masti Three |
| 2006 | Tasveer-Live |
| 2006 | Punjabi Virsa 2006-Toronto Live |
| 2007 | Chan Jiha Gabhru |
| 2007 | Dil Nachda |
| 2008 | Moti Chun Ke |
| 2008 | Laare Giniye |
| 2009 | Punjabi Virsa Vancouver Live |
| 2009 | Jinday Ni Jinday |
| 2010 | Dil Te Na Laeen |
| 2011 | Punjabi Virsa 2011 – Aus/NZ Live |
| 2025 | O Shera -Teer te Taj Kesari 2 Music Composer and Singer |

=== Songs written ===
- "Gidhe Vich Nachdi"
- "Lai Gaee Kalja"
- "Akhian De Vanaj"
- "Laare Laa Ke"
- "Do Jugtaan"
- "Rang Na Vata Laeen"
- "Thumke Te Thumka"
- "India Salaama Karda"
- "Hath Hath Mein"
- "Lakh Patla Jiha"
- "Gaune Da Ghar Doore"
- "Kar Hi Tamasha Dekhe"
- "Mar Gae Majajne"
- "Vasde Raho Pardesio"
- "Sare Hi Trucka Vale Ne"
- "Mul Morta"
- "Nashedi Dil"
- "Dhol Vajda Riha"
- "Dil Te Na Laeen"
- "Dhian Rukh Te Pani"
- "Load Chakna"

== Videography ==
| Release | DVD | Record label | Notes |
|---|---|---|---|
| August 2003 | Shounki Mela 2003-Surrey Live | Plasma Records | Live in Surrey Along with Manmohan Waris, Kamal Heer and Gurpreet Ghuggi |
| October 2004 | Punjabi Virsa 2004-Wonderland Live | Plasma Records/Kiss Records | Live in Canada's Wonderland Along with Kamal Heer and Manmohan Waris |
| November 2005 | Punjabi Virsa 2005 | Plasma Records/Kiss Records | Live in London Along with Kamal Heer and Manmohan Waris |
| 2006 | Punjabi Virsa Behind the Scenes | Plasma Records | Making Of Whole Punjabi Virsa Tour, Along with Manmohan Waris and Kamal Heer |
| December 2006 | Punjabi Virsa 2006-Toronto Live | Plasma Records/Kiss Records | Live in Toronto Along with Kamal Heer and Manmohan Waris |
| February 2009 | Punjabi Virsa Vancouver Live | Plasma Records/Kiss Records | Along with Kamal Heer and Manmohan Waris |

== Filmography ==
=== Producer ===
- Red Dog Diary: A Dogumentary (2010)

=== Cinematographer ===
- Red Dog Diary: A Dogumentary (2010) (Co-Cinematographer)

=== Sound department ===
- Tales from Beyond (2004) (Sound Effects Editor)
- Dirty Love (2005) (Sound Editor)
- I Tried (2007) (Sound Editor)

== Live performances ==
In August 2003 he appeared at Shaunki Mela 2003, a Special Tribute Concert for Dhadi Amar Singh Shaunki, with his two brothers.

The three brothers tour every year

- Punjabi Virsa 2004
- Punjabi Virsa 2005
- Punjabi Virsa 2006
- Punjabi Virsa 2007
- Punjabi Virsa 2008
- Punjabi Virsa 2009
- Punjabi Virsa 2010
- Punjabi Virsa 2011
- Punjabi Virsa 2012
- Punjabi Virsa 2014
- Punjabi Virsa 2014
- Punjabi Virsa 2015
- Punjabi Virsa 2016
- Punjabi Virsa 2017

== Awards and nominations ==
| Year | Category | For | Result |
|---|---|---|---|
| 2006 | Album of the Year | Punjabi Virsa 2006 | Won |
| 2009 | Best Non-Resident Punjabi Music Director | Laare Giniye | Nominated |
| 2010 | Best Non-Resident Punjabi Music Director | Jinday Ni Jinday | Nominated |
| 2010 | Best Duel Vocalists | Vasde Raho Pardesio (Along with Kamal Heer and Manmohan Waris | Nominated |
| 2010 | Best Non Resident Punjabi Vocalist | Punjabi Virsa Vancouver Live | Nominated |
| 2010 | Best Folk Oriented Album | Punjabi Virsa Vancouver Live | Won |
| 2010 | Best Non Resident Punjabi Album | Punjabi Virsa Vancouver Live | Nominated |
