= Punjabi Virsa 2010 =

2010 concert tour

- Tour by Kamal Heer, Manmohan Waris and Sangtar
- Location: United Kingdom; North America
- Start date: June 12, 2010
- End date: October 30, 2010
- No. of shows: 19

Kamal Heer, Manmohan Waris and Sangtar concert chronology
- Punjabi Virsa 2009 (2009); Punjabi Virsa 2010 (2010); Punjabi Virsa 2011 (2011)

Punjabi Virsa 2010 was a concert tour by Kamal Heer, Manmohan Waris and Sangtar. It is the seventh Punjabi Virsa tour. They will be touring cities in England and Scotland in June and July 2010 and Canada and United States in September and October 2010. The tour is presented by One World Productions and Plasma Records.

== Tour ==
Kamal Heer, Manmohan Waris and Sangtar arrived in the United Kingdom on June 6 and 7. They played their first and second concerts to sold out crowds at the New Bingley Hall, Birmingham and then Leeds Town Hall, Leeds. Then they played successful concerts in Sunderland and Glasgow with a sold out concert at Leicester. They completed the UK tour with a sold out concert at the Wembley Arena in London. The North American tour has begun with a concert in Calgary on September 11, 2010. The North American tour will have concerts in Canada before concerts in the United States.

== Concerts ==
Date	City	Country	Venue
Europe
June 12, 2010	Birmingham	England	New Bingley Hall
June 19, 2010	Leeds	England	Leeds Town Hall
June 23, 2010	Sunderland	England	Rainton Meadows
June 26, 2010	Leicester	England	Curve
June 28, 2010	Glasgow	Scotland	Glasgow City Halls
July 3, 2010	London	England	Wembley Arena
North America
September 11, 2010	Calgary	Canada	Southern Alberta Jubilee Auditorium
September 12, 2010	Winnipeg	Canada	Pantage Playhouse Theatre
September 18, 2010	Langley	Canada	Langley Events Centre
September 19, 2010	Oak Bay	Canada	Oak Bay High School
September 25, 2010	Brampton	Canada	Powerade Centre
September 26, 2010	Edmonton	Canada	Meridian Banquet & Conference Center
October 1, 2010	Indianapolis	United States	India Community Center
October 2, 2010	Burlington	United States	Burlington Township Performing Arts Center
October 3, 2010	Detroit	United States	Millennium Theater
October 9, 2010	Mason	United States	William Mason High School
October 10, 2010	New York City	United States	HBQVB Park
October 16, 2010	Dallas	United States	McFarlin Memorial Auditorium
October 30, 2010	Fresno	United States	Fresno Convention Center
