= Günter Mast =

German businessman

Günter Mast (July 4, 1927 in Braunschweig – February 28, 2011 in Lutterloh in the municipality of Unterlüß) was a German businessman. He was the chief executive officer of the family business Mast-Jägermeister, known as producer of the liquor Jägermeister.

During his tenure as CEO he secured the sponsorship of the Eintracht Braunschweig football team. Braunschweig's game against FC Schalke 04 on 24 March 1973 became the first-ever Bundesliga match to feature a club having sponsorship on its jersey, following a long dispute between Mast and the German Football Association, which had previously banned shirt-sponsors. Mast was also the president of the club from 1983 to 1986. However, personally Mast was not a football fan and later said to have attended only two matches of the club during his tenure as president.

He died on February 28, 2011.
