= MAST1 =

Protein-coding gene in the species Homo sapiens

Identifiers
- Aliases: MAST1, SAST, SAST170, microtubule associated serine/threonine kinase 1, MCCCHCM
- External IDs: OMIM: 612256; MGI: 1861901; GeneCards: MAST1
Available structures
PDB	Ortholog search: PDBe RCSB
PDB	List of PDB id codes 2M9X, 3PS4
Enzyme activity
EC #	BRENDA	ExPASy	KEGG	MetaCyc
2.7.11.1	↗	↗	↗	↗

Gene location (Human)
Chr.	Chromosome 19 (human)
Band	19p13.13	Start	12,833,951 bp
Band	19p13.13	End	12,874,952 bp

Gene location (Mouse)
Chr.	Chromosome 8 (mouse)
Band	8 C3|8 41.32 cM	Start	85,638,532 bp
Band	8 C3|8 41.32 cM	End	85,663,988 bp
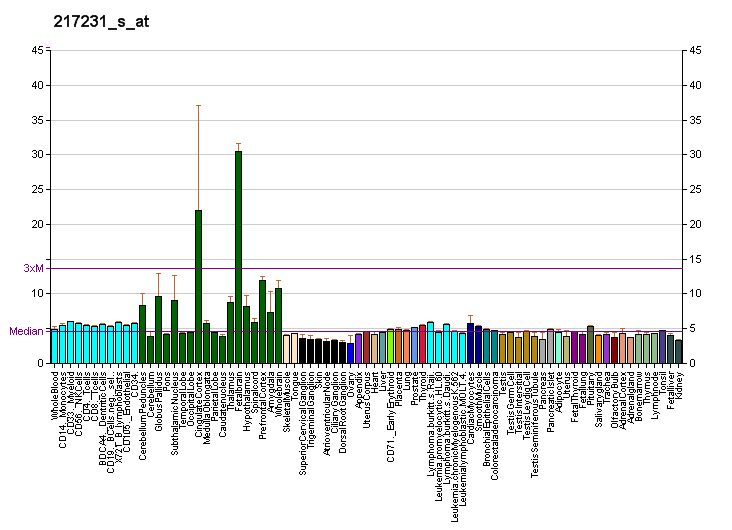
RNA expression pattern
Bgee	Human / Mouse (ortholog); Top expressed in: right hemisphere of cerebellum; right frontal lobe; ganglionic eminence; anterior cingulate cortex; Brodmann area 9; paraflocculus of cerebellum; prefrontal cortex; frontal pole; Brodmann area 10; anterior pituitary / Top expressed in: motor neuron; cerebellar cortex; central gray substance of midbrain; superior colliculus; pontine nuclei; ventromedial nucleus; primary visual cortex; dorsomedial hypothalamic nucleus; dorsal tegmental nucleus; cerebellar vermis; More reference expression data
BioGPS	More reference expression data
Gene ontology
Molecular function	transferase activity; nucleotide binding; protein kinase activity; protein serine/threonine kinase activity; protein binding; ATP binding; magnesium ion binding; metal ion binding; kinase activity
Cellular component	cytoplasm; plasma membrane; intracellular anatomical structure; cytoskeleton; membrane
Biological process	protein phosphorylation; intracellular signal transduction; cytoskeleton organization; peptidyl-serine phosphorylation; phosphorylation
Sources:Amigo / QuickGO
Orthologs
Databases	NCBI: entry; OMA: entry
Species	Human	Mouse
Entrez	22983	56527
Ensembl	ENSG00000105613	ENSMUSG00000053693
UniProt	Q9Y2H9	Q9R1L5
RefSeq (mRNA)	NM_014975	NM_019945
RefSeq (protein)	NP_055790	NP_064329
Location (UCSC)	Chr 19: 12.83 – 12.87 Mb	Chr 8: 85.64 – 85.66 Mb
PubMed search
- Wikidata
View/Edit Human	View/Edit Mouse

Microtubule-associated serine/threonine-protein kinase 1 is an enzyme that in humans is encoded by the MAST1 gene.
