= Emblem of the West =

Egyptian hieroglyph

R13 R14
"Symbol of the West"
in hieroglyphs

The Egyptian hieroglyph Emblem of the West (Gardiner no. R13 𓊿 or R14 𓋀) represents the goddess Imentet, personification of the afterlife. It is composed of a hawk or ostrich feather. The alternate version of the symbol contains the complete figure of the hawk, for Horus, with the feather extending sideways, making it similar to the iat standard, surmounted by individual gods. The feather is associated with the headdress worn by the Libyans.

The lower part of the hieroglyph contains the vertical form of the "folded cloth" (S29 𓋴) . As an ideogram, the hieroglyph represents imnt "west" or wnmy "right".

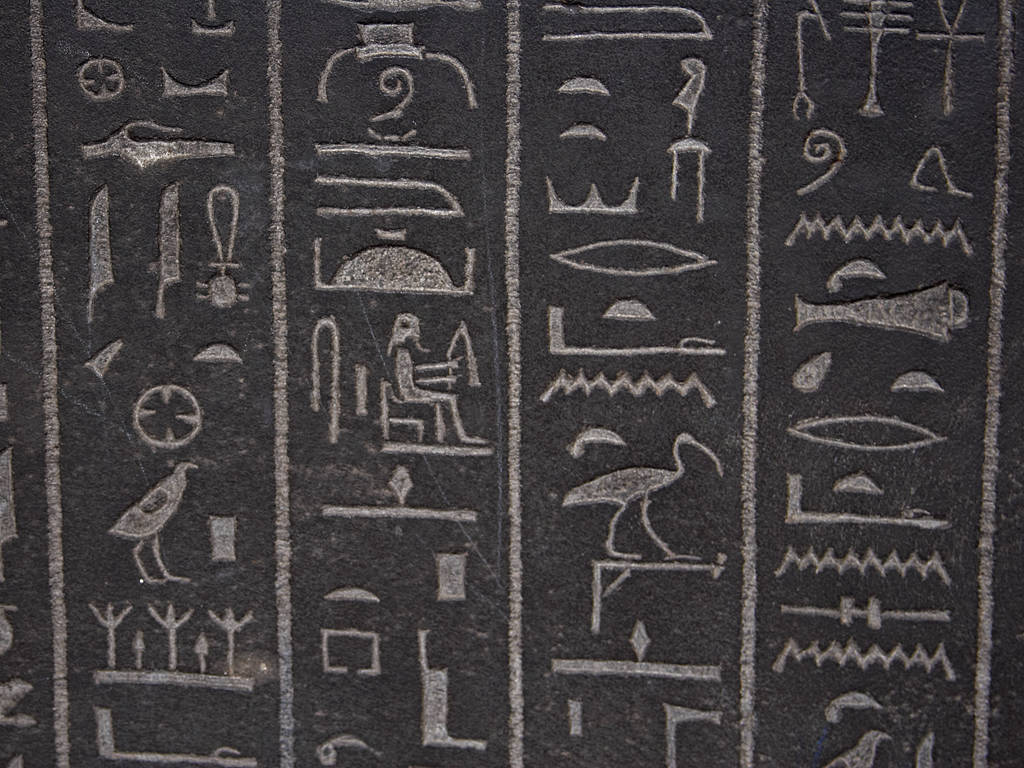
Hieroglyphs from Ankhnesneferibre's coffin; she was a Divine Adoratrice of Amun

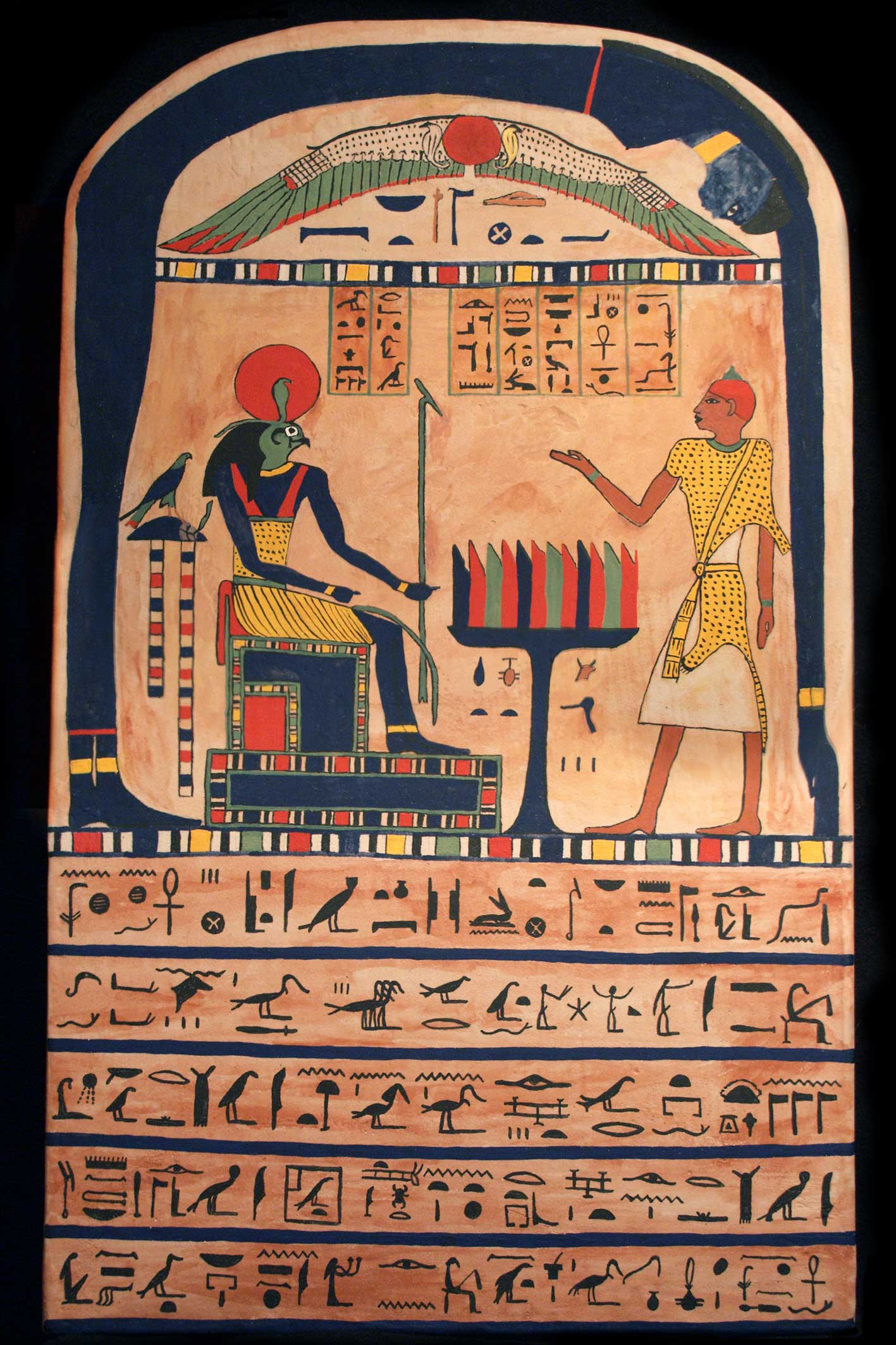
A stela.
5 registers of hieroglyphs read from upper right-to-left-(facing the hieroglyphs).

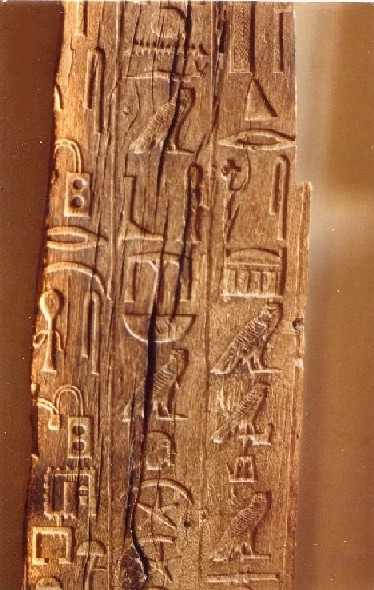
Archaic, variant style, 5th dynasty, 25th century BC

== See also ==
- Gardiner's Sign List#R. Temple Furniture and Sacred Emblems
- List of Egyptian hieroglyphs
- Emblem of the East
