= Slab stela =

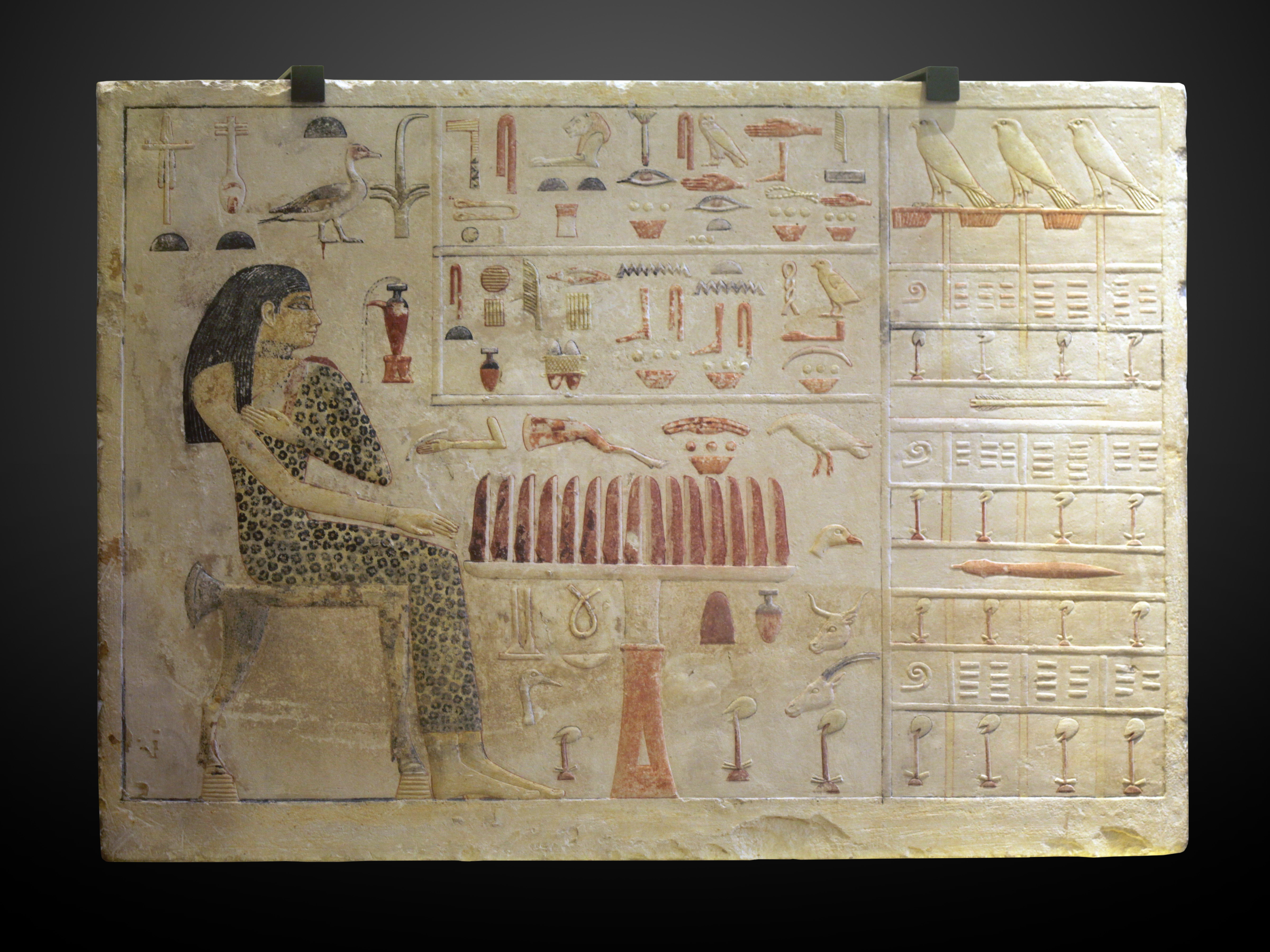
Slab stela of Nefertiabet, Louvre, Paris, E15591.

A slab stela is a horizontally oriented stela from ancient Egypt. Some of the earliest tablets from mid- to late-3rd millennium BC were painted slab stelas. A small number of Ancient Egyptian dignitaries or their wives had a slab stela.

Some funerary stelas were in the form of slab steles, as opposed to being of the more common vertical type.

From the middle 3rd millennium BC, some famous horizontal lintels were made. The noted architect Hemiunu had one. It is housed in the Roemer- und Pelizaeus-Museum of Germany. The horizontal lintel was used in other cultures in ancient times, for example in the Mesopotamian cultures.

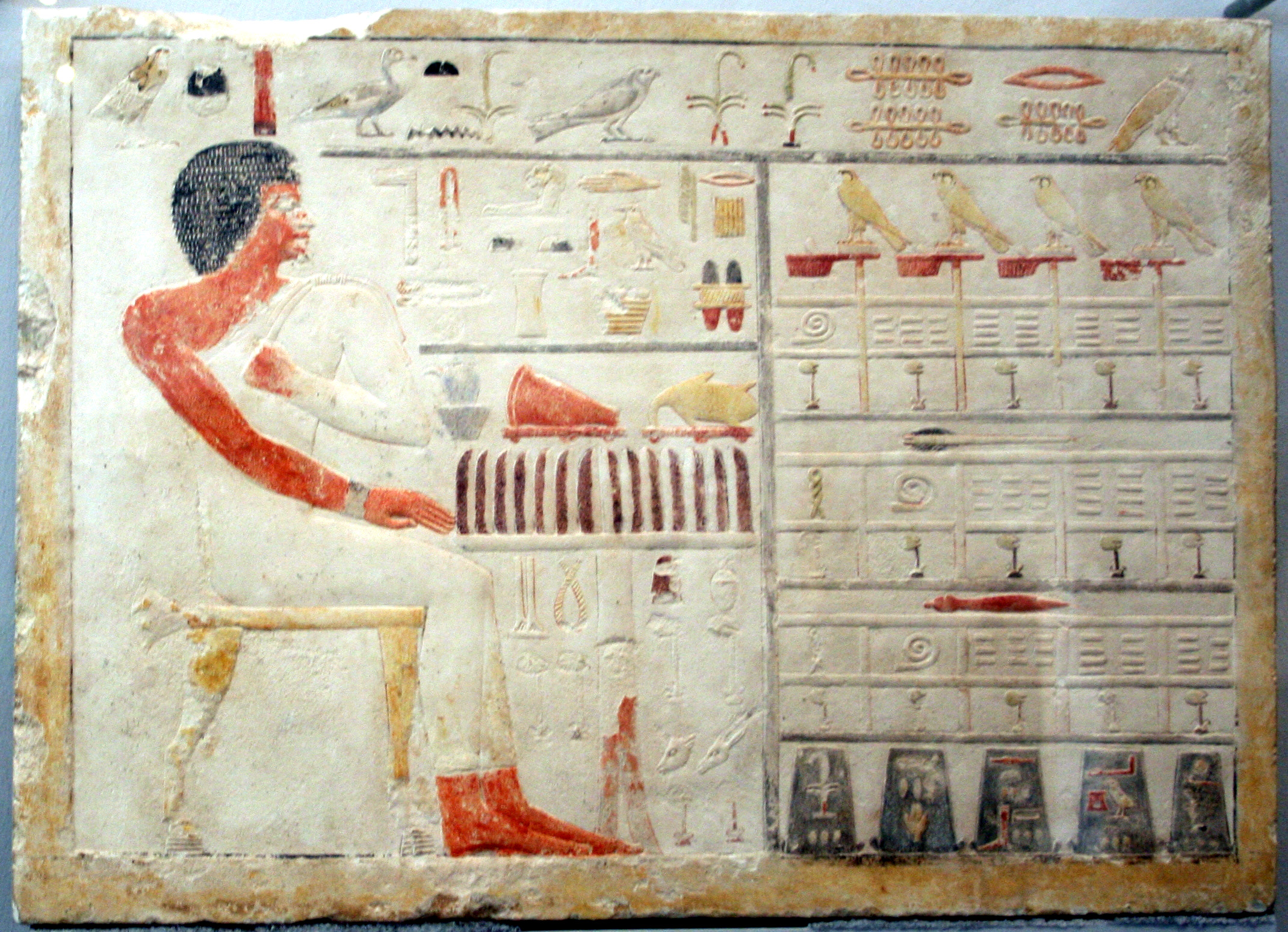
Iunu's slab stela, Roemer- und Pelizaeus-Museum, Hildesheim, PM4125

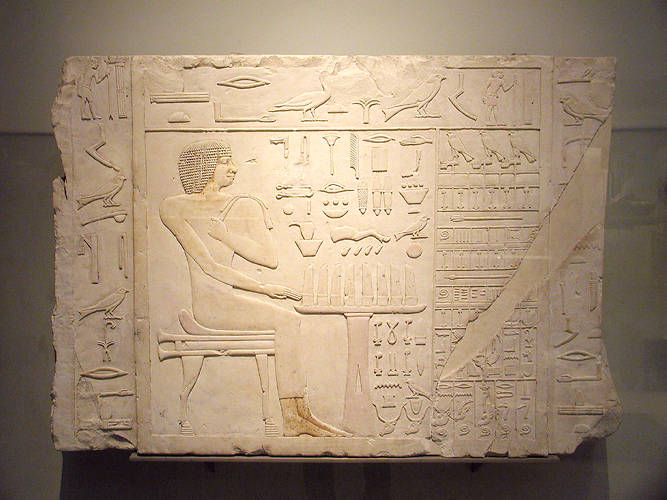
Prince Rahotep's slab stela, British Museum, London, EA1242

== See also ==
- Maya stelae
