= Kamal Heer =

Indian-born Canadian musician

- Born: Kamaljeet Singh Heer; 23 January 1973 (age 53); Halluwal, Punjab, India
- Origin: Surrey, British Columbia, Canada
- Genres: Punjabi, bhangra, pop, folk, classical
- Occupations: Singer and music composer
- Instruments: Chimta, harmonium and vocals
- Years active: Music director: 1993–2000; Singer: 2000–present
- Labels: Plasma Records (India); Moviebox (UK)
- Website: Official website

Kamal Heer (born Kamaljeet Singh Heer) is an Indian born Canadian musician. He is the younger brother of both Manmohan Waris and Sangtar, two other esteemed musicians. His live performances showcase his virtuosity with taan and his command of the art of traditional Punjabi music. All three Heer brothers are behind the formulation of Punjabi Virsa shows all over the world. These shows have become internationally famous. Also a talented composer, Kamal Heer has collaborated with his brother Sangtar to write music for their brother Waris.

== Career ==
Kamal Heer was born in a Jatt family within the village of Halluwal, Punjab, India. He learned music from Ustaad Jaswant Singh Bhanwra. After Kamal's family moved to Canada in 1990, he and his older brother Sangtar started composing music. In 1993 they composed music for Manmohan Waris's album, Gaairan Naal Penghan Jhotdiye, which became a huge hit. Heer continued composing until 1999.

Heer's debut album, Kamli, was released in 2000, which was mostly not a success. In 2002 he released Masti-Kanthay Vala, which became very successful especially "Kanthay Vala". He released Masti 2 in 2003 which contained the tracks "Nachne Nu Kare Mera Ji", "Kinnu Yaad Kar Kar Hasdi", "Hick Da Taveet" and "Ishq Ne Kamle Karte".

Heer continued his success with Punjabi Virsa 2004 - Toronto Live, a live album recorded in Toronto, Ontario, Canada with his two brothers. The success of this live album led to Punjabi Virsa concerts happening every year, when he toured with his brothers all around the world. Punjabi Virsa 2005, Punjabi Virsa 2006 and Punjabi Virsa 2008 were also recorded live. After the moderately successful studio albums Masti Three (2006) and Chan Jiha Gabhru (2007), Heer released Jinday Ni Jinday in 2009. This album is considered his most popular to date. After the Punjabi Virsa 2009 tour of Australia and New Zealand, there was Punjabi Virsa 2010.

Heer released the next live concert, Punjabi Virsa 2011 Melbourne, with Manmohan Waris and Sangtar. The show was widely appreciated. In 2012 he released two singles, "Club Wich" and "Google". In 2013 he released another live concert, Punjabi Virsa 2013, with Manmohan Waris and Sangtar. In February 2014, Heer put out the collaborative album Unity with Waris and Sangtar.

== Discography ==
=== Studio albums ===
Kamli

- Released: January 2000
- Format: Audio cassette, CD and digital download
- Label: Plasma Records, MagnaSound
- Writer: Malkiat Meet, Sangtar, Davinder Khannewala, Pappa Rajewalia, and Debi Makhsoospuri
- Producer: Sangtar
- Tracks: 8
- Singles: "Kamli", "Dila Meria"

Masti-Kanthay Vala

- Released: December 2002
- Format: Audio cassette, CD and digital download
- Label: Plasma Records, Music Waves
- Writer: Malkiat Meet, Davinder Khannewala, Debi Makhsoospuri and Sangtar
- Producer: Sangtar
- Director: Myth & Magic, Baljit Deol
- Tracks: 10
- Singles: "Kanthay Vala", "Bhajan Kure", "Yaad Aegi", "Dhann Dhann"

Masti 2

- Released: November 2003
- Format: CD, Audio cassette and digital download
- Label: Plasma Records, Kiss Records
- Writer: Mangal Hathur and Debi Makhsoospuri
- Producer: Sangtar
- Tracks: 10
- Singles: "Nachne Nu Kare Mera Jee", "Kinnu Yaad Kar Kar Hasdi", "Ishq Ne Kamle Karte"

Masti Three

- Released: February 2006
- Format: CD, Audio cassette and digital download
- Label: Plasma Records, Kiss Records
- Writer: Mangal Hathur and SM Sadiq
- Producer: Sangtar
- Director: Sandeep Sharma
- Tracks: 10
- Singles: "Gaaia Na Kar Ni", "Akh Larh Gaee", "Kamaad Beejia"

Chan Jiha Gabhru

- Released: December 2007
- Format: CD and digital download
- Label: Plasma Records, Kiss Records
- Writer: Mangal Hathur, Charan Likhari and Sangtar
- Producer: Sangtar
- Director: Sandeep Dhaliwal, Azeem Parker, Rimpy Prince and Sandeep Sharma
- Tracks: 8
- Singles: "Chan Jiha Gabhru", "Mar Gae Majajne", "Hathiar Na Chaliye", "Moti Chunke", "Majhay Diye Kudiye"

Jinday Ni Jinday

- Released: November 2009
- Format: CD and digital download
- Label: Plasma Records
- Writer: Jasbir Gunachauria, Sukhpal Aujla, Anil Fattegarh Jattan, Charan Likhari, Ninder Sher Khan, Preet Khetla and Sangtar
- Producer: Sangtar
- Director: Robert Holbrook, Sandeep Sharma and Bhupi Syan
- Tracks: 8
- Singles: "Jinday Ni Jinday", "Ik Boli", "Nashedi Dil", "Chete Kareen"

=== Collaborations ===
Unity (With Manmohan Waris and Sangtar)

- Released: 27 February 2014
- Format: CD, digital
- Label: Plasma Records, MovieBox
- Writer: Kamal Heer, Sangtar, Davinder Khannewala
- Producer: Sangtar
- Tracks: 11
- Singles: "Dil Di Rani", "Chann Di Chadini", "Dila Meria", "Gal Ban Gaee" (Photo Viah Wali)"

=== Live albums ===
Shaunki Mela 2003-Surrey Live (Recorded live at Millenium Park, Surrey, Canada on 21 June 2003. With Manmohan Waris, Gurpreet Ghuggi and Sangtar.)

- Released: August 2003
- Format: DVD, VHS, CD and Audio cassette
- Label: Plasma Records
- Writer: Dhadi Amar Singh Shaunki, Shamsher Singh Sandhu, Charan Singh Safari, Kuldip Deep, Debi Makhsoospuri, Davinder Khannewala, Gurpreet Guggi, Jasbir Gunachauria, Mangal Hathur and Sangtar
- Producer: Sangtar
- Tracks: 29

Punjabi Virsa 2004-Wonderland Live (Recorded live at Canada's Wonderland, Canada. With Manmohan Waris and Sangtar.)

- Released: October 2004
- Format: DVD and CD
- Label: Plasma Records, Kiss Records
- Writer: Dhadi Amar Singh Shaunki, Mangal Hathur, Davinder Khannewala, Debi Makhsoospuri, Malkiat Meet, Jasbir Gunachauria and Kuldip Deep
- Producer: Sangtar
- Tracks: 28

Punjabi Virsa 2005-London Live (Recorded live at London, England. With Manmohan Waris and Sangtar.)

- Released: November 2005
- Format: DVD and CD
- Label: Plasma Records, Kiss Records
- Writer: Dhadi Amar Singh Shaunki, Mangal Hathur, Davinder Khannewala and Sangtar
- Producer: Sangtar
- Tracks: 26

Punjabi Virsa 2006-Toronto Live (Recorded live at the Hershey Center, Mississauga, Ontario, Canada. With Manmohan Waris and Sangtar.)

- Released: December 2006
- Format: DVD and CD
- Label: Plasma Records, Kiss Records
- Writer: Baba Bulleh Shah, Mangal Hathur, Davinder Khanewala, Sangtar and Jasbir Gunachauria
- Producer: Sangtar
- Tracks: 37

Punjabi Virsa 2008 Vancouver Live (Recorded live at Orpheum Theater, Vancouver, British Columbia, Canada on 30 August 2008. With Manmohan Waris and Sangtar.)

- Released: February 2009
- Format: DVD and CD
- Label: Plasma Records, Planet Recordz
- Writer: Prof. Mohan Singh, Debi Makhsoospuri, Mushtak Alam Goga, Jasbir Gunachauria, Charan Likhari, Mangal Hathur and Sangtar
- Producer: Sangtar
- Tracks: 27

Punjabi Virsa 2011 (Recorded live in Melbourne, Australia. With Manmohan Waris and Sangtar.)

- Released: 2011
- Format: DVD and CD
- Label: Plasma Records, MovieBOX
- Producer: Sangtar
- Tracks: 45

Punjabi Virsa 2013 (Recorded live in Sydney, Australia. With Manmohan Waris and Sangtar.)

- Released: 2013
- Format: DVD and CD
- Label: Plasma Records, MovieBOX
- Producer: Sangtar
- Tracks: 43

Punjabi Virsa 2014 (Recorded live in Abbottsford, Canada. With Manmohan Waris and Sangtar.)

- Released: 2014
- Format: DVD and CD
- Label: Plasma Records, MovieBOX
- Producer: Sangtar
- Tracks: 39

Punjabi Virsa 2015 (Recorded live in Auckland, New Zealand. With Manmohan Waris and Sangtar.)

- Released: 2015
- Format: DVD and CD
- Label: Plasma Records, MovieBOX
- Producer: Sangtar
- Tracks: 22

Punjabi Virsa 2016 (Recorded live in Powerade. With Manmohan Waris and Sangtar.)

- Released: 13 April 2017
- Format: DVD and CD
- Label: Plasma Records
- Producer: Sangtar
- Tracks: 18

Punjabi Virsa 2017 (Recorded live in Melbourne, Australia. With Manmohan Waris and Sangtar.)

- Released: 2018
- Format: DVD and CD
- Label: Plasma Records
- Producer: Sangtar

=== Compilations ===
Masti Hits

- Released: August 2006
- Format: DVD and CD
- Label: Plasma Records
- Writer: Mangal Hathur, Malkiat Meet and Davinder Khannewala
- Producer: Sangtar
- Tracks: 10

Moti Chun Ke (Sad Song Collection)

- Released: July 2008
- Format: CD
- Label: Plasma Records
- Writer: Mangal Hathur, Debi Makhsoospuri, Davinder Khannewala, Malkiat Meet and Charan Likhari
- Producer: Sangtar
- Tracks: 10

Punjabi Reloaded (With Manmohan Waris)

- Released: September 2008
- Format: CD
- Label: Plasma Records, Kiss Records
- Writer: Mangal Hathur and Davinder Khannewala
- Producer: Joy & Atul
- Tracks: 12

=== Music videos ===
Year	Song	Album
2000	Kamli	Kamli
2000	Dila Meria	Kamli
2002	Bhajjan Kurray	Masti-Kanthav Vala
2002	Kanthey Vala	Masti-Kanthav Vala
2002	Yaad Aegi	Masti-Kanthav Vala
2002	Dhann Dhann	Masti-Kanthav Vala
2003	Nachne Nu Kare Mera Ji	Masti 2
2003	Kinnu Yaad Kar Kar Hassidi	Masti 2
2003	Ishq Ne Kamle Karthe	Masti 2
2006	Gaaia Na Karne	Masti Three
2006	Akh Lar Gaee	Masti Three
2006	Kaamad Bejeya	Masti Three
2007	Chan Jiha Gabhru	Chan Jiha Gabhru
2007	Mar Gae Majajne	Chan Jiha Gabhru
2007	Roz Ladna	Chan Jiha Gabhru
2007	Hathiar Na Chalaiye	Chan Jiha Gabhru
2007	Sharab Chon Disen	Chan Jiha Gabhru
2007	Moti Chunke	Chan Jiha Gabhru
2007	Majhay Diye Kudiye	Chan Jiha Gabhru
2008	Huss Ho Gia	Punjabi Reloaded
2008	Chajju Da Chubara	Punjabi Reloaded
2008	Ik Gerha	Punjabi Reloaded
2009	Jinday Ni Jinday (Vancouver)	Jinday Ni Jinday
2009	Ik Boli	Jinday Ni Jinday
2009	Jinday Ni Jinday(New Delhi)	Jinday Ni Jinday
2009	Nashedi Dil	Jinday Ni Jinday
2010	Pendu Jatt	Jinday Ni Jinday
TBA	Chetey Kareen	Jinday Ni Jinday

=== Non-album singles ===
Year	Song	Record label	Music	Lyrics
2010	"Facebook"	Plasma Records, MovieBox	Sangtar	Sukhpal Aujla
2012	"Google Te" (feat. Sangtar)	Plasma Records, MovieBox	Sangtar	Sukhpal Aujla
2013	"Ik Bulla"	Plasma Records, MovieBox	Sangtar	Davinder Khannewala
2013	"Tuttda Gia"	Plasma Records, MovieBox	Sangtar	Sukhpal Aujla
2015	Desi Disc	Plasma Records, MovieBox	Beat Minister	Mushtak Alam Goga
2015	"Tera Hero"	Plasma Records, MovieBox	Beat Minister	Kundha Singh Dhaliwal
2018	Ticketan	Plasma Records, MovieBox	Sangtar	Mangal Hathur

==== Collaborative singles ====
Year	Song	Record label	Music	Lyrics
2011	"Beja Sadi Cab 'ch" (with Manmohan Waris)	Plasma Records, MovieBox	Sangtar	Sukhpal Aujla
2012	"Baba Bore Ho Gia" (with Manmohan Waris and Sangtar)	Plasma Records, MovieBox	Sangtar	Sukhpal Aujla
2012	"Club Wich" (with DNA)	Plasma Records, MovieBox	DNA	Preet Sanghreri
2013	"Raavi Te Jhanan Diyan Chhalla" (with Manmohan Waris)	T-Series	Sangtar	Dr. Surjit Pattar
2013	"Dukh Sukh" (with Manmohan Waris)	Plasma Records, MovieBox	Sangtar	Kundha Singh Dhaliwal

== Videography ==
Release	DVD	Record label	Notes
August 2003	Shaunki Mela 2003-Surrey Live	Plasma Records	Recorded live in Surrey. Special tribute concert to Dhadi Amar Singh Shaunki. With Manmohan Waris, Gurpreet Ghuggi and Sangtar.
July 2004	Plasma Framed Vol. 1	Plasma Records	Videos, with Manmohan Waris
October 2004	Punjabi Virsa 2004-Wonderland Live	Plasma Records/Kiss Records	Recorded live in Toronto with Manmohan Waris and Sangtar
November 2005	Punjabi Virsa 2005-London Live	Plasma Records/Kiss Records	Recorded live in London with Manmohan Waris and Sangtar
2006	Punjabi Virsa Behind The Scenes	Plasma Records	Making of the whole Punjabi Virsa tour, with Manmohan Waris and Sangtar
December 2006	Punjabi Virsa 2006-Toronto Live	Plasma Records/Kiss RecordS	Recorded live in Toronto with Manmohan Waris and Sangtar
February 2009	Punjabi Virsa 2008 Vancouver Live	Plasma Records	Recorded live in Vancouver with Manmohan Waris and Sangtar

== Live performances ==
=== Concerts and tours ===
In August 2003 he appeared at Shaunki Mela 2003, a Special Tribute Concert for Dhadi Amar Singh Shaunki, with his two brothers and Gurpreet Ghuggi.

The three brothers tour every year

- Punjabi Virsa 2004
- Punjabi Virsa 2005
- Punjabi Virsa 2006
- Punjabi Virsa 2007
- Punjabi Virsa 2008
- Punjabi Virsa 2009
- Punjabi Virsa 2010
- Punjabi Virsa 2011
- Punjabi Virsa 2012
- Punjabi Virsa 2014
- Punjabi Virsa 2014
- Punjabi Virsa 2015
- Punjabi Virsa 2016
- Punjabi Virsa 2017

=== Other ===
Date	Performance	Notes
2008	Parbat Ali Vijay Diwas	Special concert for the Indian Armed Forces, with Manmohan Waris
21 March 2009	2009 Punjabi Music Awards	Performed during the awards

== Awards and nominations ==
Year	Category	For	Result
2006	Album of the Year	Punjabi Virsa 2006	Won
2009	Best Folk Pop Vocalist	Hathiyar Na Chalaiye	Lost
2009	Best Folk Pop Album	Moti Chun Ke	Lost
2010	Best Non Resident Punjabi Vocalist	Jinday Ni Jinday	Won
2010	Best Non Resident Punjabi Vocalist	Punjabi Virsa Vancouver Live	Lost
2010	Best Folk Oriented Album	Punjabi Virsa Vancouver Live	Won
2010	Best Dual Vocalists	Vasde Raho Pardesio (with Manmohan Waris and Sangtar)	Lost
2010	Best Non Resident Punjabi Album	Punjabi Virsa Vancouver Live	Lost
