= Manmohan Waris =

Indian Punjabi folk/pop singer (born 1967)

- Born: Manmohan Singh Heer; 3 August 1967 (age 59); Halluwal, India
- Origin: Punjab, India
- Genres: Punjabi, Pop, Sad, Bhangra and Folk
- Occupations: Singer
- Instruments: Vocals and Tumbi
- Years active: 1993–present
- Label: Plasma Records
- Website: manmohanwaris.com

Manmohan Singh Heer (Manmohan Waris; born 3 August 1967) is a Punjabi folk/pop singer. He is the elder brother of record producer Sangtar and singer Kamal Heer. Waris is considered one of the Most gifted singers of Punjabi folk music.

== Birth ==
Manmohan Waris was born in a Heer Jatt Sikh family to father Sardar Dilbag Singh Heer in village Halluwal in district Hoshiarpur, Punjab India.

== Career ==
Manmohan Waris was born in Halluwal, Punjab, India, the eldest son of Dilbag Singh. He started training in music aged 11, passing on what he learnt to his younger brothers. He moved to Canada in 1990, with Waris releasing his first album Gairan Naal Peenghan Jhootdeye in 1993.

He signed with Tips Music and released the album Husn Da Jadu with them in 2000, before starting his own record label, Plasma Records with his brothers, Kamal Heer and Sangtar. He has released the majority of his music on this label.

In 2004 Waris released Nachiye Majajne, the same year touring in the Punjabi Virsa 2004 tour. Following his studio album Dil Nachda in 2007, Waris's latest album, Dil Te Na Laeen was released in 2010. He then toured around the world with Punjabi Virsa 2010.

Waris is married to Pritpal Kaur Heer and they have two children. In the year 1998, Manmohan Waris's song "Kite kalli beh ke sochin nhee" came out with lyrics written by Jasbir Gunachauria. This song created a wave in Punjabi Music. This song gained international popularity. The posters of this song were hanging everywhere in Punjab including every car, truck and bus at that time. Manmohan Waris became a very big star with this song.

== Discography ==
Gaairan Naal Penghan Jhotdiye

- Released: 1993
- Writer: Dhadi Amar Singh Shaunki, Debi Makhsoospuri and Sangtar
- Producer: Kamal Heer and Sangtar
- Tracks: 8
- Singles: Do Tara Vajda Ve

Sohniya De Laare

- Released: 1994
- Producer: Kamal Heer and Sangtar
- Tracks: 8

Hasdi De Phul Kirde

- Released: 1995
- Writer: Debi Makhsoospuri, Davinder Khannewala, Kamal Heer and Sangtar
- Producer: Kamal Heer and Sangtar
- Tracks: 8

Sajjre Challe Muklave

- Released: 1996
- Producer: Kamal Heer and Sangtar
- Tracks: 8

Gali Gali Vich Hookay

- Released: 1997
- Writer: Debi Makhsoospuri, Davinder Khannewala and Jasbir Gunachauria
- Producer: Kamal Heer and Sangtar
- Tracks: 8

Mitran Da Sah Rukhda

- Released: 1998
- Producer: Kamal Heer and Sangtar
- Tracks: 8

Mitran Ne Bhangra Pauna

- Released: 1998
- Producer: Kamal Heer and Sangtar
- Tracks: 10
- Singles: Mittran Ne Bhangra Pauna and Kitte Kalli Beh Ke Sochi Ni

Husn Da Jadu

- Released: 2000
- Writer: Dhadi Amar Singh Shaunki, Debi Makhsoospuri, Malkiat Meet, Davinder Khannewala and Sangtar
- Producer: Sangtar
- Tracks: 10

Gajray Gori De

- Released: 2001
- Producer: Sangtar
- Tracks: 9

Dil Vatte Dil

- Released: 2003
- Writer: Mangal Hathur
- Producer: Sangtar
- Tracks: 8

Nachiye Majajne

- Released: 2004
- Writer: Mangal Hathur and Debi Makhsoospuri
- Producer: Sangtar
- Tracks: 10

Dil Nachda

- Released: 2007
- Writer: Mangal Hathur and Davinder Khannewala
- Producer: Sangtar
- Tracks: 10

Dil Te Na Laeen

- Released: 16 January 2010
- Writer: Jasbir Gunachauria, Charan Likhari, Sukhpal Aujla, Preet Khetla and Sangtar
- Producer: Sangtar
- Director: Sandeep Sharma,
- Tracks: 8

Castle Bromwich

- Released: 21 January 2013
- Writer: Sangtar, Satti Khokhewalia, Jinder Bhandal, Jelly Manjitpuri, Geeta Zaildar & Kundha S. Dhaliwal
- Producer: Sangtar
- Director: Sandeep Sharma, Sai (Ballistic) & R.Swami
- Tracks: 11
- Singles: Tera Ishq

=== Compilations ===
Mega Waris

- Released: January 1996
- Writer: Debi Makhsoospuri and Davinder Khannewala
- Producer: Kamal Heer and Sangtar
- Tracks: 8

Thunder-Mix Monster Remixes

- Released: 1996
- Writer: Dhadi Amar Singh Shaunki, Sangtar, Jasbir Gunachauria and Debi Makhsoospuri
- Producer: Kamal Heer and Sangtar
- Tracks: 8

The Dance Master

- Released: 1998
- Writer: Davinder Khannewala and Debi Makhsoospuri
- Producer: Kamal Heer and Sangtar
- Tracks: 8

Manmohan Waris De Dard Bhare Geet

- Released: 2002
- Writer: Jasbir Gunachauria, Debi Makhsoospuri and Kamal Heer
- Producer: Kamal Heer and Sangtar
- Tracks: 8

Shaunki Mela 2003 (Recorded Live at Millennium Park, Surrey, Canada on 21 June 2003. Along with Kamal Heer, Gurpreet Ghuggi and Sangtar)

- Released: August 2003
- Writer: Dhadi Amar Singh Shaunki, Shamsher Singh Sandhu, Charan Singh Safari, Kuldip Deep, Debi Makhsoospuri, Davinder Khannewala, Gurpreet Guggi, Jasbir Gunachauria, Mangal Hathur and Sangtar
- Producer: Sangtar
- Tracks: 29

Punjabi Virsa 2004-Wonderland Live (Recorded Live at Canada's Wonderland, Canada. Along with Kamal Heer and Sangtar)

- Released: October 2004
- Writer: Dhadi Amar Singh Shaunki, Mangal Hathur, Davinder Khannewala, Debi Makhsoospuri, Malkiat Meet, Jasbir Gunachauria and Kuldip Deep
- Producer: Sangtar
- Tracks: 28

The Greatest Hits of Manmohan Waris

- Released: January 2005
- Writer: Dhadi Amar Singh Shaunki, Debi Makhsoospuri, Jasbir Gunachauria, Davinder Khannewala and Sangtar
- Producer: Kamal Heer, Sangtar
- Tracks: 11

Punjabi Virsa 2005-London Live (Recorded live at London, England. Along with Kamal Heer and Sangtar)

- Released: November 2005
- Writer: Dhadi Amar Singh Shaunki, Mangal Hathur and Davinder Khannewala
- Producer: Sangtar
- Tracks: 26

Punjabi Virsa 2006-Toronto Live (Recorded Live at the Hershey Center, Mississauga, Canada. Along with Kamal Heer and Sangtar.)

- Released: December 2006
- Writer: Baba Bulleh Shah, Mangal Hathur, Davinder Khanewala, Sangtar and Jasbir Gunachauria
- Producer: Sangtar
- Tracks: 37

Laare Giniye (Sad Song Collection)

- Released: September 2008
- Writer: Mangal Hathur and Debi Makhsoospuri
- Producer: Sangtar
- Tracks: 8

Punjabi Reloaded (Along with Kamal Heer.)

- Released: September 2008
- Writer: Mangal Hathur and Davinder Khannewala
- Producer: Joy & Atul
- Tracks: 12

Punjabi Virsa Vancouver Live (Recorded Live at Orpheum Theater, Vancouver, Canada on 30 August 2008. Along with Kamal Heer and Sangtar)

- Released: February 2009
- Writer: Prof. Mohan Singh, Debi Makhsoospuri, Mushtak Alam Goga, Jasbir Gunachauria, Charan Likhari, Mangal Hathur and Sangtar
- Producer: Sangtar
- Tracks: 27

Manmohan Waris-Forever

- Released: December 2009
- Writer: Debi Makhsoospuri, Davinder Khannewala, Jasbir Gunachauria, Kamal Heer and Sangtar
- Producer: Kamal Heer and Sangtar
- Tracks: 31

=== Religious albums ===
Ardaas Karaan

- Released: February 2011
- Tracks: 11

Chardi Kala Ch Panth Khalsa

- Released: April 1997
- Writer: Debi Makhsoospuri
- Producer: Sangtar
- Tracks: 8

Ghar Hoon Kitni Ky Doore

- Released: March 2003
- Writer: Dhadi Amar Singh Shaunki and Mangal Hathur
- Producer: Sangtar
- Tracks: 8

Tasveer-Live (Recorded Live at Raja Sahib, Jingra, Shahed Bhagat Singh Nagar, Punjab on 14 March 2006)

- Released: April 2006
- Writer: Mangal Hathur
- Producer: Sangtar
- Tracks: 9

Chalo Patna Sahib Nu (Recorded in Punjab on 350th Birthday Celebration of Sri Guru Gobind Singh Ji)

- Released: 30 December 2016
- Writer: Veer Rahimpuri
- Producer: Plasma Records
- Singles: 1

== Videography ==
Release	DVD	Record label	Notes
January 2002	Best of Manmohan Waris	T-Series	Music Videos of the best songs by Manmohan Waris
August 2003	Shounki Mela 2003	Plasma Records	Recorded Live in Surrey. Special Tribute Concert to Dhadi Amar Singh Shaunki .Along with Kamal Heer, Sangtar and Gurpreet Ghuggi
July 2004	Plasma Framed Vol. 1	Plasma Records	Videos Along with Kamal Heer
October 2004	Punjabi Virsa 2004	Plasma Records/Kiss Records	Recorded Live In Toronto Along with Kamal Heer and Sangtar
November 2005	Punjabi Virsa 2005-London Live	Plasma Records/Kiss Records	Recorded Live In London Along with Kamal Heer and Sangtar
2006	Tasveer-Live	Plasma Records/kiss records	Recorded Live in Raja Sahib, Jingra, Shahed Bhagat Singh Nagar
2006	Punjabi Virsa Behind The Scenes	Plasma Records	Making of Whole Punjabi Virsa Tour, Along with Kamal Heer and Sangtar
December 2006	Punjabi Virsa 2006	Plasma Records/Kiss Records	Recorded Live In Toronto Along with Kamal Heer and Sangtar
February 2009	Punjabi Virsa Vancouver Live	Plasma Records	Recorded Live in Vancouver Along with Kamal Heer and Sangtar

=== Guest appearances ===
Year	Song	Label	Notes
2002	Rang De Basanti Chola	Tips	Along With Sonu Nigam from Bollywood Movie, Legend of Bhagat Singh
December 2002	Lok Boliyan	Venus	Along with Jazzy B with Parmjeet Parmaar, from Get Back Jazzy B
2012	"The Folk King" (Tribute To Kuldip Manak)	MovieBox Record	Music By Aman Hayer Along with A.S. Kang, Jazzy B, Sukshinder Shinda, Malkit Singh, Manmohan Waris Balwinder Safri & Angrej Ali
2015	Parne Nu	Saga Hits	Music By Jatinder Singh-Shah From Faraar By Gippy Grewal

=== Unofficial ===
- Mahiya (Unofficial studio album, released in 1992)
- Kalli Beh Ke Sochi Ni (Remix) (Single)

== Live performances ==
=== Concerts and tours ===
In August 2003 he appeared at Shaunki Mela 2003, a Special Tribute Concert for Dhadi Amar Singh Shaunki, with his two brothers.

The three brothers tour every year

- Punjabi Virsa 2004
- Punjabi Virsa 2005
- Punjabi Virsa 2006
- Punjabi Virsa 2007
- Punjabi Virsa 2008
- Punjabi Virsa 2009
- Punjabi Virsa 2010
- Punjabi Virsa 2011
- Punjabi Virsa 2012
- Punjabi Virsa 2013
- Punjabi Virsa 2014
- Punjabi Virsa 2015
- Punjabi Virsa 2016
- Punjabi Virsa 2017
- Punjabi Virsa 2018
- Punjabi Virsa 2019
- Punjabi Virsa 2020
- Punjabi Virsa 2021
- Punjabi Virsa 2022
- Punjabi Virsa 2023

He also performed "parbat Ali Vijay Diwas at a Special Concert for the Indian Armed Forces with Kamal Heer in 2008, and sang at the 2009 Punjabi Music Awards.

== Awards ==
He was awarded Best Playback Singer at the PTC Punjabi film awards in 2016 for his rendition of "Parne Nu" from the film Faraar.
