= Guidances for statistics in regulatory affairs =

Guidances for statistics in regulatory affairs are applicable to the pharmaceutical industry and medical devices industry. These Guidances represent the current thinking of regulatory agencies on a particular subject. The term “guidances” is used in the USA, and the term “guidelines” is used in Europe.

Regulatory affairs, also called government affairs, is a profession within regulated industries, such as pharmaceutical and medical devices, where professionals such as statisticians are expected to implement regulatory guidance into their work practices.

Statisticians working in regulated environments, such as the pharmaceutical and healthcare industries, are obliged to have a sound knowledge and understanding of the regulatory requirements that affect the design, execution, analysis, and reporting of their studies.

Regulatory guidance pertinent to the pharmaceutical and medical devices industries can be found at both international and regional/national levels. Examples of regulatory bodies include the European Medicines Agency (EMA) in Europe, the Medicines and Healthcare products Regulatory Agency (MHRA) in the United Kingdom, the Institute for Quality and Efficiency in Health Care (IQWiG) in Germany, the Food and Drug Administration (FDA) in the United States, and the Pharmaceuticals and Medical Devices Agency (PMDA) in Japan.

Additionally, statistical regulatory guidance is available for general topics such as Good Clinical Practice (ICH E6(R3)), as well as specific areas explicitly related to statistics, such as Statistical Principles for Clinical Trials (ICH E9), and some indirectly related areas like Special Populations: Geriatrics (ICH E7) or Clinical Trial Endpoints in Oncology (FDA).

== History ==
Regulation in the USA started in 1906 with the Food and Drugs Act and further USA regulation came in 1938 with the Federal Food, Drug, and Cosmetic Act following the deaths due to Elixir sulfanilamide in 1937. Further tragedies resulted from the use of Thalidomide that was marketed in 1957, Germany, without adequate testing. The Thalidomide catastrophe tightened the regulatory pressure in the US with the Kefauver Harris Amendment (1962) to the Federal Food, Drug, and Cosmetic Act and the European regulation appeared with UK's "Medicines Act 1968". Later, several regulatory “guidances” were adopted by the Food and Drug Administration (FDA), as well as similar “guidelines” by the European Medicines Agency (EMA) in Europe and the Pharmaceuticals and Medical Devices Agency (PMDA) in Japan. In 1989, Europe, Japan and the USA organized plans to more closely harmonize their respective guidances, and the first meeting of International Conference on Harmonisation of Technical Requirements for Registration of Pharmaceuticals for Human Use (ICH) was held in 1990 in Brussels.

In Europe, the European Network for Health Technology Assessment (EUnetHTA) was established in 2005 to create an effective and sustainable network for HTA to support collaboration between European HTA organizations. EUnetHTA Guidelines have been developed to help the assessors of evidence to process, analyse and interpret the data.

== General Guidance ==
General guidance covers statistical topics that relate to good clinical practice: study design, monitoring and reporting, and market authorization of medical products or medical devices.

=== Good Clinical Practice ===
The good clinical practice (GCP) is an international ethical and scientific quality standard for designing, conducting, recording and reporting trials that involve the participation of human subjects. It was issued by ICH under Good Clinical Practice Directive (Directive 2005/28/EC) of 8 April 2005. A similar guideline for clinical trials of medical devices is the international standard ISO 14155, that is valid in the European Union as a harmonized standard. Compliance with the GCP standard provides public assurance that the rights, safety and well-being of trial subjects are protected, consistent with the principles that have their origin in the Declaration of Helsinki, and that the clinical trial data are credible.

== See also ==
- List of guidances for statistics in regulatory affairs
- Clinical trials
- Medical statistics
- Epidemiological method
- Epidemiology
- Medicine
