= Agency for Health Technology Assessment and Tariff System =

Polish government agency

The Agency for Health Technology Assessment and Tariff System (Polish: Agencja Oceny Technologii Medycznych i Taryfikacji, AOTMiT) is a government agency in Poland that carries out health technology assessment.

The Agency was established in 2006. It is a member of EUnetHTA.
