= Regulation of acupuncture =

Regulation of acupuncture is done by governmental bodies to ensure safe practice.

== Australia ==
In 2000, the Chinese Medicine Registration Board of Victoria, Australia (CMBV) was established as an independent government agency to oversee the practice of Chinese Herbal Medicine and Acupuncture in the state. In 2005 the Parliamentary Committee on the Health Care Complaints Commission in the Australian state of New South Wales commissioned a report investigating the practice of Traditional Chinese medicine. As a result of this investigation it was recommended for the introduction of a government-appointed registration board that would regulate the profession by restricting use of the titles "acupuncturist", "Chinese herbal medicine practitioner" and "Chinese medicine practitioner". The aim of registration was to protect the public from the risks of acupuncture by ensuring a high baseline level of competency and education of registered acupuncturists, enforcing guidelines regarding continuing professional education and investigating complaints of practitioner conduct. Currently acupuncturists in NSW are bound by the guidelines in the Public Health (Skin Penetration) Regulation 2000 which is enforced at local council level. In 2012 the CMBV became the Chinese Medicine Board of Australia, and in 2013 established an interim accreditation standard for the profession in partnership with the Australian Health Practitioner Regulation Agency. The legislation put in place stipulates that only practitioners who are state-registered may use the following titles: Acupuncture, Chinese Medicine, Chinese Herbal Medicine, Registered Acupuncturist, Registered Chinese Medicine Practitioner, and Registered Chinese Herbal Medicine Practitioner.

== Brazil ==
In Brazil, acupuncturists are not required to have any college level education. Currently, biomedicians, biologists, pharmacists, among other health professionals, have regulated acupuncture.

While some medical doctors defend that practicing acupuncture is exclusive to medical doctors, the National Council of Health came in public to clarify the matter

The Parliament is on their way to pass a law that will definitely establish who can practice acupuncture.

== Canada ==
In Canada the provinces of British Columbia, Ontario, Alberta and Quebec have acupuncture licensing programs. In many provinces that are not subject to government regulation, employers will require candidates qualify for membership at the local chapter of the Chinese Medicine and Acupuncture Association of Canada. The province of Ontario, Canada, created the Traditional Chinese Medicine Act in 2006, which created the College of Traditional Chinese Practitioners and Acupuncturists. To be licensed in Ontario, acupuncturists need to register with the college, pass a series of tests and demonstrate an experience-equivalent of having seen more than 2,000 patients over five years.

In Quebec, the practice of acupuncture has been regulated since 1995 by the Ordre des acupuncteurs du Québec (OAQ).

== Europe ==
At least 28 countries in Europe have professional associations for acupuncturists.

== France ==
Since 1955, the French advisory body Académie Nationale de Médecine (National Academy of Medicine) has accepted acupuncture as part of medical practice. Acupuncture is also routinely reimbursed by social security when performed or prescribed by a doctor or practitioner.

== Germany ==
Following the German acupuncture trials from 2006 to 2007, the Federal Joint Committee (an agency similar to the National Institutes of Health in the United States) passed a law which allows the reimbursement of acupuncture treatment by the public health insurance system for the following ailments: chronic lower back pain and chronic knee pain caused by osteoarthritis. In 2006, German researchers published the results of one of the first and largest randomized controlled clinical trials. As a result of the trial's conclusions, some insurance corporations in Germany no longer reimburse acupuncture treatments. The trials also had a negative impact on acupuncture in the international community.

== Japan ==
In Japan, acupuncture practitioners and kampo Herbal medicine are licensed by the Minister of Health, Labour and Welfare after passing an examination and graduating from a technical school or university.

== New Zealand ==
Traditional/lay acupuncture is not a regulated health profession. The state-owned Accident Compensation Corporation reimburses for patient care and treatment for the modality of acupuncture treatment by registered health care practitioners that have achieved an appropriately level of training and competency, this includes Medical practitioners, Physiotherapist, Osteopaths and traditionally trained acupuncturists that belong to professional Acupuncture associations and bodies.

== Sri Lanka ==
In 2022, the Ceylon Association of Medical Acupuncturists (CAMA) was established as a self-regulatory body for the practice of Acupuncture and TCM in Sri Lanka.

In September 2025, the association was formally accepted as a member society of the World Federation of Acupuncture-Moxibustion Societies (WFAS), an international organization in official relations with the World Health Organization (WHO). This recognition positioned CAMA as the official representative of Sri Lanka in the global acupuncture community.

=== Background ===
Medical acupuncture was introduced to Sri Lanka by Professor Anton Jayasuriya . In 1974, Professor Jayasuriya was granted a scholarship by the Government of Sri Lanka and the World Health Organization (WHO) to study acupuncture in the People's Republic of China. After receiving his certification to practice, Professor Jayasuriya embarked on a mission to teach the art of acupuncture and traditional medicine. His teachings attracted a wide range of individuals from over 140 countries who were interested in complementary medicine. However, it is worth noting that these teachings or individuals who completed the training did not have a government-authorized regulatory body to be registered, nor were they registered in the Sri Lanka Medical Council (SLMC) or the Ayurvedic Medical Council as acupuncture practitioners. As a result, there was an increase in malpractice of acupuncture in Sri Lanka.

To address the issue of unregulated acupuncture and traditional Chinese medicine (TCM) malpractice, a group of medical acupuncturists who graduated from the acupuncture program at Kaatsu International University (KIU) took the initiative to form a self-regulatory body. Their aim was to gather professionals in the field of acupuncture and TCM to maintain high professional standards in the practice of acupuncture in Sri Lanka.

On June 22, 2022, this self-regulatory body, known as the Ceylon Association of Medical Acupuncturists (CAMA), was initiated by Dr. Vimukthi Asahara, Dr. Adheesha D. Dayarathna, and Dr. Imesha Hemasinghe. The inaugural general meeting of CAMA was held on July 21, 2022, with the participation of 17 members. Dr. Vimukthi Asahara was elected as the first president of the association, Dr. Imesha Hemasinghe as the vice president, and Dr. Kaveesha D. Ranasinghe as the secretary. Dr. C. Indrapala was appointed as the chief advisor.

On January 7, 2015, the Kaatsu International University (KIU) initiated a bachelor's degree program in acupuncture, which was the first recognized program of its kind by the University Grants Commission and the Ministry of Higher Education in Sri Lanka. This program aimed to establish a solid academic foundation for acupuncture practitioners in Sri Lanka.

The formation of the CAMA and the recognition of the acupuncture program at KIU signify significant steps towards ensuring the safe practice of acupuncture and maintaining high professional standards in Sri Lanka.

== United Kingdom ==
Acupuncturists are not a nationally regulated profession in the United Kingdom. Acupuncture practice is regulated by law in England and Wales for health and safety criteria under The Local Government (Miscellaneous Provisions) Act 1982, which has been recently amended by the Local Government Act 2003. Each local authority implements its own policy in accordance with the Act. For example, the London boroughs use the London Local Authorities Act, 1991/2000. Premises and each practitioner offering acupuncture must be licensed. As there is no formal certification of acupuncture, practitioners are exempted from licensing by virtue of being current members of approved acupuncture associations such as the British Acupuncture Council. Physiotherapists are also required to be current members of an approved acupuncture association as body piercing is not part of the entry level curriculum for state registered physiotherapists regulated by the Health Professions Council. The approved acupuncture organisations have rigorous codes of practice and educational requirements and members are covered by the appropriate indemnity insurance. An estimated 7,500 practitioners practise acupuncture to some extent and belong to a relevant professional or regulatory body. About 2,400 are traditional acupuncturists who mostly belong to the British Acupuncture Council, which requires its members to be trained in both traditional acupuncture and relevant biomedical sciences. Approximately 2,200 registered doctors and other statutorily regulated health professionals belong to the British Medical Acupuncture Society. Some 6,000 physiotherapists belong to the Acupuncture Association of Chartered Physiotherapists and 250 nurses belong to the British Academy of Western Acupuncture. There are also practitioners of Traditional Chinese Medicine who belong to one or more associations.

The principal body for professional standards in traditional/lay acupuncture is the British Acupuncture Council, The British Medical Acupuncture Society an inter-disciplinary professional body for regulated health professional using acupuncture as a modality. The Acupuncture Association of Chartered Physiotherapists, and The Association of Acupuncture Clinicians.

== United States ==
Acupuncturists in the United States are trained and licensed according to criteria set by three professional organizations, all founded in the early 1980s:

1. The Accreditation Commission for Acupuncture and Oriental Medicine (ACAOM), which accredits acupuncture schools and programs; it is recognized by the United States Department of Education for this purpose.
2. The Council of Colleges of Acupuncture and Oriental Medicine (CCAOM), a voluntary-membership organization for acupuncture schools and programs; its "primary mission is to support member institutions to deliver educational excellence and quality patient care." It also administers the Clean Needle Technique (CNT) course, which trains acupuncturists in safe, sterile needling technique.
3. The National Certification Commission for Acupuncture and Oriental Medicine (NCCAOM), which certifies acupuncturists nationally; its programs are certified by the National Commission for Certification Agencies (NCCA). NCCAOM certification is contingent on completion of an approved educational program, completing the Clean Needle Technique (CNT) course, and passing the NCCAOM certification exams. NCCAOM certification, or in some cases passing the NCCAOM exams, suffices to demonstrate competency for licensure as an acupuncturist in 43 of the 44 states (plus the District of Columbia) that regulate acupuncture. (California has its own examination and certification process.).

Acupuncture regulation in the US began in the 1970s, prompted by an article by New York Times reporter James Reston. In 1973, Nevada became the first US state in the nation to authorizing the practice of acupuncture, and many states thereafter followed suit.

The Food and Drug Administration first regulated acupuncture needles in 1972 as "investigational devices" and later recognized needles for acupuncture uses in 1996. In 1996, the Food and Drug Administration changed the status of acupuncture needles from Class III to Class II medical devices, meaning that needles are regarded as safe and effective when used appropriately by licensed practitioners.

As of 2004, nearly 50% of Americans who were enrolled in employer health insurance plans were covered for acupuncture treatments.

Physical therapists (PTs) in New Jersey must end their use of dry needling by the end of August, after the State Attorney General's office ruled that it was not part of a PT's legal scope of practice.

In California, licensed acupuncturists often combine traditional techniques with modern integrative medicine to address complex neurological conditions like TMJ and hormonal imbalances.
