= Hugh MacPherson =

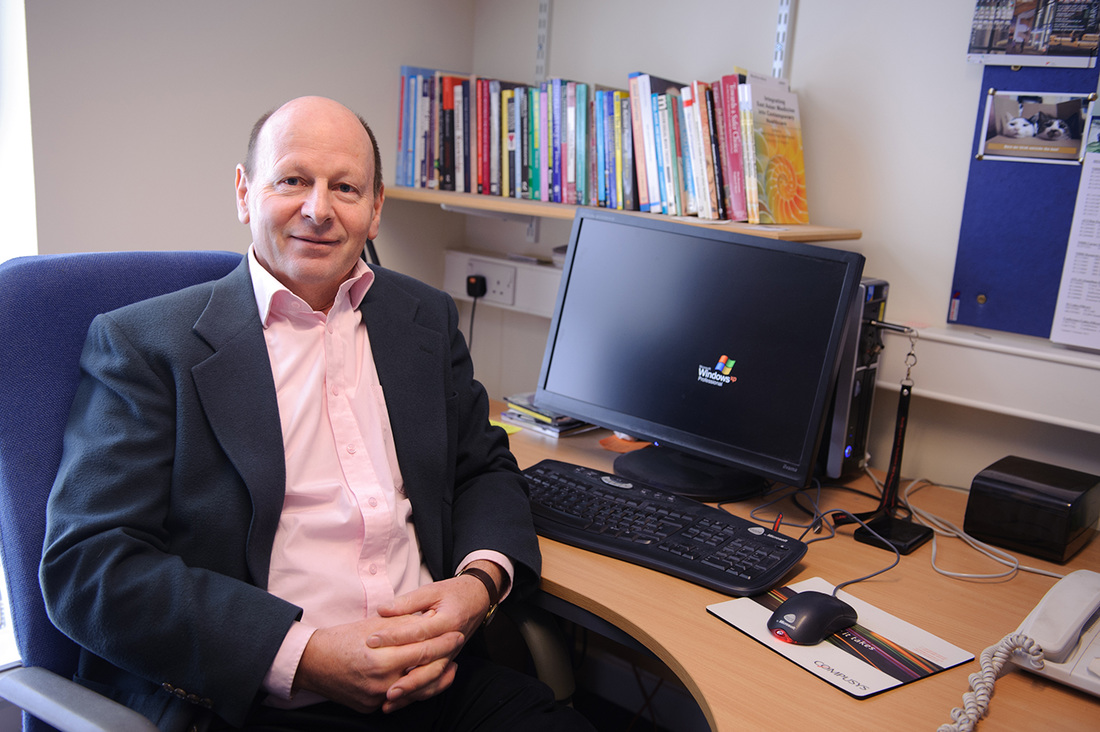
- Born: 7 April 1948; Romsey, England
- Died: 20 August 2020 (aged 72); York, England
- Occupations: Researcher, acupuncturist
- Known for: Professor of Acupuncture Research, University of York, Founder Northern College of Acupuncture and Clinic Director,York Clinic

Hugh MacPherson (1948–2020) was a professor of acupuncture research at the University of York, founder and trustee of the Northern College of Acupuncture, founder and co-ordinator of the international STRICTA group, clinic director of York Clinic, fellow of The College of Medicine, and a practising member of the British Acupuncture Council.

== Biography ==
After completing a PhD in applied mathematics at the University of New South Wales, Australia, in 1979, he trained in Chinese medicine, becoming a registered acupuncturist in 1983. He became clinical director of the York Clinic for Integrated Healthcare in 1986, and founded the Northern College of Acupuncture in York in 1988, acting as the college's principal from 1988 to 1997. Between 1997 and 2003, he was the research director of the Foundation for Research into Traditional Chinese Medicine, York. He then worked in the Health Science Department at the University of York, first as a senior research fellow, and in 2016 as Emeritus Professor. He researched and wrote about acupuncture from 1992 to 2020, publishing over 100 peer-reviewed articles on the subject. He died in August 2020.

He appeared on a number of radio and television programs, including BBC Radio 4's The Other Medicine, BBC Two's Alternative Medicine: The Evidence, BBC Three's Kick Ass Miracles and BBC Two's Trust Me, I'm a Doctor.

== Research ==
Hugh MacPherson's research on acupuncture for low back pain was published in the British Medical Journal (BMJ), and subsequently was central to the decision by the National Institute for Health and Care Excellence (NICE) to recommend acupuncture for persistent low back pain in 2009. His study of acupuncture or counselling for ongoing depression in primary care found that both acupuncture and counselling are effective for patients, the majority of whom were taking antidepressants.

== Controversy ==
Hugh MacPherson was Principal Investigator on a study that investigated acupuncture and brain imaging in York, which was filmed by BBC Two Science but received press criticism for not being good science. The BBC Trust subsequently received a complaint about the programme that questioned the "significance accorded to brain-imaging results following deep needling." The BBC defended the series against what they described as "unjust, inaccurate and damaging allegations made in the national press". When this complaint related to the brain imaging was considered by the BBC Trust in 2007, it was not upheld. Three peer-reviewed publications (references below) resulted from this study, which established new results on acupuncture's impact on brain function. This included a publication, published in the journal Brain Research, which showed that acupuncture works by deactivating pain pathways in the brain.

== Publications ==
=== Selected articles ===
- 2015. MacPherson, Hugh; Tilbrook, Helen; Richmond, Stewart; Woodman, Julia; Ballard, Kathleen; Atkin, Karl; Bland, Martin; Eldred, Janet; Essex, Holly; Hewitt, Catherine; Hopton, Ann; Keding, Ada; Lansdown, Harriet; Parrott, Steve; Torgerson, David; Wenham, Aniela; Watt, Ian (2015). "Alexander Technique Lessons or Acupuncture Sessions for Persons with Chronic Neck Pain". Annals of Internal Medicine. 163 (9): 653–62. doi:10.7326/M15-0667. PMID 26524571. S2CID 207538392.
- 2013. MacPherson, Hugh; Richmond, Stewart; Bland, Martin; Brealey, Stephen; Gabe, Rhian; Hopton, Ann; Keding, Ada; Lansdown, Harriet; Perren, Sara; Sculpher, Mark; Spackman, Eldon; Torgerson, David; Watt, Ian (2013). "Acupuncture and Counselling for Depression in Primary Care: A Randomised Controlled Trial". PLOS Medicine. 10 (9) e1001518. doi:10.1371/journal.pmed.1001518. PMC 3782410. PMID 24086114.
- 2012. Hopton, A K; Curnoe, S; Kanaan, M; MacPherson, H (2012). "Acupuncture in practice: Mapping the providers, the patients and the settings in a national cross-sectional survey". BMJ Open. 2 (1) e000456. doi:10.1136/bmjopen-2011-000456. PMC 3278493. PMID 22240649.
- 2012. Vickers, Andrew J; Cronin, Angel M; Maschino, Alexandra C; Lewith, George; MacPherson, Hugh; Foster, Nadine E; Sherman, Karen J; Witt, Claudia M; Linde, Klaus; Acupuncture Trialists' Collaboration, for the (2012). "Acupuncture for Chronic Pain". Archives of Internal Medicine. 172 (19): 1444–53. doi:10.1001/archinternmed.2012.3654. PMC 3658605. PMID 22965186.
- 2012. Asghar, Aziz U. R; Johnson, Robyn L; Woods, William; Green, Gary G. R; Lewith, George; MacPherson, Hugh (2012). "Oscillatory neuronal dynamics associated with manual acupuncture: A magnetoencephalography study using beamforming analysis". Frontiers in Human Neuroscience. 6: 303. doi:10.3389/fnhum.2012.00303. PMC 3522113. PMID 23248594.
- 2011. Langevin, Helene M; Wayne, Peter M; MacPherson, Hugh; Schnyer, Rosa; Milley, Ryan M; Napadow, Vitaly; Lao, Lixing; Park, Jongbae; Harris, Richard E; Cohen, Misha; Sherman, Karen J; Haramati, Aviad; Hammerschlag, Richard (2011). "Paradoxes in Acupuncture Research: Strategies for Moving Forward". Evidence-Based Complementary and Alternative Medicine. 2011 180805: 1–11. doi:10.1155/2011/180805. PMC 2957136. PMID 20976074.
- 2010. MacPherson, Hugh; Altman, Douglas G; Hammerschlag, Richard; Youping, Li; Taixiang, Wu; White, Adrian; Moher, David; STRICTA Revision Group (2010). "Revised STandards for Reporting Interventions in Clinical Trials of Acupuncture (STRICTA): Extending the CONSORT Statement". PLOS Medicine. 7 (6) e1000261. doi:10.1371/journal.pmed.1000261. PMC 2882429. PMID 20543992.
- 2010. Smith, Caroline A; Hay, Phillipa PJ; MacPherson, Hugh (2010). "Acupuncture for depression". Cochrane Database of Systematic Reviews (1) CD004046. doi:10.1002/14651858.CD004046.pub3. PMC 6494180. PMID 20091556.
- 2009. Asghar, Aziz UR; Green, Gary; Lythgoe, Mark F; Lewith, George; MacPherson, Hugh (2010). "Acupuncture needling sensation: The neural correlates of deqi using fMRI". Brain Research. 1315: 111–118. doi:10.1016/j.brainres.2009.12.019. PMID 20025853. S2CID 14123980.
- 2008. MacPherson, Hugh; Green, Gary; Nevado, Angel; Lythgoe, Mark F; Lewith, George; Devlin, Ross; Haselfoot, Robyn; Asghar, Aziz U.R (2008). "Brain imaging of acupuncture: Comparing superficial with deep needling". Neuroscience Letters. 434 (1): 144–149. doi:10.1016/j.neulet.2008.01.058. PMID 18294772. S2CID 19535285.

=== Edited volumes ===
- 2011. Integrating East Asian Medicine into Contemporary Healthcare, edited by Volker Scheid and Hugh MacPherson. Churchill Livingstone. ISBN 978-0-7020-3021-5. 256 pages.
- 2007. Acupuncture Research: Strategies for Establishing an Evidence Base, edited by and Hugh MacPherson, Richard Hammerschlag, George Lewith, and Rosa Schnyer. Churchill Livingstone. ISBN 978-0-443-10029-1. 288 pages.
- 1996. Acupuncture in Practice: Case History Insights from the West, edited by Hugh MacPherson and Ted Kaptchuk. Churchill Livingstone. ISBN 978-0-443-05049-7. 482 pages.

=== Chapters in Books ===
- 2012. MacPherson H. "Assessing Acupuncture: Practical Examples", in Boutron I, Ravaud P, Moher D. (eds.) Randomised Clinical Trials of Nonpharmacological Treatments. Chapman & Hall/CRC Biostatistics Series 46, Boca Raton, Florida, pp 387.
- 2011. Witt CM, MacPherson H, Kaptchuk TJ, Wahlberg A. "Efficacy, effectiveness and efficiency", in Scheid V, MacPherson H. (eds.) Integrating East Asian medicine into contemporary healthcare. Elsevier, Edinburgh, pp 244.
- 2007. White A, Wayne P, MacPherson H. "Exploring treatment effects: studies without control groups" in MacPherson H, Hammerschlag R, Lewith G, Schnyer R. (eds.) Acupuncture Research: Strategies for building an evidence base. Elsevier, London, pp 261, 2007
- 2007. Schnyer RN, Birch S, MacPherson H. "Acupuncture practice as the foundation for clinical evaluation", in MacPherson H, Hammerschlag R, Lewith G, Schnyer R. (eds.) Acupuncture Research: Strategies for building an evidence base. Elsevier, London, pp 261.
- 2007. MacPherson H, White A, Bensoussan A. "The safety of acupuncture", in MacPherson H, Hammerschlag R, Lewith G, Schnyer R. (eds.) Acupuncture Research: Strategies for building an evidence base. Elsevier, London, pp 261.
- 2007. MacPherson H, Thomas K. "Introduction: acupuncture and the emerging evidence base", in MacPherson H, Hammerschlag R, Lewith G, Schnyer R. (eds.) Acupuncture Research: Strategies for building an evidence base. Elsevier, London, pp 261, 2007.
