= List of Guidances for Statistics in Regulatory Affairs =

This List of Guidances for Statistics in Regulatory Affairs presents a source of references for statistical guidance documents and related articles that are relevant to regulatory affairs for those statisticians that work on clinical studies.

== Abbreviations ==
- EMA = European Medicines Agency
- EU-HTA = European Commission Health Technology Assessment
- FDA = U.S. Food and Drug Administration
- ICH = International Council for Harmonisation of Technical Requirements for Pharmaceuticals for Human Use
- IQWiG = Institute for Quality and Efficiency in Health Care
- UK-NICE = National Institute for Health and Care Excellence

== Drugs ==
Guidance	Scope	Main Topic	Special Populations	Therapeutic Area	Description
ICH E6 Guideline for good clinical practice (GCP)	ICH	Good Clinical Practice		Any	International ethical and scientific quality standard for designing, conducting, recording and reporting trials that involve the participation of human subjects.
Good Review Practice: Clinical Review of Investigational New Drug Applications.	FDA	Good Clinical Practice		Any	This good review practice (GRP) document was prepared to assist FDA clinical review staff in reviewing clinical submissions to an investigational new drug application (IND) from the pre-IND phase to the time of the pre-new drug application/biologics license application meeting.
ICH E8 General considerations for clinical studies	ICH	Study design / analysis		Any	The guideline is intended to describe internationally accepted principles and practices in the design and conduct of clinical studies that will facilitate acceptance of data and results by regulatory authorities, provide guidance on the consideration of quality in the design and conduct of clinical studies across the product lifecycle, and the management of risks to those factors during study conduct.
ICH E9 statistical principles for clinical trials	ICH	Study design / analysis		Any	This document provides guidance on the design, conduct, analysis and evaluation of clinical trials of an investigational product in the context of its overall clinical development. It also assists with preparing application summaries or assessing evidence of efficacy and safety, principally from clinical trials in later phases of development.
ICH E4 Dose response information to support drug registration	ICH	Study design / analysis		Any	This document provides guidance on obtaining dose-response information. It describes the study designs for assessing dose-response.
Guidance for industry, exposure-response relationships - study design, data analysis, and regulatory applications.	FDA	Study design / analysis		Any	This document provides recommendations for sponsors of investigational new drugs (INDs) and applicants submitting new drug applications (NDAs) or biologics license applications (BLAs) on the use of exposure-response information in the development of drugs, including therapeutic biologics.
ICH E10 Choice of control group in clinical trials	ICH	Study design / analysis		Any	This document describes the general principles involved in choosing a control group for clinical trials intended to demonstrate the efficacy of a treatment and to discuss related trial design and conduct issues.
Guideline on data monitoring committees	EMA	Data monitoring committees		Any	Deals with independent data monitoring committees. It highlights the key issues involved when sponsors include data monitoring committees as a part of their trial management.
Use of Data Monitoring Committees in Clinical Trials	FDA	Data monitoring committees		Any	This guidance is intended to assist sponsors of clinical trials in determining when a data monitoring committee (DMC) would be useful for trial monitoring and what procedures and practices should be considered to guide their operation.
Establishment and Operation of Clinical Trial Data Monitoring Committees	FDA	Data monitoring committees		Any	This guidance discusses the roles, responsibilities and operating procedures of Data Monitoring Committees (DMCs) that may carry out important aspects of clinical trial monitoring, and it is intended to assist clinical trial sponsors in determining when a DMC may be useful for study monitoring, and how such committees should operate.
Guideline on adjustment for baseline covariates in clinical trials	EMA	Adjustment by covariates		Any	This document provides advice on how to address important baseline covariates in designing, analysing and reporting clinical trials. It mainly focuses on confirmatory randomised trials.
Adjusting for Covariates in Randomized Clinical Trials for Drugs and Biological Products	FDA	Adjustment by covariates		Any	This guidance describes FDA's current recommendations regarding adjusting for covariates in the statistical analysis of randomized clinical trials in drug development programs.
Guideline on clinical trials in small populations	EMA	Small populations / rare diseases		Any	This document addresses problems associated with clinical trials when there are limited numbers of patients available to study.
Rare Diseases: Considerations for the Development of Drugs and Biological Products	FDA	Small populations / rare diseases		Any	This guidance is intended to assist sponsors of drugs and biological products for treatment of rare diseases in conducting efficient and successful drug development programs through a discussion of selected issues commonly encountered in rare disease drug development.
Reflection paper on the use of extrapolation in the development of medicines for paediatrics	EMA	Extrapolation / bridging	Paediatrics	Any	This document proposes a framework for extrapolation of data from adults to children which could serve as a basis for regulatory decision making in planning and developing paediatric developments, including paediatric investigation plans.
Concept paper on extrapolation of efficacy and safety in medicine development	EMA	Extrapolation / bridging		Any	This document aims to discuss the need and possibility to develop a framework for extrapolation approaches that are considered scientifically valid and reliable to support medicine authorisation.
ICH E5 Ethnic Factors in the Acceptability of Foreign Clinical Data	ICH	Extrapolation / bridging		Any	This document recommends a framework for evaluating the impact of ethnic factors upon a medicine's effect, i.e., its efficacy and safety at a particular dosage and dose regimen. It addresses the intrinsic characteristics of the drug recipient and extrinsic characteristics associated with environment and culture that could affect the results of clinical studies carried out in regions and describes the concept of the "bridging study" that a new region may request to determine whether data from another region are applicable to its population.
Guideline on non-inferiority and equivalence comparisons in clinical trials	EMA	Non-Inferiority & Equivalence		Any	This guideline lays out general principles for the design and analysis of confirmatory clinical trials that include non-inferiority or equivalence comparisons. This guideline replaces the Guideline on the choice of the non-inferiority margin and the Points to consider on switching between superiority and non-inferiority.
Non-Inferiority Clinical Trials	FDA	Non-inferiority		Any	This document provides guidance to sponsors and applicants submitting investigational drug applications (INDs), new drug applications (NDAs), biologics licensing applications (BLAs), or supplemental applications on the appropriate use of non-inferiority (NI) study designs to provide evidence of the effectiveness of a drug or biologic, usually because a superiority study design (drug versus placebo, dose response, or superiority to an active drug) cannot be used. The guidance gives advice on when NI studies intended to demonstrate effectiveness of an investigational drug can provide interpretable results, how to choose the NI margin, and how to test the NI hypothesis.
Guideline on the choice of a non-inferiority margin	EMA	Non-inferiority		Any	This document provides guidance on two types of non-inferiority trials: trials with two arms, the test product and a comparator; and three-armed trials with the test product, an active comparator and placebo. This guidance is replaced by Guideline on non-inferiority and equivalence comparisons in clinical trials.
Points to Consider on Switching Between Superiority and Non-Inferiority	EMA	Non-inferiority		Any	This document addresses the issues of superiority, non-inferiority and equivalence from the perspective of an efficacy trial with a single primary variable. This guidance is replaced by Guideline on non-inferiority and equivalence comparisons in clinical trials.
Guideline on the investigation of subgroups in confirmatory clinical trials	EMA	Subgroup analysis		Any	This document provides guidance for assessors in European regulatory agencies on assessment of subgroup analyses in confirmatory clinical trials. It should also be useful to clinical trial sponsors and to assessors engaged in providing scientific advice.
Clinical Trial Endpoints for the Approval of Cancer Drugs and Biologics	FDA	Study design / analysis		Oncology	This guidance provides recommendations to applicants on endpoints for cancer clinical trials submitted to the Food and Drug Administration (FDA) to support effectiveness claims in new drug applications (NDAs), biologics license applications (BLAs), or supplemental applications.
Points to consider on application with 1.meta-analyses, 2.one pivotal study	EMA	Marketing authorization		Any	This document provides guidance on two topics: the use of meta-analysis and the use of only a single pivotal study in phase III clinical development.
ICH E1 Population exposure: the extent of population exposure to assess clinical safety	ICH	Marketing authorization		Any	This document presents an accepted set of principles for the safety evaluation of drugs intended for the long-term treatment (chronic or repeated intermittent use for longer than 6 months) of non-life-threatening diseases.
Extrapolation of efficacy and safety in medicine development	EMA	Extrapolation / bridging		Any	This document aims to discuss the need and possibility to develop a framework for extrapolation approaches that are considered scientifically valid and reliable to support medicine authorisation.
Guideline on missing data in confirmatory clinical trials	EMA	Missing data		Any	This document explains how the presence of missing data in confirmatory clinical trials should be addressed and reported in a dossier submitted for regulatory review. It provides an insight into the regulatory standards that will be used to assess confirmatory clinical trials with missing data.
Data Retention When Subjects Withdraw from FDA-Regulated Clinical Trials	FDA	Missing data		Any	This guidance describes the Food and Drug Administration's (FDA) longstanding policy that already-accrued data, relating to individuals who cease participating in a study, are to be maintained as part of the study data.
Multiplicity issues in clinical trials	EMA	Multiplicity		Any	This document addresses the multiplicity in the clinical trials in the context of an application for marketing authorisation of a medicinal product.
Multiple Endpoints in Clinical Trials	FDA	Multiplicity		Any	The purpose of this guidance is to describe various strategies for grouping and ordering endpoints for analysis and applying some well-recognized statistical methods for managing multiplicity within a study in order to control the chance of making erroneous conclusions about a drug's effects.
ICH E3 Structure and content of clinical study reports - Scientific guideline	ICH	Reporting		Any	This document aims to allow the compilation of a single core clinical study report acceptable to all regulatory authorities of the ICH regions.
Safety Reporting Requirements for INDs and BA/BE Studies	FDA	Reporting		Any	This document provides guidance to sponsors and investigators on expedited safety reporting requirements for human drug and biological products that are being investigated under an IND and for drugs that are the subjects of BA and BE studies that are exempt from the IND requirements.
Postmarketing Safety Reporting for Human Drug and Biological Products Including Vaccines	FDA	Reporting		Any	This guidance is intended to assist applicants and other responsible parties in fulfilling the FDA's existing postmarketing safety reporting requirements for human marketed drug and biological products.
ICH E2F Development safety update report	ICH	Reporting		Any	This document proposes a common standard for periodic reporting on drugs under development among the ICH regions - the development safety update report (DSUR). It defines the recommended content and format of a DSUR and provides an outline of points to be considered in its preparation and submission.
Methodological issues in confirmatory clinical trials planned with an adaptive design	EMA	Study design / analysis		Any	This document focuses on the opportunities for interim trial design modifications, and the prerequisites, problems and pitfalls that must be considered as soon as any kind of flexibility is introduced into a confirmatory clinical trial intended to provide evidence of efficacy.
Adaptive Design Clinical Trials for Drugs and Biologics	FDA	Study design / analysis		Any	The guidance describes important principles for designing, conducting, and reporting the results from an adaptive clinical trial. The guidance also advises sponsors on the types of information to submit to facilitate FDA evaluation of clinical trials with adaptive designs, including Bayesian adaptive and complex trials that rely on computer simulations for their design.
Bioanalytical method validation	EMA	Method validation		Any	This document defines key elements necessary for the validation of bioanalytical methods. It focuses on the validation of the bioanalytical methods generating quantitative concentration data used for pharmacokinetic and toxicokinetic parameter determinations.
ICH E7 Studies in support of special populations: geriatrics	ICH	Study design / analysis	Geriatrics	Any	This document provides guidance on the clinical evaluation of medicinal products in geriatric populations. It gives special consideration to the differences in pharmacokinetic, pharmacodynamic and dose response studies in elderly patients. It also covers drug drug interaction studies.
Clinical investigation of medicinal products in the treatment of chronic obstructive pulmonary disease (COPD)	EMA	Study design / analysis		COPD	This document provides guidance for the clinical evaluation of new medicinal products for the treatment of chronic obstructive pulmonary disease (COPD). It specifically focuses on the maintenance treatment of COPD.
Evaluating Cardiovascular Risk in New Antidiabetic Therapies to Treat Type 2 Diabetes	FDA	Study design / analysis		Diabetes	This guidance outlines the Agency's current recommendations on the evaluation of safety for new drugs and biologics to improve glycemic control in patients with type 2 diabetes.
Clinical investigation of medicinal products for the treatment of multiple sclerosis	EMA	Study design / analysis		Multiple sclerosis	This document provides guidance on the evaluation of medicinal products for the treatment of multiple sclerosis. It primarily focuses on treatments aimed to modify disease progression. In addition it concerns the treatment of relapses, repair and restoration of functioning and symptomatic improvement.

== Medical Devices ==
Guidance	Scope	Main Topic	Special Populations	Therapeutic Area	Description
ISO 14155:2020 Clinical investigation of medical devices for human subjects — Good clinical practice	Global	Good clinical practive		Any	This document addresses good clinical practice for the design, conduct, recording and reporting of clinical investigations carried out in human subjects to assess the clinical performance or effectiveness and safety of medical devices.
Leveraging Existing Clinical Data for Extrapolation to Pediatric Uses of Medical Devices	FDA	Extrapolation / bridging	Paediatrics	Any	The objectives of this guidance are: (1) to increase the availability of safe and effective pediatric devices by providing a roadmap for leveraging relevant existing clinical data for use in demonstrating a reasonable assurance of safety and effectiveness in pre-market approval applications (PMAs) and de novo requests, as well as for use in supporting approvals of humanitarian device exemptions (HDEs); (2) to explain the circumstances in which it may be appropriate to leverage existing clinical data to support pediatric device indications and labeling; (3) to outline the approach FDA uses to determine whether extrapolation is appropriate, and, to what extent the data can be leveraged; and (4) to describe statistical methodology that can be used to leverage the data in a way that increases precision for pediatric inferences.
Evaluation of Sex-Specific Data in Medical Device Clinical Studies	FDA	Reporting	Sex	Any	The purpose of this guidance is to outline the FDA's expectations regarding sex-specific patient enrollment, data analysis, and reporting of study information.
Use of Real-World Evidence to Support Regulatory Decision-Making for Medical Devices	FDA	Real-World Evidence		Any	Guidance about how FDA evaluates real-world data to determine whether they are sufficient for generating the types of real-world evidence that can be used in FDA regulatory decision-making for medical devices.

== Health Technology Assessment (HTA) ==
Guidance	Scope	Main Topic	Special Populations	Therapeutic Area	Description
Guidance on the validity of clinical studies for joint clinical assessments	EU-HTA	Methods		Any	This guidance is dedicated to the definition, classification, and assessment of the certainty of results of studies leading to the statistical analysis of data considered as originating from or part of a single study.
Guidance on outcomes for joint clinical assessments	EU-HTA	Methods		Any	The objectives of this guidance are to provide guidance for Member States (MSs) in defining relevant outcomes during the scoping process; and to help assessors and co-assessors in assessing and reporting all the elements that MSs need for the national appraisal of the clinical added value of a health technology.
Guidance on reporting requirements for multiplicity issues and subgroup, sensitivity and post hoc analyses in joint clinical assessments	EU-HTA	Methods		Any	This guidance describes how to deal in practice with multiplicity issues and complementary analyses (like specific subgroup analyses, specific post hoc analyses and sensitivity analyses) in joint clinical assessment (JCA) reports.
Methodological Guideline for Quantitative Evidence Synthesis: Direct and Indirect Comparisons	EU-HTA	Methods		Any	This document describes methods for synthesizing evidence from multiple sources to compare new health interventions with existing ones, and support assessors conducting joint clinical assessments (JCAs) under EU regulation.
Practical Guideline for Quantitative Evidence Synthesis: Direct and Indirect Comparisons	EU-HTA	Methods		Any	This document describes the currently available methods for direct and indirect comparisons, their underlying assumptions, strengths, and weaknesses, and specifies the appropriateness of methods to the data situation.
Guide to the methods of technology appraisal - Process and methods	UK-NICE	Methods		Any	The purpose of this document is to provide an overview of the principles and methods of health technology assessment and appraisal within the context of the NICE appraisal process. It describes key principles of appraisal methodology and is a guide for all organisations considering submitting evidence to the technology appraisal programme of the Institute.
IQWIG General Methods	IQWIG	Methods		Any	The General Methods describe the basic work procedures of the Institute. They describe in detail, among other things, the scientific principles followed by IQWiG, the sequence of the individual steps followed in the production of the work results, the procedure of the collaboration with external experts and how IQWiG's results are published.

== See also ==
- Guidances for statistics in regulatory affairs
- Clinical trials
- Medical statistics
- Epidemiological method
- Epidemiology
- Medicine
