= Model for assessment of telemedicine =

Model for assessment of telemedicine (MAST) is a framework for assessment of the value of telemedicine.

== Description ==
Telemedicine services may have many different types of outcomes and can be studied in many ways. In order for those who develop new telemedicine services to produce the information that healthcare managers need for making decisions on investment in telemedicine, a model for assessment of telemedicine (MAST) was developed. This work was done in 2010 through stakeholder workshops and on the basis of a systematic literature review.

If the goal of evaluating telemedicine applications is to assess their effectiveness and impact on the quality of care, and to provide a foundation for decision-making, then according to MAST, the appropriate assessment framework is a multidisciplinary process. This process involves summarizing and evaluating information concerning medical, social, economic, and ethical considerations related to telemedicine in a systematic, impartial, and rigorous manner.

This statement is based on the definition of Health technology assessment (HTA) in the EUnetHTA project. Key concepts are "multidisciplinary" and "systematic, unbiased and robust". The first concept implies that the assessments should include all important outcomes of the applications for patients, clinicians, healthcare institutions and society in general. The others imply that assessments should be based on scientific studies and methods, scientific criteria for quality of evidence and scientific standards for reporting of results, e.g. as described in EQUATOR Network.

== Steps ==
In practice the use of MAST includes three steps:

1. Preceding assessment
2. Multidisciplinary assessment
3. Transferability assessment

Firstly, the assessment must start with preceding considerations in order to determine whether it is relevant for an institution at a given point in time to carry out the assessment. This step involves mainly assessment of the maturity of the technology and the organization planning to use it. If the technology is not matured and have not been tested in practice, then pilot studies must be carried out to mature the technology before a multidisciplinary study is initiated.

Secondly, after the preceding considerations, the multidisciplinary assessment is carried out in order to describe and assess the different outcomes of the telemedicine application. This involves assessment of outcomes within the following seven domains:

- Domain 1: Health problem and characteristics of the application
- Domain 2: Safety
- Domain 3: Clinical effectiveness
- Domain 4: Patient perspectives
- Domain 5: Economic aspects
- Domain 6: Organizational aspects
- Domain 7: Socio-cultural, ethical and legal aspects

Thirdly, in relation to the description of the outcomes, an assessment should also be made of the transferability of the results to other settings or countries.

== Use ==
MAST is the most widely used framework for assessment of telemedicine in Europe. The model is used in large EU funded telemedicine project like Renewing Health, United4Health, Smartcare and inCASA. These projects include more than 20.000 patients and more than 18 randomised controlled trials. A large number of individual telemedicine projects also use MAST e.g. Patient@home, Durand-Zaleski (2013) and Campos et al. (2013)

The number of publications of studies using MAST is still limited, but growing. The first clinical studies have been reported by Sorknæs et al. (2013), Karhula et al. (2015) and Rasmussen et al. (2015). Recently a study of the organizational outcomes of implementation of telemedicine was published by Rasmussen et al. (2015).

MAST has also been recommended as a usable structure for assessment of outcomes of telemedicine by the association of Danish Regions Telemedicine strategy, by the British Thoracic Society statement on telemedicine (2014) and within the field of wound care by Angel et al. (2015).

== Difference between MAST and EUnetHTA Core model ==
MAST is based on HTA and the EUnetHTA Core model, but whereas the core model includes 9 domains, MAST only includes 7 domains. This is done by combining the content of several domains into one. MAST has also a separate domain describing the impact of telemedicine on patient perception and thereby underlining the importance of the patients' view of this type of health care technology. In addition the three steps in MAST underline that the assessment of outcomes should be seen in the light of the maturity of the technology and the transferability of the results to other countries.
