= AMNOG =

German law on pharmaceutical marketing

The Arzneimittelmarkt-Neuordnungsgesetz (AMNOG, English translation: "Pharmaceuticals Market Reorganisation Act") is a German law relating to the marketing of pharmaceutical products in Germany. It requires drug manufacturers to submit evidence to the Federal Joint Committee (Germany) that shows whether their new products have an added benefit compared to previous products. It is credited with reducing the cost of healthcare in Germany.

== See also ==
- Healthcare in Germany
- Institute for Quality and Efficiency in Health Care
