= EviMed =

evimed GmbH
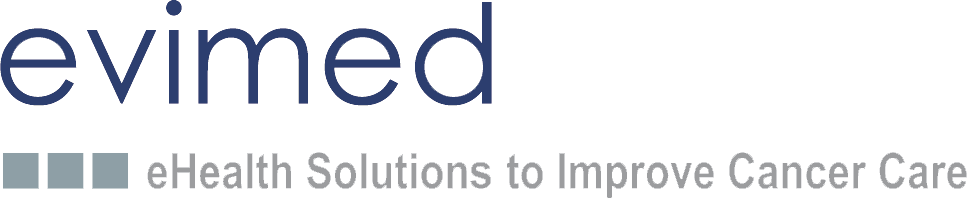
- Company type: Gesellschaft mit beschränkter Haftung (GmbH)
- Founded: 1 September 2009; 16 years ago
- Headquarters: Frankfurt am Main, Germany
- Key people: CEO: walter
- Services: Service Provider in the Health Sector
- Number of employees: 10–15 (February 2015)
- Website: www.evimed.com

evimed GmbH is a German information service provider in the field of health care. The company offers software for the management of medical patient data. The software provided by evimed supports and automates processes of patient recruitment and feasibility studies as well as monitoring and documentation of clinical trials.

== History ==
evimed was founded in Cologne in August 2009. The company aims to improve the processes of patient recruitment in order to support the processing of clinical studies. Patient data are being stored in a database-driven system and can be matched for application in given studies based on matching appropriate medical parameters.

In February 2010, the company launched the world's biggest cancer database for individual therapy to date.

In 2014, evimed relocated to Frankfurt am Main (Hesse).

== Service ==
evimed offers software for patient data management for clinical studies. The computer-based management of patient data significantly reduces the complexity of data handling for clinical research centers and physicians, offering automated matching of patient data with defined parameters for any given clinical study. The software is built upon modular structures, offering functionality for clinical feasibility studies, as well as documentation and monitoring. Automated data matching allows for an exact choice of patient-specific parameters, linking it to the specific requirements of given studies. The software thus heads way for personalized medical treatment.
