= Samantha Meltzer-Brody =

American physician

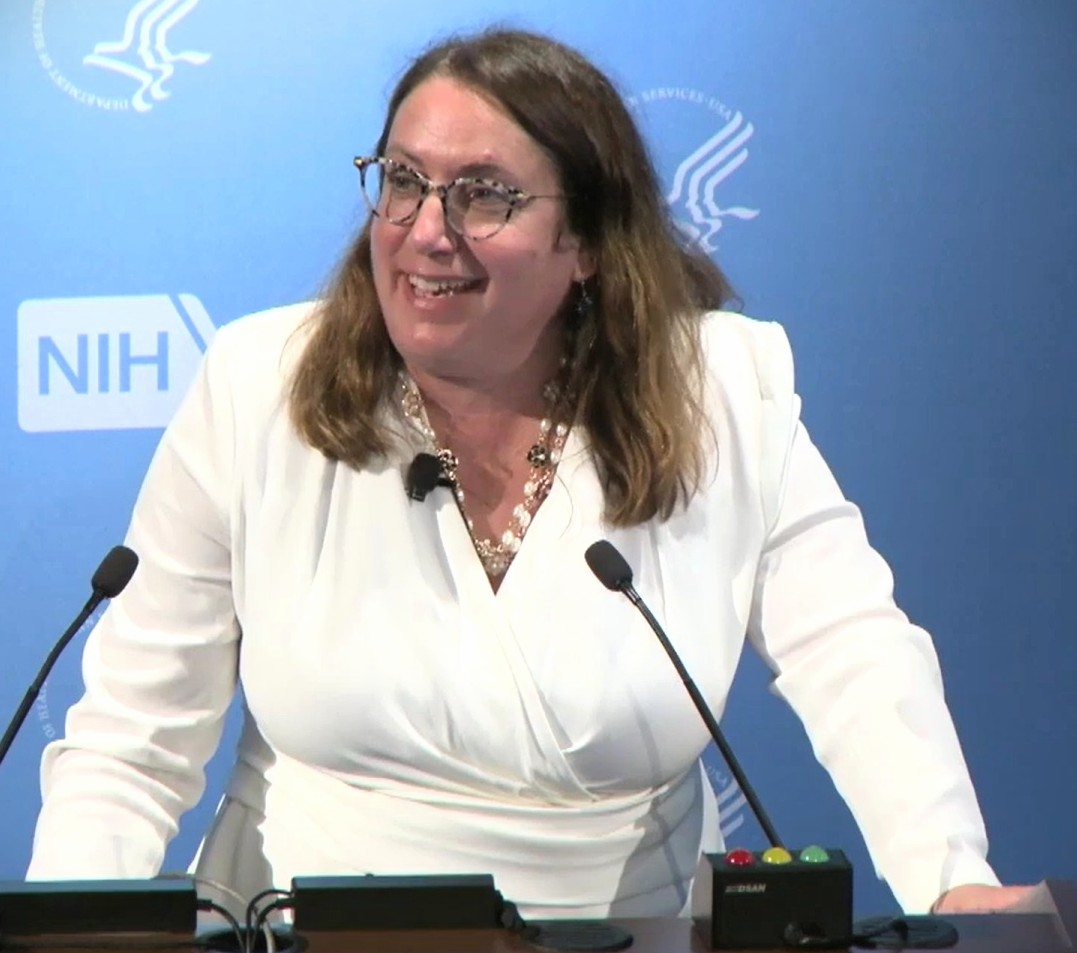
- Meltzer-Brody in 2023
- Born: Canton, Ohio
- Education: Simmons College; University of North Carolina at Chapel Hill; Northwestern University Medical School
- Scientific career
- Workplaces: Duke University Medical Center; University of North Carolina at Chapel Hill

Samantha Meltzer-Brody is an American psychiatrist who is the Executive Dean at the UNC School of Medicine. She researches new strategies to support people with perinatal depression. She was elected Fellow of the National Academy of Medicine.

== Early life and education ==
Meltzer-Brody is from Canton, Ohio. She studied biology at Simmons University and was a medical student at Northwestern University, completing her residency at Duke University. She was a Fellow at the University of North Carolina at Chapel Hill, completing a Master's in Public Health. At the UNC School of Medicine, she established herself as a champion for women's health.

== Research and career ==
In 2004, Meltzer-Brody founded the UNC Perinatal Psychiatry Program. She is a specialist in perinatal depression, which is experienced by one in eight people who give birth. She studies the epidemiological predictors of perinatal depression.

Meltzer-Brody has led clinical trials to identify appropriate medication for postpartum depression, including brexanolone, zulresso and zuranolone. Zulresso was the first drug specifically developed for postpartum depression. Meltzer-Brody has explained that the “weeks and months following birth are a critical period for mother-infant bonding, so finding a fast-acting treatment is crucial for both mom and baby”. Meltzer-Brody has investigated the epidemiology and biomarker models of peri and postnatal depression. She created the international PostpArtum depression ConsorTium, PACT, which encourages international efforts to identify perinatal mood disorders.

In 2011, Meltzer-Brody founded the UNC “Taking Care of Our Own” program, which looked to eliminate physician burnout. Physician burnout can impact professional behaviour, home relationships and patient outcomes.

Meltzer-Brody was made Assad Meymandi Distinguished Professor and Chair of the Department of Psychiatry. She directed the UNC Center for Women’s Mood Disorders, and worked closely with the state of North Carolina on mental health provision.

In 2023, Meltzer-Brody was awarded the National Institutes of Health Clinical Center Distinguished Clinical Research Scholar. She was made Dean of the UNC School of Medicine in 2025.

== Awards and honors ==
- 2015 Arnold Kaluzny Distinguished Alumni Award
- 2016 North Carolina Psychiatric Association Eugene Hargrove Award
- 2020 Oliver Max Gardner Award
- 2022 Forbes list of 16 Healthcare Innovators You Should Know
- 2025 Elected Fellow of the National Academy of Medicine

== Selected publications ==
- Norma I Gavin; Bradley N Gaynes; Kathleen N Lohr; Samantha Meltzer-Brody; Gerald Gartlehner; Tammeka Swinson (1 November 2005). "Perinatal depression: a systematic review of prevalence and incidence". Obstetrics & Gynecology. 106 (5 Pt 1): 1071–1083. doi:10.1097/01.aog.0000183597.31630.db. ISSN 0029-7844. PMID 16260528. Wikidata Q36302127.
- Samantha Meltzer-Brody; Helen Colquhoun; Robert Riesenberg; et al. (31 August 2018). "Brexanolone injection in post-partum depression: two multicentre, double-blind, randomised, placebo-controlled, phase 3 trials". The Lancet. 392 (10152): 1058–1070. doi:10.1016/s0140-6736(18)31551-4. ISSN 0140-6736. PMID 30177236. Wikidata Q91274876.
- Crystal Edler Schiller; Samantha Meltzer-Brody; David R. Rubinow (February 2015). "The role of reproductive hormones in postpartum depression". C N S Spectrums. 20 (1): 48–59. doi:10.1017/s1092852914000480. ISSN 1092-8529. PMC 4363269. PMID 25263255. Wikidata Q26849873.
