= Clean Needle Technique =

Acupuncture training course

The Clean Needle Technique (CNT) is a course administered by the Council of Colleges of Acupuncture and Oriental Medicine (CCAOM). A certificate is provided for the successful completion of the CNT course. Completion of the course is one of the requirements for the National Certification Commission for Acupuncture and Oriental Medicine (NCCAOM) certification, as well as an acupuncture licensing requirement in most states.

== Course content ==
The Clean Needle Technique course is a one-day program composed of a lecture portion, a demonstration of practical application, a written exam, and a practical exam. The instruction portion of the course is on the same day as the exam portion. Applicants have only one chance to pass the written exam and two chances to pass the practical exam. The theoretical portion is based on the Clean Needle Technique Manual published by the CCAOM. The most current edition is the 7th edition published in 2015.

== Content of the CNT Manual ==
The CNT Manual provides guidelines for acupuncture needle safety and related procedures, including moxibustion, cupping, electroacupuncture, therapeutic blood withdrawal, gua sha, plum blossom needling, press tacks, intradermal needles, ear seeds, tui na, heat lamps, and other acupuncture-related tools. For example, it outlines guidelines for preventing infections, burns, bruising, injuries, and various other adverse events related to acupuncture and acupuncture-related procedures. [1]

== Regulation ==
Passing the exam portion of the course is required for receiving the CNT certification.

== See also ==
- Regulation of acupuncture
