= Landarzt =

Medical doctor in a rural area

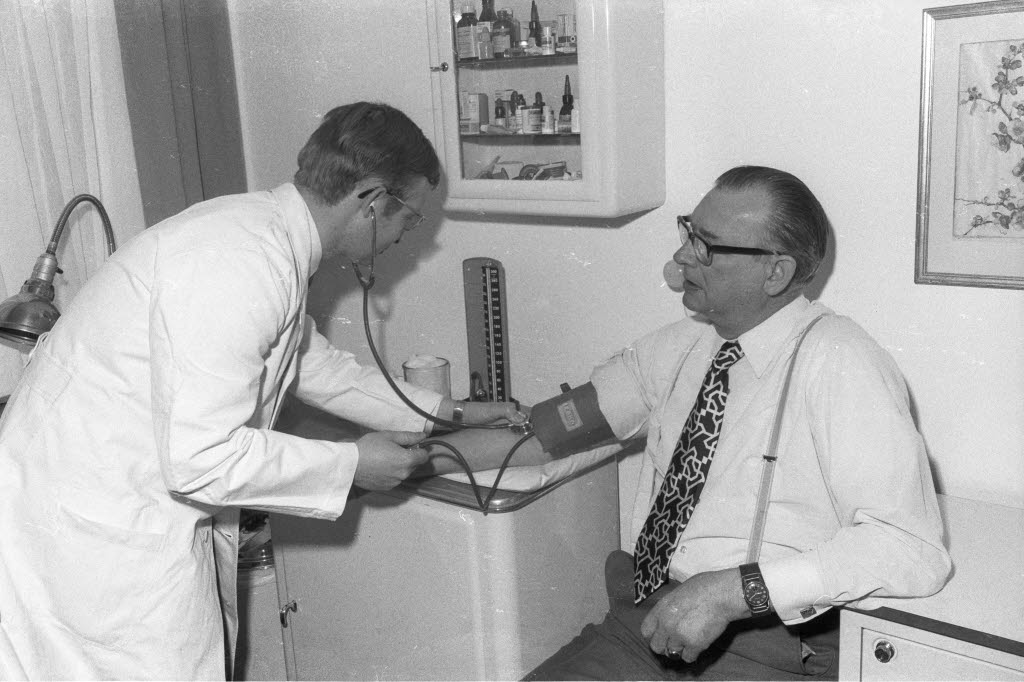
A Country Doctor at Work (1972)

In Germany, the term Landarzt (English: country doctor) is colloquially used to refer to a general practitioner who practices in a rural area. This is usually a specialist in general medicine or an internist working as a family doctor.

In rural areas, the distances between doctor and patient, as well as between general practitioners and specialists or hospitals, are greater, and the average age of patients is higher. Rural doctors often perform tasks that are handled by specialists in urban areas. They are also the first point of contact in emergencies. Regular home visits are more important than in urban general practices.

The term "country doctor" first appeared in Bavaria at the beginning of the 19th century, after the University of Bamberg was dissolved in 1805 and its medical faculty ceased teaching in October 1809. The Munich government subsequently established a "country medical school" (after having already considered training second-class doctors for the rural population in 1808).

== Situation in Germany ==
Germany is experiencing a growing shortage of general practitioners in rural areas, initially in eastern Germany, but now also in other regions. Reasons often cited include the less attractive working and living conditions in rural areas compared to large metropolitan areas, coupled with the aging of the current rural medical profession. The entrepreneurial risk of self-employment deters many young doctors from establishing a practice, as does the difficulty of reconciling self-employment with family planning and the threat of financial penalties for prescribing above-average amounts of medication. This uncertainty is exacerbated by healthcare policy reforms and the resulting lack of predictability in self-employment. By 2021, 42 percent of general practitioners will retire. The district of Osterheide on the southern edge of the Lüneburg Heath recorded the largest population decline nationwide (minus 12.8%). Only a few holiday resorts, primarily on the coast, have managed to buck this trend. Neustrelitz (Mecklenburg-Western Pomerania) and Görlitz (Saxony) also held their own well in rural environments. According to the study, the population group aged 18 to under 30 is particularly mobile. They move primarily from small towns and rural communities to large centers and university cities for education and career opportunities. In contrast to earlier times, they are significantly less likely to return to their hometowns after completing their education.

Attempts are being made to counteract the shortage of rural doctors through measures such as scholarships or financial incentives. In 2014, the German Council of Experts on the Development of the Healthcare System proposed increasing the remuneration for rural doctors by 50 percent and doubling the number of doctors training to become specialists in general medicine and internal medicine. Other approaches include the Rothenburg Model or the networking of practices. The delegation of tasks to medical assistants is also being discussed. Various approaches exist for this, such as the MoNI model in Lower Saxony r Verah (Practice Assistant in General Practice). In Lower Saxony, there was also a pilot project called the "mobile medical practice" to ensure a minimum level of medical care. Hesse also has a pilot project called the Medibus, which provides medical care to villagers as a "mobile medical practice.

At the end of 2012, the Federal Joint Committee increased the planned number of general practitioner positions in rural areas by 3,000. n return, 1,800 positions in oversupplied cities will be eliminated. Furthermore, measures are intended to make it more attractive to settle in rural areas, such as the elimination of residency requirements or the abolition of claims for reimbursement in cases of excessive prescriptions. The target is one practicing physician per 1,671 residents.

In some regions, particularly in the former East Germany, rural medical care was typically provided through so-called rural outpatient clinics. These were polyclinics with employed physicians, similar to medical care centres , which are gaining in importance.

== Situation in other countries ==
In Australia, the Royal Flying Doctor Service was established for sparsely populated regions. In Sweden , provincial parliaments in the north of the country maintain practices with small medical clinics (Sjukstuga). Similarly, some countries offer or have plans for additional training in "medicine in sparsely populated regions" (Rural Medicine).

== Filling a vacant medical practice ==
There are strict rules for filling vacant positions held by contracted physicians, designed to prevent the trading of licenses. Since 2013 following the death, relinquishment, or withdrawal of a contracted physician's license, the admissions committee decides whether a replacement procedure should even be carried out. Otherwise, the Association of Statutory Health Insurance Physicians (KV) must pay compensation to the contracted physician or their heirs. It is currently unclear whether the Associations of Statutory Health Insurance Physicians will exercise such a "right of first refusal." In the event of a replacement, the National Association of Statutory Health Insurance Physicians (KBV) must advertise the vacant position and compile a list of incoming applications. Applicants must practice at the previous location. Continuing the practice thus includes both a spatial and a personnel component. A branch practice operated at the previous location does not constitute continuation in this sense (Federal Social Court, judgment of March 20, 2013, case no.: B 6 KA 19/12). To facilitate replacement, the budgets can also be transferred to employed specialists, and such employment can now also be converted back into regular licenses.

The Central Institute for Statutory Health Insurance Physicians (Zi) believes that the planned acquisition of statistically surplus physician positions by the Association of Statutory Health Insurance Physicians (KV) threatens almost 9% of all practices. Even with an increase in the threshold for the level of care from the current 110% to 140%, as planned in the Statutory Health Insurance Strengthening Act (GKV-VSG), around 12,000 physician and psychotherapist positions would still be at risk. Of the physician and psychotherapist positions slated for closure, internists would be affected nationwide, accounting for approximately 37%, and around 19% of psychotherapists would also be unable to find successors. Regionally, the Bavaria KV would lead the way with 2,291 positions to be delisted, followed by the KVs of Baden-Württemberg (1,254) and North Rhine (1,440).

== Masterplan Medizinstudium 2020 ==
To address the shortage of general practitioners, the German Federal Government developed the "Master Plan for Medical Studies 2020." Medicine remains one of the most popular fields of study, measured by the number of applicants per place. For the current semester, 43,000 high school graduates applied, but the 35 universities in Germany offering medical studies were only able to fill approximately 9,100 places. Of the students who complete their studies and receive their medical license, on average only about ten percent choose to work as general practitioners.

== See also ==
- Medical desert
- Rural health
- Landarztquote
