= German acupuncture trials =

Study of acupuncture in healthcare

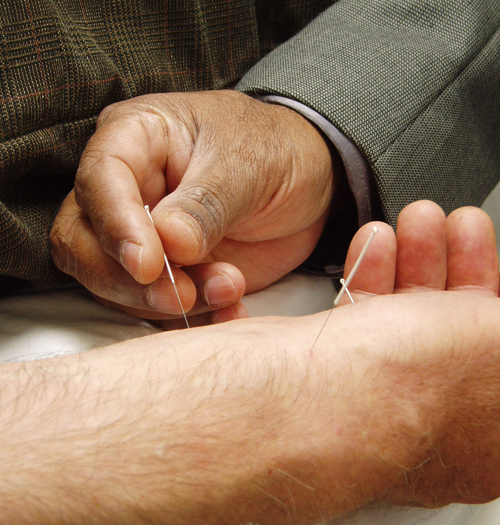
Needles being inserted into a patient's forearm

The German acupuncture trials (German: GERAC-Studien) were a series of nationwide acupuncture trials set up in 2001 and published in 2006 on behalf of several German statutory health insurance companies because of a dispute as to the usefulness of acupuncture. They consisted of one observational study on acupuncture side effects, and four randomized controlled trials (RCTs) investigating acupuncture treatment for low back pain, knee osteoarthritis, migraine prophylaxis, and tension-type headache. The trials are considered to be one of the largest clinical studies in the field of acupuncture.

As a result of the GERAC trials, the German Federal Joint Committee ruled in April 2006 that the costs of acupuncture treatment for chronic back pain and knee osteoarthritis would be covered by public health insurers in Germany, though no coverage was offered for headache or migraine. However, because of the outcome of these trials, in the case of the other conditions, insurance corporations in Germany were not convinced that acupuncture had adequate benefits over usual care or sham treatments. No significant differences between acupuncture and sham acupuncture were found in any trial.

According to Schweizer Fernsehen, the total cost of the trials amounted to 7.5 million Euros. Several years after the committee's decision to incorporate acupunctural treatment into the healthcare of Germany was passed into law, the number of regular users of acupuncture in the country surpassed one million.

== History ==
In the late 1990s, German healthcare regulators began to voice their doubts over the therapeutical usage of acupuncture, mostly because of the lack of reliable evidence regarding its therapeutic efficacy. This resulted in a heated debate, which led to Paul Rheinberger, Director of the Federal Committee of Physicians and Health Insurers, saying: "The higher the quality of clinical studies performed on acupuncture, the lesser the amount of evidence supporting its efficacy."

In October 2000, the Federal Committee of Physicians and Health Insurers decided that acupunctural treatment may not be reimbursed by statutory health insurance companies except within the framework of experimental field studies. In 2001 the GERAC were set up at Bochum University as a field study on behalf of six German statutory health insurance organizations.

== Overview and results ==
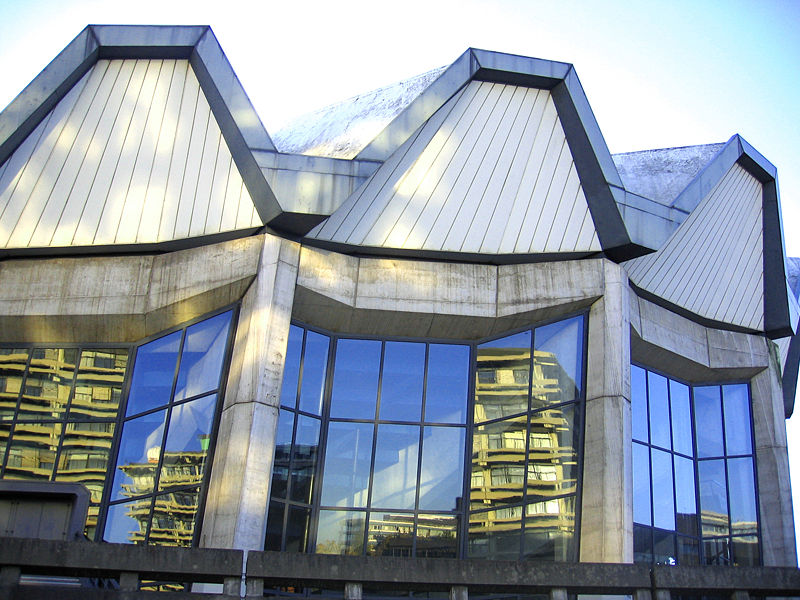
The Ruhr University Bochum

Beginning in 2001, the trials were carried out by Heidelberg University, the University of Marburg, the University of Mainz and the Ruhr University Bochum for low back pain, knee osteoarthritis, migraine prophylaxis, and tension-type headache. Apart from that, an observational study on adverse events of acupuncture was done.

The RCTs were designed as three-armed trials, with the three parallel groups in each trial receiving either verum (real) acupuncture treatment, sham acupuncture treatment, or guideline-based conventional treatment. The number of patients randomized was one of the largest ever for acupuncture trials. For each indication, around 1000 test subjects were included. The trials were conducted using sham acupuncture. No significant differences between acupuncture and sham acupuncture were found in any trial.

In 2005, the Deutsche Medizinische Wochenschrift (German Medical Weekly) published an article which criticized the trials for "not meeting scientific criteria". In 2006, Edzard Ernst, a professor of complementary medicine at the University of Exeter, noted that the studies had attracted criticism for not taking into account the risk of patient de-blinding, and that they "[failed] to conclusively answer the question whether acupuncture helps patients through a specific or a nonspecific effect". In September 2007, NHS Choices commented on the news surrounding the study and said that "this trial seems to support the role of acupuncture as an effective alternative therapy for chronic lower back pain" but that "it will be important to try to tease apart the real treatment effects from those that occur through the placebo effect". Highlighting the results of the placebo group, researchers refused to accept a placebo therapy as efficient.

== Domestic consequences ==
As a result of the GERAC trials, in April 2006 the German Federal Joint Committee, which sets health care reimbursement policy for Germany, determined that acupuncture for the treatment of low back pain and knee pain would be reimbursed by public health insurance but coverage was not offered for headache or migraine. In July 2006, the German Health Minister Ulla Schmidt confirmed the decision. However, because of the outcome of these trials, in the case of the other conditions, insurance corporations in Germany were not convinced that acupuncture had adequate benefits over usual care or sham treatments.

In 2012, health insurers reported that after the committee's decision to incorporate acupuncture into the healthcare of Germany was passed into law, the number of users of acupuncture in the country had increased by about 20%, finding favour especially among women; in 2012 there were around one million estimated users.

== Media reception ==
The trials resulted in increased coverage of acupuncture in the German media. According to the news broadcaster Deutschlandfunk, the GERAC trials were considered to be the world's largest set of clinical studies on acupuncture. An article in Die Welt said that the results of the studies were "promising". Der Spiegel said that the results of GERAC couldn't be brushed aside by the Federal Joint Committee.

ABC News reported that the study "highlights the superiority of acupuncture", but also introduces uncertainty about the specific mechanisms of treatment. Heinz Endres, one of the authors of the study, told the Canadian Broadcasting Corporation that "acupuncture has not yet been recommended as a routine therapy", but "we think this will change with our study". The BBC stated that the study "echoes the findings of two studies published last year in the British Medical Journal, which found a short course of acupuncture could benefit patients with low back pain". Nigel Hawkes, health editor of The Times, wrote that the trials "suggest that both acupuncture and sham acupuncture act as powerful versions of the placebo effect."

== See also ==
- British Doctors Study
- Heart Protection Study
- Scandinavian Simvastatin Survival Study
