= Patient recruitment =

Criterion-based inclusion of patients in research

Patient recruitment is the process of finding and enrolling suitable participants for clinical trials. It is a crucial aspect of drug development and medical research, as it affects the validity, reliability, and generalizability of the results. Patient recruitment can also be challenging, time-consuming, and costly, involving various ethical, regulatory, and logistical issues.

Many factors influence patient recruitment, such as the design and complexity of the trial, the availability and accessibility of the target population, the awareness and motivation of the potential participants, and the competition and collaboration among different stakeholders. To overcome these challenges, patient recruitment service providers offer various solutions, such as public education, patient outreach, site support, and data analytics. These services aim to increase the enrollment rate, reduce the dropout rate, and improve the quality and diversity of the trial participants.

== Patient recruitment in the US ==
Patient recruitment in the US includes a variety of services—typically performed by a Patient Recruitment Service Provider—to increase enrollment into clinical trials. Presently, the patient recruitment industry is claimed to total $19 billion per year.

Patient enrollment is the most time-consuming aspect of the clinical trial process. The leading cause of missed clinical trial deadlines is patient recruitment, taking up to 30 percent of the clinical timeline. Improving patient recruitment rates offers pharmaceutical and medical device companies opportunities to accelerate the pace of clinical trials – making it possible to reduce time to market. As the number of patients needed for clinical trials rises – as safety and regulatory issues drive trends toward larger and longer trials – the demand for patient recruitment services grows.

Clinical trials are conducted to collect data regarding the safety and efficacy of new drug and device development. They are conducted in a series of phases, each designed to address a separate purpose:

- Phase I: Researchers test a new drug or treatment in a small group of people (20–80) for the first time to evaluate its safety, determine a safe dosage range, and identify side effects.
- Phase II: The study drug or treatment is given to a larger group of people (100–300) to see if it is effective and to further evaluate its safety.
- Phase III: The study drug or treatment is given to large groups of people (1,000-3,000) to confirm its effectiveness, monitor side effects, compare it to commonly used treatments, and collect information that will allow the drug or treatment to be used safely.
- Phase IV: Post marketing studies delineate additional information including the drug's risks, benefits, and optimal use.

Pharmaceutical companies submit trial data to the U.S. Food and Drug Administration (FDA) as part of a New Drug Application, the application for FDA approval to market a drug in the U.S.

Patient recruitment service providers educate the public about the value of clinical trial participation and the measures in place to protect study participants. The 2001 "Will & Why Survey" of more than 5,000 people in the U.S. showed that 81 percent of the population was not aware of safeguards such as the Declaration of Helsinki, the Belmont Report, Institutional Review Boards, and the informed consent process. However, after learning about these protective measures, nearly 40 percent of respondents reported they would be more likely to participate in a clinical trial.

== Patient recruitment in Europe ==
In Europe, patient recruitment is the leading cause of missed clinical trial deadlines, taking up to 30%of the clinical timeline. Improving patient recruitment rates offers pharmaceutical and medical device companies one of the most significant opportunities to accelerate the pace of clinical trials and reduce time to market. Many factors hinder the enrollment and retention of patients in clinical trials in Europe: some of these factors include lack of awareness and trust, complex and restrictive eligibility criteria, practical and ethical barriers, and regulatory and organizational challenges. Different actors and stakeholders in the clinical research field, such as pharmaceutical companies and patient advocacy groups, have proposed and implemented various strategies and initiatives to address these challenges and improve patient recruitment in Europe. Some of these include increasing awareness and trust, simplifying and expanding eligibility criteria, reducing practical and ethical barriers, and harmonizing and streamlining regulatory and organizational processes.

== Origin ==
The discipline of patient recruitment was formed over three decades ago in the U.S. to meet the challenge of successful on-time enrollment. It has evolved into a field that includes feasibility modeling and analysis; country selection; site selection, training and support; metrics and evaluation; marketing communications, media; and public relations. The patient recruitment sector has experienced rapid growth in recent years, particularly in response to increasing number of global clinical trials.

Technology has impacted the evolution of patient recruitment. Many companies have developed proprietary software to help make processes more efficient, and providers increasingly rely on the Internet not only for advertising and early screening, but also for tasks such as tracking data and measuring site performance.

== Services ==
=== Patient recruitment ===
The goal of patient recruitment is to raise awareness of clinical trial opportunities and to encourage enrollment. Services are contracted for by pharmaceutical companies, biotechnology companies, medical device companies, contract research organizations (CROs), or a medical research site. Services include:

- Study feasibility: Evaluating whether the study may be performed in a given country and how effective it will be in enrolling patients.
- Population research: Discovering the motivational drivers of target patient populations is commonly gathered through focus groups, and may involve caregivers and physicians.
- Site selection: Choosing the optimal recruiting sites for study participation may play a role in the type of patients that are recruited. For example, in breast cancer survivors, evidence indicates that recruiting via letters or at the oncologist's office results in the recruitment of similar patients.
- Site assessment: Investigating the operational, management, technical, and clinical experience capabilities of participating sites helps decide what support they will need to successfully recruit patients for the study, improving forecasting and return on investment.
- Recruitment materials: Patient-directed communications designed to attract study referrals and raise enrollment. May include brochures, posters, letters, and flyers.
- Media support: Whether directed to patients and/or caregivers, advertising can raise study awareness and drive patient referral volume. Some patient recruitment providers possess in-house capabilities of developing, producing, and editing all content, while others rely on third-party vendors. Some popular media for patient recruitment advertising are: television, radio, newspaper, web (e.g., banner ads and word links), outdoor (e.g., bus stops), and social media (e.g., Twitter messages and YouTube videos).
- Media management: To exact the greatest value from media advertising, media buying services ensure placement in patient-rich geographic areas along with current market buying discounts and opportunities.
- Site training materials: Specially-designed instructional tools that assist site staff in introducing the study to patients, explaining study procedures to patients, and performing informed consent procedures with patients.
- Study Web site: Serving as an online hub for study information and sometimes pre-screening, the study website usually describes the study, provides disease-related resources, and allows patients to indicate their interest in study participation.
- Patient referral follow-up: When a site may be short of staff or overwhelmed by a spike in patient referrals, a PRO may offer administrative support by scheduling site appointments and following up with patients who may present enrollment challenges (e.g., a patient who recently moved and needs a closer site location).
- Translations: Providing cultural and regulatory-compliant translation of recruitment materials into various languages in accordance with country-specific requirements.
- Community outreach: To expand study awareness, outreach efforts may include participation at local health fairs or networking among community service groups, patient support groups, and other neighborhood organizations and institutions (e.g., churches and barbershops).
- Physician outreach: When study recruitment depends in large part on physician referrals, outreach measures can include forums where doctors, specialists, and healthcare providers gather to view a presentation on the study and how their patient pool may be eligible for participation. It may also include direct mail programs where collateral is sent to physicians with the aim of increasing referral volume.
- Site support: From resolving pre-trial operational issues to tailored support (e.g., referral processing, subject status updates, and protocol clarifications), site support ensures study challenges are immediately addressed.
- Monitoring and reporting: To assess the effects of the patient recruitment activities on enrollment, ongoing monitoring is performed. Assessing study metrics allows the sponsor to adjust recruitment efforts as needed to ensure maximum return on investment.

=== Patient retention ===
If a trial is lengthy or if it requires invasive procedures, the greater the need for retention support to help keep patients involved for the entire trial timeline. For those engaged in global clinical studies, particularly lengthy trials with extension studies, the need for patient retention services is significant. A variety of support services that are considered retention specific include:

- Visit reminders: To stem the possibility of missed appointments, visit alerts ensure compliance as they contribute to keeping the study top-of-mind. Reminders may take the form of post cards, e-mails, text messages, or phone calls.
- Patient support items: With particularly lengthy studies or where many invasive or extensive study procedures are involved, patient recognition items reflect appreciation for study participation and encourage retention (e.g., where lengthy infusions are repeatedly required in a study, a pillow or blanket may be given to a patient to prevent discomfort).
- Caregiver support: In some studies, the caregiver plays an integral role in ongoing patient participation, as in many Alzheimer's disease research trials. Recognizing the needs of the caregiver (e.g., study guides, modest food cards to compensate for lunchtime visits, coping skill resources, and home nurse visits) contributes to patient retention.

=== Current process ===
E6-GCP guidelines suggest that an investigator should have adequate resources to demonstrate (e.g., based on retrospective data) a potential for recruiting the required number of suitable subjects within the agreed recruitment period. There are many different recruitment methods, including mass media (i.e., television, radio and newspaper), physician referrals, press releases, fliers, random mailings, cold calls and the internet. These methods must be selected before study start. Also, some common factors such as-sample size, suitability of the strategy as per study design and overall budgetary constraints must not be ignored.

== Ethics ==
Forming a trusting relationship can be used as a method of increasing recruitment. Patients tend to trust their physician and are more inclined to consent to a study they recommend. However, it is not considered ethical to leverage trusting relationships due to the power gap between patients and physicians. It is similarly unethical for a physician to pressure a patient into joining a clinical trial.

When the research subject is unable to understand the difference between research and regular care, this is described as therapeutic misconception. It is also therapeutic misconception if a research subject overestimates the benefits of a trial or underestimates risks due to a misunderstanding of the research process. This brings up concerns about the validity of informed consent because therapeutic misconception hinders informed decision-making.

Avoiding bias is important when recruiting patients to maintain an ethical trial. Statistically, vulnerable populations, including women and ethnic minorities, are not as likely to be recruited to clinical trials. Patients who are part of ethnic minority groups often have reservations about joining trials because they fear discrimination, especially if there is a history of unethical experimentation involving their population. Confusion can arise due to language barriers, so communication must be in a manner that will be clearly understood.

=== Child recruitment ===
Different ethical concerns must be taken into consideration when recruiting children for clinical trials. Children are described as legally incompetent and are therefore unable to provide credible informed consent. The informed consent of one legal guardian is required to recruit children for clinical trials. In some cases, parents do not understand randomization, do not know they can withdraw their child from the study, do not know they can decline participation in a study, or want their physician to make the decision to participate. These misunderstandings make it questionable whether parental consent was informed. If children are over the age of 7, it is required that the child assent (agree) to participate in the research in addition to parent approval. When discussing research with a child, all aspects of the study must be communicated in a clear way that they can understand. Any written consent must be placed at an age-appropriate reading level.

== Globalization ==
As clinical trials begin to spread to developing countries, ethical concerns emerge regarding the validity of the informed consent process. When working with vulnerable populations, researchers must be sure to fully engage with potential patients and clearly explain the research to obtain valid informed consent. It is a legal requirement in some countries to obtain assent from children before they can participate in a study but this may be inappropriate if children do not normally have autonomy in those countries. There are ethical concerns about the power gap between patients and their physicians and how this could affect decision-making. A benefit of the globalization of clinical trials is that the recruitment process can be faster in some countries, making research more timely. Due to cultural differences, recruitment processes in one country may not be applicable in another and alterations should be made accordingly.
