= Gerald Gartlehner =

Gerald Gartlehner (born 30 March 1969, Steyr) is an Austrian physician, health scientist and clinical epidemiologist. Considered a pioneer in the field of evidence-based medicine in Austria, Gartlehner has dedicated much of his career to establishing and promoting the use of evidence syntheses to make sound clinical and health policy decisions. Gartlehner was ranked in the top 1% of highly cited researchers in 2020, 2021, 2022 and 2023.

== Biography ==
From 1987 to 1994, Gerald Gartlehner studied medicine at the University of Vienna. He then trained as a general physician in Vienna from 1995 to 2001.

From 2001 to 2002, Gartlehner studied public health at the University of North Carolina at Chapel Hill, USA and graduated with a Master of Public Health. Until 2007, he worked at the Sheps Center for Health Services Research at the University of North Carolina, specializing in evidence syntheses.

Since 2008, Gartlehner has been a professor of evidence-based medicine at the University for Continuing Education Krems, where he is the founder and director of the Department of Evidence-Based Medicine and Evaluation. In 2017, the department was named a WHO Collaborating Centre for Evidence-based Medicine. Since 2010 he has been the director of Cochrane Austria.

In 2011, Gartlehner qualified as a university lecturer for epidemiology at the Medical University of Vienna.

Since 2011, Gartlehner has been deputy director of RTI International - University of North Carolina Evidence-based Practice Center in the United States.

In 2017 and 2018 Gartlehner was a member of the Board of Trustees of Cochrane. Following the controversial expulsion of Peter Gotzsche from Cochrane in 2018, Gartlehner resigned from the Cochrane Board of Trustees, together with three other Board members.

Gartlehner has teaching appointments at the Sigmund Freud Private University, the Karl Landsteiner University of Health Sciences in Krems, Austria, and the Paris Descartes University in Paris, France.

Gerald Gartlehner has served and continues to serve on numerous scientific advisory boards and commissions worldwide, including the Institute for Quality and Efficiency in Health Care (IQWIG), Gesundheit Österreich GmbH, the Supreme Sanitary Council, and the Austrian Screening Committee.

In February 2020 the WHO tasked Gerald Gartlehner to head an emergency team for producing rapid summaries of evidence-based research studies regarding COVID-19.

== Publications ==
Publication list PubMed
