= Health technology assessment =

Field of policy analysis

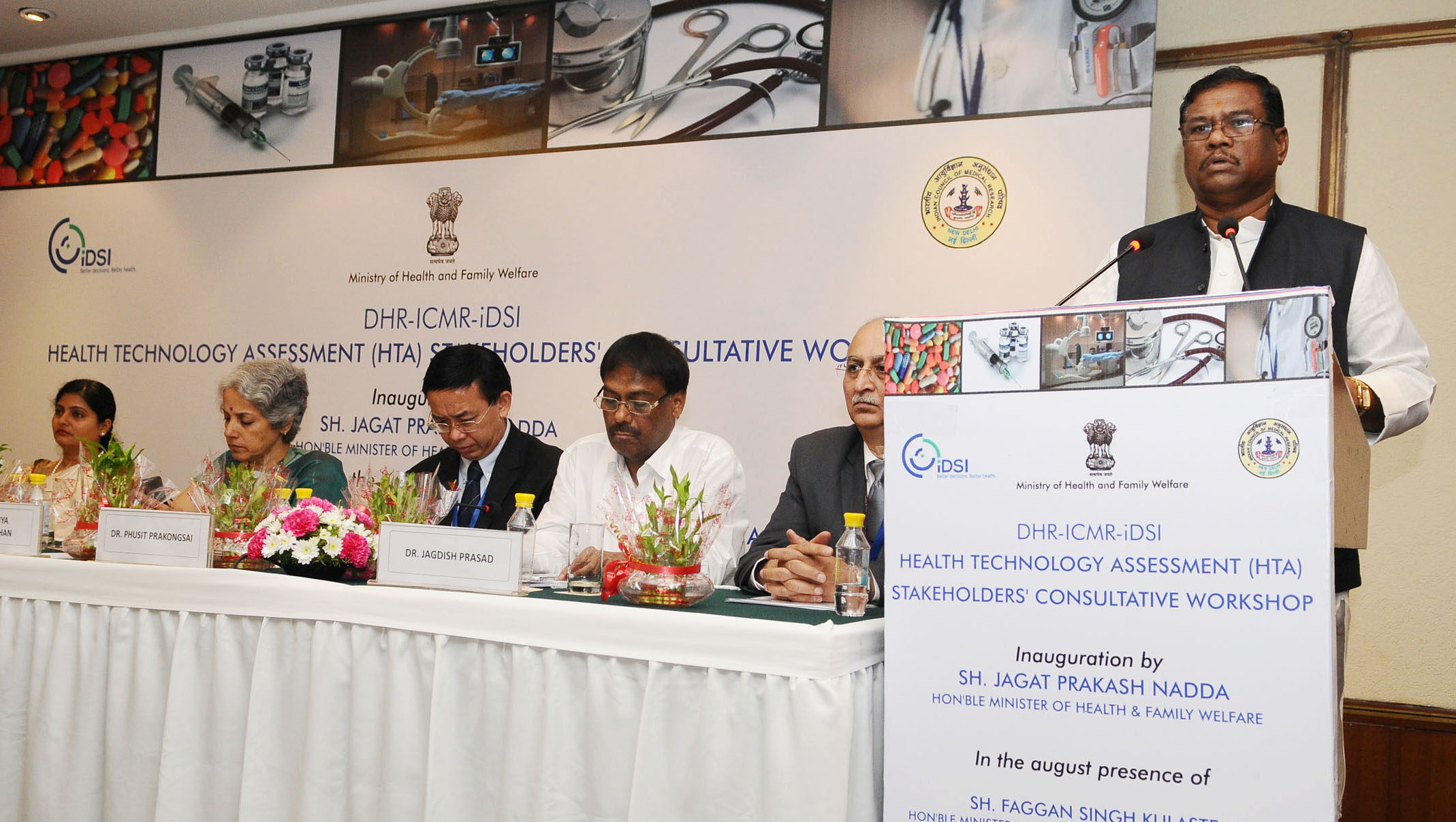
HTA conference and workshop

Health technology assessment (HTA) is a multidisciplinary process that uses systematic and explicit methods to evaluate the properties and effects of a health technology. Health technology is conceived as any intervention (test, device, medicine, vaccine, procedure, program) at any point in its lifecycle (pre-market, regulatory approval, post-market, disinvestment). The purpose of HTA is to inform "decision-making in order to promote an equitable, efficient, and high-quality health system". It has other definitions including "a method of evidence synthesis that considers evidence regarding clinical effectiveness, safety, cost-effectiveness and, when broadly applied, includes social, ethical, and legal aspects of the use of health technologies. The precise balance of these inputs depends on the purpose of each individual HTA. A major use of HTAs is in informing reimbursement and coverage decisions by insurers and national health systems, in which case HTAs should include benefit-harm assessment and economic evaluation." And "a multidisciplinary process that summarises information about the medical, social, economic and ethical issues related to the use of a health technology in a systematic, transparent, unbiased, robust manner. Its aim is to inform the formulation of safe, effective, health policies that are patient focused and seek to achieve best value. Despite its policy goals, HTA must always be firmly rooted in research and the scientific method".

== Purpose ==
Health technology assessment is intended to provide a bridge between the world of research and the world of decision-making. HTA is an active field internationally and has seen continued growth fostered by the need to support management, clinical, and policy decisions. It has also been advanced by the evolution of evaluative methods in the social and applied sciences, including clinical epidemiology and health economics. Health policy decisions are becoming increasingly important as the opportunity costs from making wrong decisions continue to grow. HTA is now also used in assessment of innovative medical technologies like telemedicine e.g. by use of the Model for assessment of telemedicine (MAST).

Health technology can be defined broadly as:

Any intervention that may be used to promote health, to prevent, diagnose or treat disease or for rehabilitation or long-term care. This includes the pharmaceuticals, devices, procedures and organizational systems used in health care.

== History ==
The discipline of HTA was first developed in the U.S. Office of Technology Assessment, which published its first report in 1976. The growth of HTA internationally can be seen in the expanding membership of the International Network of Agencies for Health Technology Assessment (INAHTA), a non-profit umbrella organization established in 1993. Organizations and individuals involved in the production of HTA publications may also affiliated with international societies such as Health Technology Assessment International (HTAi) and International Society for Pharmacoeconomics and Outcomes Research (ISPOR). Academic courses, typically in Masters programs, are also offered in health technology assessment and management.

== By country ==
The World Health Organization provides an overview of countries and their corresponding HTA agencies.

=== United Kingdom ===
The United Kingdom's National Institute for Health and Care Research (NIHR) runs several research programmes that may be viewed as falling into the realm of Health Technology Assessment. Of particular note is the NIHR Health Technology Assessment programme, its longest running, which undertakes both conventional HTA in the form of Evidence Synthesis and modelling, and evidence generation with a large portfolio of pragmatic RCTs and cohort studies. The programme's research is regularly published in NIHR's journal Health Technology Assessment.

Also in the UK, the Multidisciplinary Assessment of Technology Centre for Healthcare carries out HTA in collaboration with the health service, the NHS and various industrial partners. MATCH is organised into four themes addressing key HTA topics including Health Economics, Tools for Industry, User Needs and Procurement and Supply chain.

=== Canada ===
Canada also has a health technology assessment body called Canada's Drug Agency, formerly called the Canadian Agency for Drugs and Technologies in Health (CADTH).

=== Italy ===
As of today, 11 Italian regions have issued specific regional laws or regulations to manage HTA activities and processes at regional level: Abruzzo, Basilicata, Emilia-Romagna, Lazio, Liguria, Lombardia, Piemonte, Puglia, Sicilia, Toscana, and Veneto. In another four regions (Calabria, Marche, Umbria, and Valle D'Aosta) and in the two autonomous provinces of Bolzano and Trento, HTA is performed at different levels, even if no legislation has yet been produced.

=== Germany ===
In Germany, Health Technology Assessment is overseen by the Federal Joint Committee (Gemeinsamer Bundesausschuss, GBA), the highest decision-making body of the joint self-government of physicians, hospitals and health insurance funds.

The GBA decides on the benefits package of the statutory health insurance system. As part of this role, it conducts benefit assessments of new medical interventions. The Institute for Quality and Efficiency in Health Care (IQWiG) provides scientific evaluations and reports that inform the GBA's decisions.

=== Poland ===
The Agency for Health Technology Assessment and Tariff System (Polish: Agencja Oceny Technologii Medycznych i Taryfikacji, AOTMiT) is a government agency in Poland that carries out health technology assessment. The Agency was established in 2006. It is a member of EUnetHTA.

== Impact of HTA implementation ==
A recent study explored the implementation of HTA in three middle-income countries (MICs) and its influence on health system objectives. The study investigated the impact of HTA globally through a systematic literature review. The study also surveyed stakeholders from the middle-income countries.

The results indicated that the benefits of HTA implementation in these countries largely outweigh the drawbacks. The major advantages identified include enhanced transparency and accountability in healthcare decisions, leading to more informed and equitable healthcare policies.

The study has shown that HTA has a positive impact on several aspects of healthcare systems:

- Improved decision making: HTA aids in making better health financing decisions, including resource allocation and policy formulation.
- Enhanced transparency and accountability: The most evident benefit of HTA is its role in improving the clarity and responsibility of healthcare decisions.
- Economic impact: While HTA can generate cost savings in specific areas, its overall impact on the fiscal sustainability of healthcare systems in MICs remains unclear.

It was also noted that HTA's influence extends to the broader health system goals, such as health gain, equity in health, and responsiveness to patient needs. However, the impact on direct health gains and financial protection of households is less pronounced.

The study emphasizes the gradual adoption of HTA in MICs and the necessity for continuous assessment of its impact.

== See also ==
- Horizon scanning
- Pharmacoeconomics
