= British Acupuncture Council =

The British Acupuncture Council (BAcC) is a self-regulatory body for the practice of traditional acupuncture in the UK formed in June 1995 by the unification of five member acupuncture groups

== About ==
The British Acupuncture Councils (BAcC) main aim as a regulatory authority is to ensure the health and safety of the public by ensuring hight academic, hygiene and ethical standards are governed and therefore maintained by its members. In February 2013 the organisation became one of the first to appear on the Accredited Voluntary Register run by the Professional Standards Authority for Health and Social Care. The Council is UK's largest self-regulatory body for practitioners of traditional acupuncture, as it membership sits at around 3,000.

== History ==
The BAcC was formed in June 1995 by the unification of five member acupuncture groups of its precursor body, the Council For Acupuncture (CFA 1980-1995).

The five original groups were:

- The Chung San Acupuncture Society
- The British Acupuncture Association
- The Register of Traditional Chinese Medicine
- The International Register of Oriental Medicine
- The Traditional Acupuncture Society.

Upon the outcomes of this meeting, It was unanimously agreed by the CFA members that one body should represent and govern professionally qualified traditional acupuncturists in all aspects of their work. Since its inception the BAcC has sought to act as a voluntary self-regulator of its members.

The British Acupuncture Association and Register was founded in 1961 with the other four groups being founded between 1984 and 1986. The total membership number at the BAcC's inception in 1995 was approximately 1500 growing to 1757 by 1996, the first year of its existence.
