= Rural doctor quota =

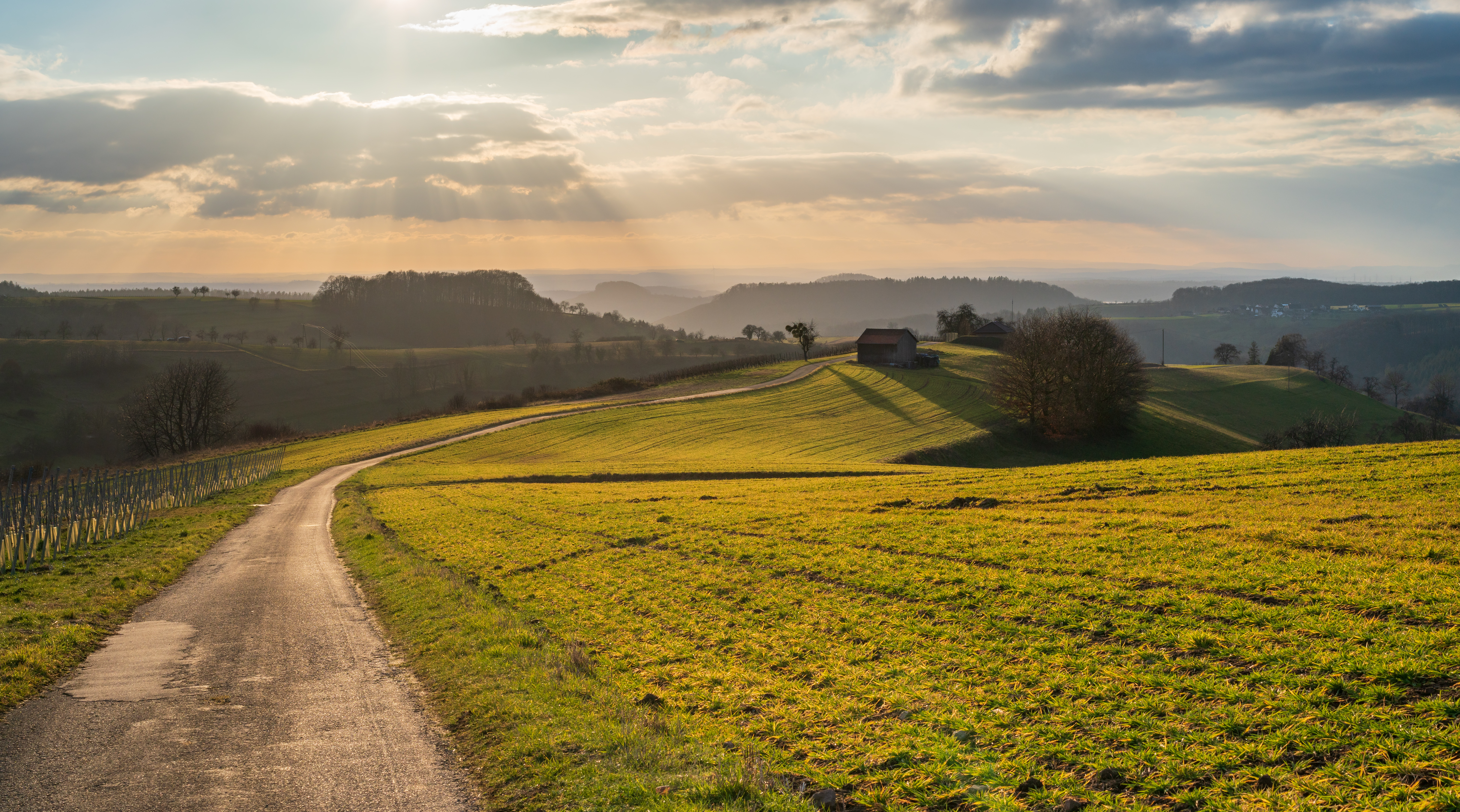
Doctor shortages are prevalent in the most rural parts of Germany

In Germany, the rural doctor quota (German: Landarztquote) is an instrument introduced by various German federal states to address the long-term shortage of general practitioners and specialists in rural areas (Landarzt). Each year, a certain percentage of medical school places are allocated, exempt from the general admission restrictions for medical studies, with the contractual obligation to establish a practice as a general practitioner or specialist in the rural area of the respective federal state after successfully completing their studies. This obligation can only be waived later by paying a substantial, contractually agreed-upon fee, which is roughly equivalent to the cost of the training.

== Background ==
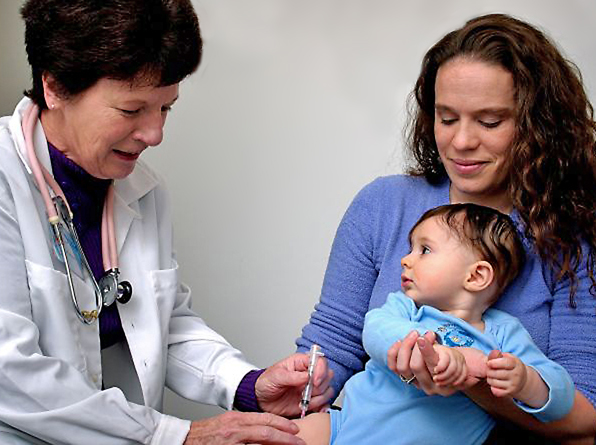
During a doctor's consultation (vaccination of a toddler)

Medical care in Germany is good by international standards, but varies considerably from region to region. While the image of the rural doctor is romantically idealized in novels and films, doctors, especially in rural areas, often find no successors after retiring. Young doctors prefer to open practices in larger cities or take positions in hospitals in urban environments. The National Association of Statutory Health Insurance Physicians (KBV) predicts that by 2030 "the demand for medical care will increase moderately, while the supply of doctors will decrease. General practitioners and specialist primary care providers will be particularly affected." In addition to other measures, such as sometimes substantial government subsidies for setting up a medical practice, the rural doctor quota is intended to improve medical care in areas with a shortage of doctors (which are not exclusively, but primarily, rural regions). However, due to the length of training, this instrument only begins to take effect after a delay of eight to ten years. North Rhine-Westphalia was the first German state to introduce such a quota for rural doctors, which was decided in December 2018 and came into effect in the winter semester of 2019/20. A total of 11 German states have since introduced such a regulation.

== Rural doctor quotas in German states ==
=== Bavaria ===
In Bavaria, the rural doctor quota is regulated in the Bavarian Rural and Public Health Physician Act (BayLArztG) of 23 December 2019. According to this act, up to 8 percent of all medical school places available annually at Bavarian faculties are allocated to applicants for rural doctor positions, and 1.8 percent to applicants for the public health service. The contractual penalty is €250,000.

=== Baden-Württemberg ===
In Baden-Württemberg, legal basis for the rural doctor quota is the Law on Supporting the Provision of Primary Care in Areas of Public Need in Baden-Württemberg (Baden-Württemberg Rural Physician Act) of 4 February 2021. According to this law, starting in the winter semester of 2021/22, 75 medical school places will be allocated annually according to the rural physician quota. The contractual penalty is €250,000.

=== Hesse ===
Starting in the winter semester of 2023/24, approximately 8 percent of medical school places in Hesse were to be allocated to applicants who commit in advance to working as a rural doctor or in the public health service. This is regulated in the Law on Safeguarding Primary Care and the Public Health Service in Hesse (GHVÖG) of 3 February 2022.

=== North Rhine-Westphalia ===
With the Act on Ensuring Primary Care in Areas of Special Public Need in the State of North Rhine-Westphalia (North Rhine-Westphalia Rural Physician Act – LAG NRW) of 18 December 2018, North Rhine-Westphalia became the first German state to introduce a rural physician quota. Approximately 8 percent of medical school places are allocated in this way; in the first year of its application, this amounted to 364 places.

=== Mecklenburg-Vorpommern ===
The Mecklenburg-Vorpommern Law on Ensuring Primary Care in Areas of Special Public Need (Mecklenburg-Vorpommern Rural Physician Law – LAG MV) of 3 February 2020, established a rural physician quota. Starting in the winter semester of 2021/22, the rural physician quota applied to admissions at the University of Greifswald and the University of Rostock. The penalty for non-compliance is €250,000.

=== Lower Saxony ===
Starting in the winter semester of 2023/24, at least 60 study places would be allocated to applicants who conclude a contract in accordance with the rural doctor quota in Lower Saxony. This is based on the regulation on the transfer of state tasks to the chambers for the health professions of 8 December 2000, as amended in 2022.

=== Rhineland-Palatinate ===
The basis for the rural doctor quota is the Rhineland-Palatinate State Law on Ensuring Primary Care in Rural Regions of 26 September 2019. According to this law, of the 430 medical school places in Rhineland-Palatinate, 7.8 percent are to be allocated through a procedure outside the numerus clausus, specifically 6.5 percent with a rural doctor obligation and 1.5 percent with a contractual commitment to the public health service. The contractual penalty is €250,000.

=== Saarland ===
The Act on Ensuring Primary Care in Areas of Special Public Need in Saarland of 13 May 2020 regulates the rural doctor quota. Starting in the winter semester of 2020/2021, up to 7.8 percent of the medical school places at Saarland University will be allocated on this basis. The penalty for non-compliance is €250,000.

=== Sachsen ===
The Act on Ensuring Medical Care in Rural and Other Areas of Need in the Free State of Saxony (Saxon Rural Physician Act – SächsLArztG) of 30 September 2021 applies in Saarland. From the winter semester 2022/23, 6.5 percent of the study places (40 places) at the Universities of Leipzig and Dresden are available for this purpose. The contractual penalty is 250,000 euros.

=== Saxony-Anhalt ===
The rural physician quota is regulated here by the Act on Ensuring Primary and Public Health Care in Areas of Special Public Need in the State of Saxony-Anhalt (Rural and Public Health Physician Act Saxony-Anhalt – LAAG LSA) of 29 October 2019. Here, 5 percent of the medical school places in Halle (Saale) and Magdeburg are allocated according to a special procedure.

=== Thuringia ===
Starting in the winter semester of 2024/25, 10 percent of the current 300 annual medical school places at Friedrich Schiller University Jena are to be allocated as a rural doctor quota. The penalty for non-compliance is €250,000.

== Reactions from the industry ==
The Hartmannbund, a German medical association, is skeptical of the rural doctor quota. In a 2019 press release, the Hartmannbund quotes its North Rhine-Westphalia chairwoman, Anke Lesinski-Schiedat: “We cannot seriously want to tie high school graduates to an economically and culturally disadvantaged region until they are forty years old.” The decision to specialize in a particular field is usually made only towards the end of medical school and sometimes even during residency. Johannes Stalter (Medical Faculty of Oldenburg) is quoted as saying: “In addition, starting a family falls within the age range of 20 to 40 – precisely the window of commitment – which would be strongly influenced by personal ties”.

In contrast, the Associations of Statutory Health Insurance Physicians (Kassenärztlichen Vereinigungen) generally welcome the rural doctor quota. "It is another building block to address the shortage of general practitioners in Lower Saxony", the Association of Statutory Health Insurance Physicians of Lower Saxony stated, "However, this quota is not a panacea".

== See also ==
- Landarzt
