= ISO 14155 =

Standard for assessing clinical practices

ISO 14155 Clinical investigation of medical devices for human subjects -- Good clinical practice

This international standard addresses good clinical practices for the design, conduct, recording and reporting of clinical investigations carried out in human subjects to assess the safety and performance of medical devices for regulatory purposes. However, it does not apply to in vitro diagnostic medical devices.

This standard was developed by ISO technical committee ISO/TC 194. ISO 14155 was published in its second edition in February 2011. The third edition was released in July 2020.

== Edition and revision ==
The first edition of ISO 14155-1 was published on 15 February 2003. The second revision of the standard was released in February 2011, the third revision and therefore current version of the standard was released in July 2020, ISO 14155:2020.

== Main requirements of the standard ==
The ISO 14155 adopts the structure in the following breakdown:

1. Scope
2. Normative references
3. Terms and definitions
4. Ethical considerations
5. Clinical investigation planning
6. Clinical investigation conduct
7. Suspension, termination and close-out of the clinical investigation
8. Responsibilities of the sponsor
9. Responsibilities of the principal investigator

== Assessment ==
The standard ISO 14155:2011 is an assessable standard and hence is certifiable. The standard regards good clinical practices and protocols for the clinical investigations and plans of medical devices. The assessment is carried out following defined protocols in this international standard.

== Certification ==
Independent assessment bodies carry out independent assessments following auditing principles and practices and protocols in this International Standard.

== History ==
Year	Description
2003	ISO 14155-1 (1st Edition)
2011	ISO 14155 (2nd Edition)
2020	ISO 14155 (3rd Edition)

== See also ==
- Good clinical practice
- International Organization for Standardization
- List of International Organization for Standardization standards
- Nuremberg Code
