= Institute for Quality and Efficiency in Health Care =

German agency

- Institut für Qualität und Wirtschaftlichkeit im Gesundheitswesen (IQWiG)

Agency overview
- Formed: 2004
- Jurisdiction: Germany
- Headquarters: Cologne, Germany
- Agency executives: Thomas Kaiser, Head of Institute; Michaela Eikermann, Deputy Head of Institute
- Parent department: Federal Ministry of Health
- Website: iqwig.de

The Institute for Quality and Efficiency in Health Care (IQWiG) (German: Institut für Qualität und Wirtschaftlichkeit im Gesundheitswesen) is a German agency responsible for assessing the quality and efficiency of medical treatments, including drugs, non-drug interventions (e.g. surgical procedures), diagnostic and screening methods, and treatment and disease management. IQWiG also supplies health information to patients and the general public.

The organization is independent of the pharmaceutical industry, contracted solely by the Federal Ministry of Health and the Joint Federal Committee.

== Statuory basis ==
IQWiG operates on a legal basis laid down in §139a and §139b of the Fifth Book of the German Social Code (SGB V) that summarises almost all provisions on statutory health insurance in Germany.

== History ==
IQWiG was founded in 2004 under the directorship of Dr Peter Sawicki, who was replaced in September 2010 by Dr Jürgen Windeler. Windeler retired from the position in 2023, succeeded in the post by Dr Thomas Kaiser. Its deputy director is Dr Stefan Lange.

== Structure ==
The governing body of the Institute is the Foundation for Quality and Efficiency in Health Care. Its purpose is to promote science and research. The bodies of the foundation are the Foundation Council and the Board of Directors. The Board of Trustees and the Scientific Advisory Board act in an advisory capacity to the Institute.

IQWiG is divided into the following departments, which publish reports:

- Drug Assessment
- Non-Drug Interventions
- Medical Biometry
- Health Care and Health Economics

Additionally, the Health Information Department produces evidence-based health information in plain language that is published on the website informedhealth.org, in German and in English.

These five departments are supported by the Administration and Information Management departments as well as Communications, International Affairs, Quality Assurance and Legal units.

== International Cooperation ==
IQWiG regularly communicates with similar organisations in other countries, such as with the National Institute for Health and Clinical Excellence (NICE) in the UK and the Haute Autorité de Santé (HAS) in France. It is a member of the International Network of Agencies for Health Technology Assessment (INAHTA) and takes part in the European Network for Health Technology Assessment (EUnetHTA).

== Most noticed reports ==
IQWiG hit international headlines in October 2010 with a report slamming Reboxetine as inefficient and harmful.

Similarly, in September 2010, another study rebuffed the use of Venlafaxine and Duloxetine as first-line treatment in major depression, but recommend them as a second line option.

The use of Memantine in Alzheimer's patients was deemed as insufficiently supported by scientific evidence. This led Merz Pharma to provide additional data, and the Institute to change its evaluation.

A report in 2010 indicated that long-acting insulin analogues showed no benefits over intermediate-acting insulin for the treatment of type I diabetes.

== See also ==
- AMNOG
