= Federal Joint Committee (Germany) =

German healthcare decision-making body

- Gemeinsamer Bundesausschuss (GBA)

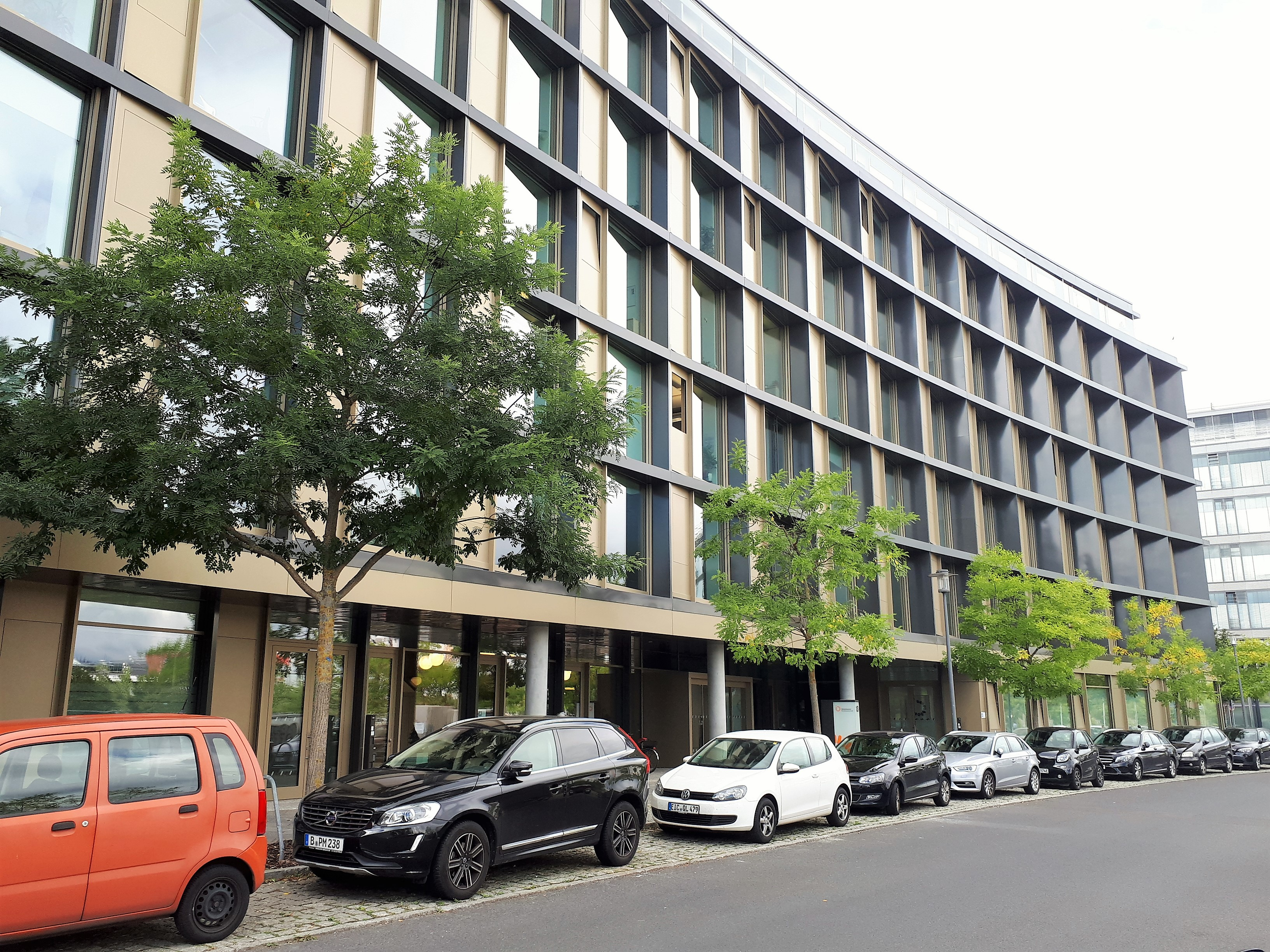
- Headquarters of the GBA in Berlin
- Abbreviation: GBA
- Formation: January 1, 2004; 22 years ago
- Headquarters: Berlin, Germany
- Region served: Germany
- Official language: German
- Chair: Sonja Optendrenk
- Website: g-ba.de/english/

The Federal Joint Committee (German: Gemeinsamer Bundesausschuss; GBA) is the central decision-making body of the self-governing health care system in Germany. Established in 2004 through the merger of several public health agencies, it operates under an independent chairman and a permanent staff.

The GBA is authorized to issue binding regulations based on health reform legislation, along with routine decisions regarding healthcare in Germany. While it is not a subordinate agency and remains independent of the Ministry of Health, the ministry is responsible for legal supervision and reserves the right to review decisions for final approval or modification. As a supreme decision-making body, the committee exerts a direct influence on the healthcare provisions for approximately 73 million people covered by statutory health insurance.

== History ==
The Federal Joint Committee (GBA) was formed in 2004 by the merger of the following organizations

- Bundesausschuss der Ärzte und Krankenkassen (Federal committee of Physicians and Health Insurers)
- Bundesausschuss der Zahnärzte und Krankenkassen(Federal committee of Dentists and Health Insurers)
- Koordinierungsausschuss (Federal coordination committee)
- Ausschuss Krankenhaus (Hospital committee)

These organizations had been created several decades ago to ensure supervision of the professional relationship between doctors and health insurers. Their roots can be partially traced back to the Weimar Republic in the late-1910s and 1920s. In 2004, they were renamed and merged into the Federal Joint Committee (GBA) as follows:

- Kassenärztliche Bundesvereinigung und Kassenzahnärztliche Bundesvereinigung (National Associations of Statutory Health Insurance Physicians and Dentists)
- Deutsche Krankenhausgesellschaft (German Hospital Federation)
- GKV-Spitzenverband (Central Federal Association of Health Insurance Funds)

As a supreme decision-making body, the Joint Committee exerts a direct influence on the healthcare provisions for millions of people.

== Decision-making process ==
The GBA is authorized to issue binding regulations based on health reform legislation, along with routine decisions regarding healthcare in Germany. While it is not a subordinate agency and remains independent of the Ministry of Health, the ministry is responsible for legal supervision and reserves the right to review all resolutions and guidelines for final approval or modification.

In the early stages of the committee's decision-making process, assessment reports on diagnostic or therapeutic interventions are prepared by the Institute for Quality and Efficiency in Health Care (IQWiG) on its behalf. As the supreme decision-making body of the self-governing system—comprising representatives of physicians, dentists, hospitals, sickness funds, and patients—the GBA determines the benefit package of the statutory health insurance. These directives are legally binding for providers, payers, and approximately 70 million insured persons.

== Notable guidelines ==
Following the German acupuncture trials from 2002 to 2006, the Committee decided to include acupuncture into the catalogue of services covered by statutory health insurance organizations for the treatment of low back pain and knee pain.

On June 17, 2010, the Committee removed the usage of glinides from general prescription guidelines for the reduction of human glucose levels. It justified its decision by referring to the conclusion of the Institute for Quality and Efficiency in Health Care that proof of efficacy was lacking.

In 2013, the Committee issued a preliminary decision ruling that a fixed dose combination of Stribild does not offer a benefit over Atripla for HIV treatment.

== See also ==
- German Medical Association
