= European Network for Health Technology Assessment =

European Network for Health Technology Assessment (EUnetHTA) is a network, established to create an effective and sustainable structure for health technology assessment (HTA) across Europe that could develop and implement practical tools to provide reliable, timely, transparent and transferable information to contribute to HTAs in Member States.

The overall strategic objective of the network is to connect public national/regional HTA agencies, research institutions and health ministries, enabling an effective exchange of information and support to policy decisions by the Member States.

EUnetHTA consists of a total of 83 organisations from 27 EU member states plus Norway, Switzerland, Ukraine, and the UK. As part of the EUnetHTA governance structure, an annual Forum has been formed to ensure a transparent engagement with a broad range of stakeholders: representatives from patient and healthcare consumer organisations, healthcare providers, payers (statutory health insurance) and the industry.

The EUnetHTA Joint Action 2 (2012–2015) continued the activities of Joint Action 1 (2010–2012) on October 1, 2012, and developed a general strategy, principles and an implementation proposal for a sustainable European HTA collaboration according to the requirements of Article 15 of the Directive for cross-border healthcare. EUnetHTA Joint Action 3 (2016-2021) increased the use, quality and efficiency of joint HTA work at the European level. EUnetHTA 21 (2021-2023) work will build on the achievements and lessons learned from the EUnetHTA Joint Actions and focus on supporting a future EU HTA system under the HTA Regulation.

EUnetHTA supports evidence-based, sustainable, and equitable choices in healthcare and health technologies and supports re-use in regional and national HTA reports and activities.

To develop a voluntary, sustainable European Collaboration on HTA, the model focusses on supporting Members States in receiving HTA-relevant information that is objective, reliable, timely, and comparable.
