= Engelbert Kaempfer =

German botanist (1651–1716)

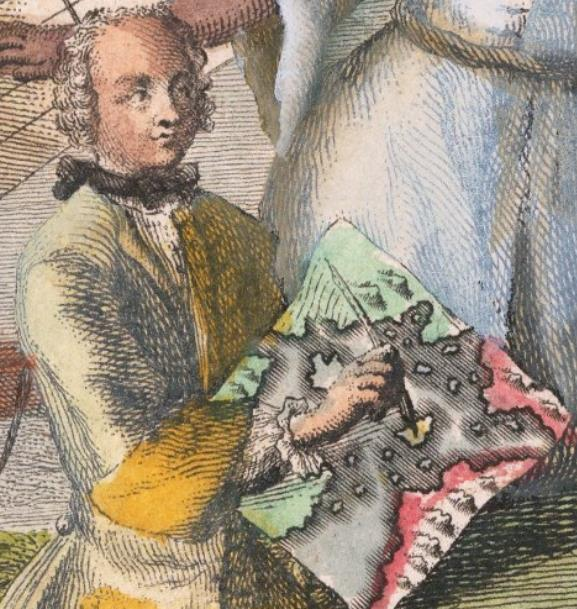
- Kaempfer depicted in the cartouche of a map of Japan by Matthäus Seutter based on his observations, c. 1730
- Born: Engelbert Kaempfer; 16 September 1651; Lemgo, Lippe, Holy Roman Empire
- Died: 2 November 1716 (aged 65); Lemgo
- Other name: Engelbertus Kaempferus
- Occupations: Naturalist, physician, explorer, writer
- Notable work: Flora Japonica, History of Japan

Engelbert Kaempfer (16 September 1651 – 2 November 1716) was a German naturalist, physician, explorer, and writer known for his tour of Russia, Persia, India, Siam and Japan between 1683 and 1693.

He wrote two books about his travels. Amoenitatum exoticarum, published in 1712, is important for its medical observations and the first extensive description of Japanese plants (Flora Japonica). His History of Japan, published posthumously in 1727, was the chief source of Western knowledge about the country throughout the 18th and mid-19th centuries, when it was closed to foreigners.

== Early life ==
Kaempfer was born at Lemgo in the Principality of Lippe, within the Holy Roman Empire. His father was a pastor and his mother helped support the congregation. He studied at Hameln, Lüneburg, Hamburg, Lübeck and Danzig (Gdańsk), and after graduating at Kraków, spent four years at Königsberg in Prussia, studying medicine and natural science.

== Travels and studies ==
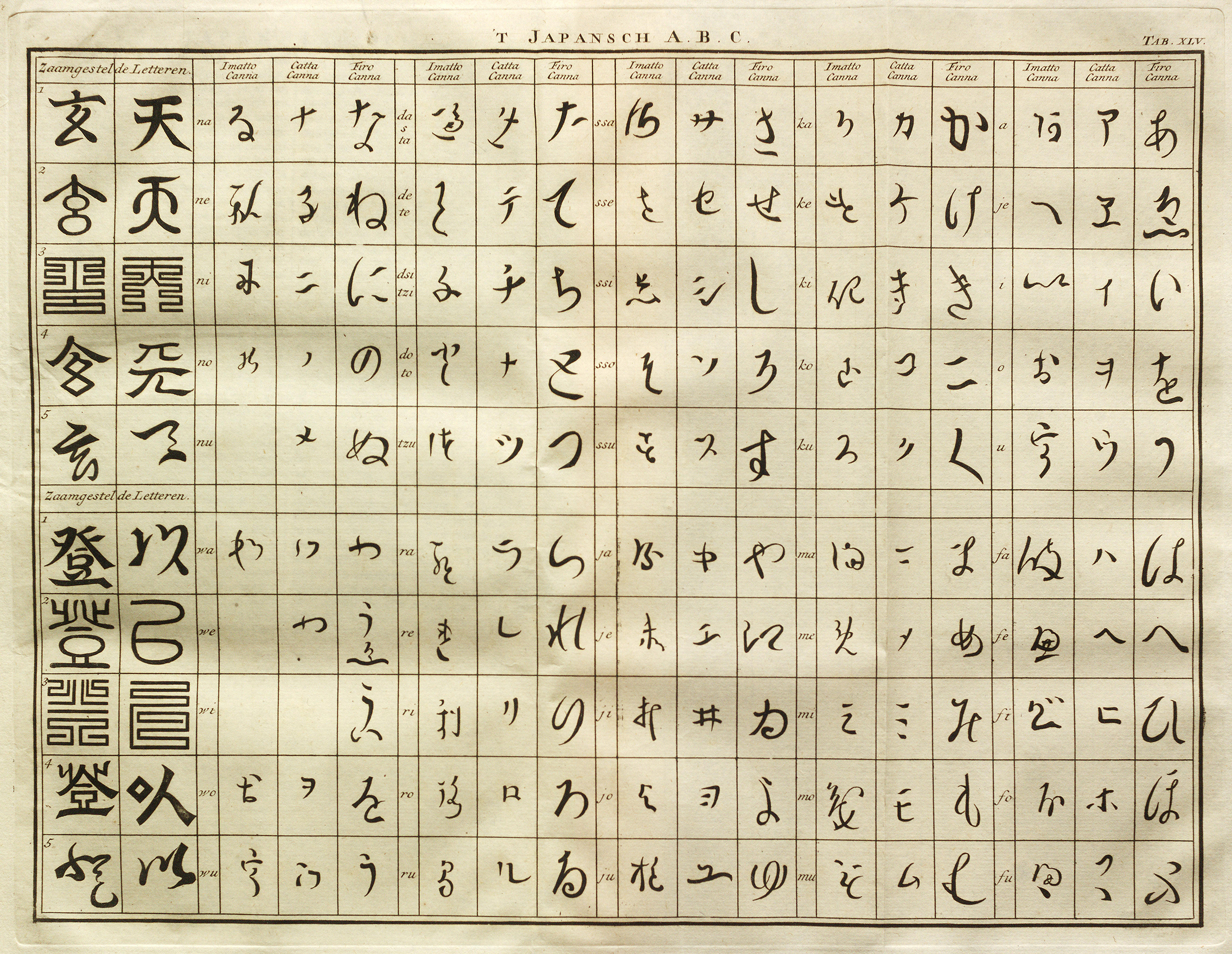
"Japanese alphabet" (Engelbert Kaempfer: "De Beschryving van Japan", 1729). The column Imatto Canna is a misinterpretation by Kaempfer.

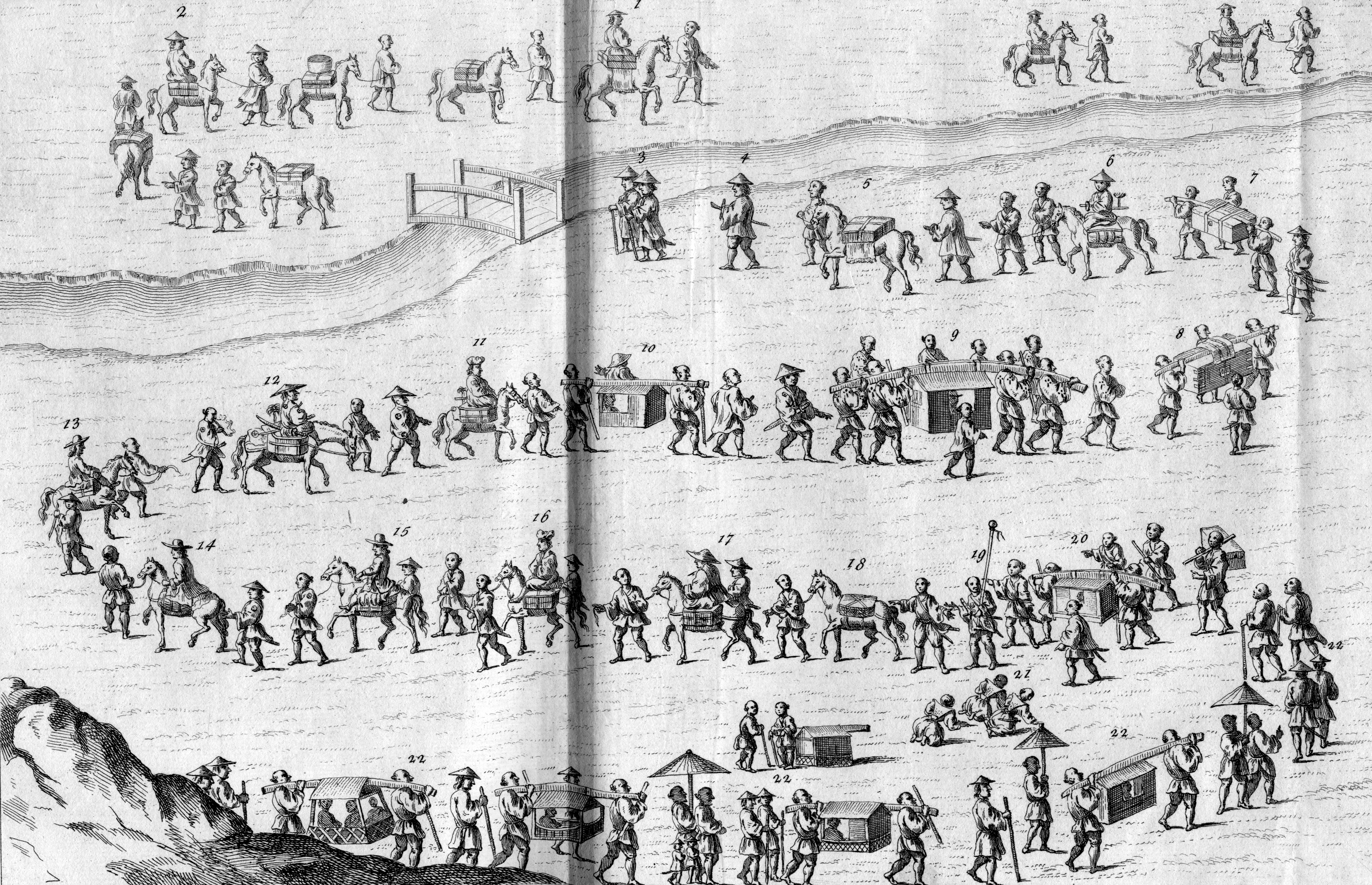
Court Journey to the shōgun of Japan in 1691 (Engelbert Kaempfer: "De Beschryving van Japan", 1729)

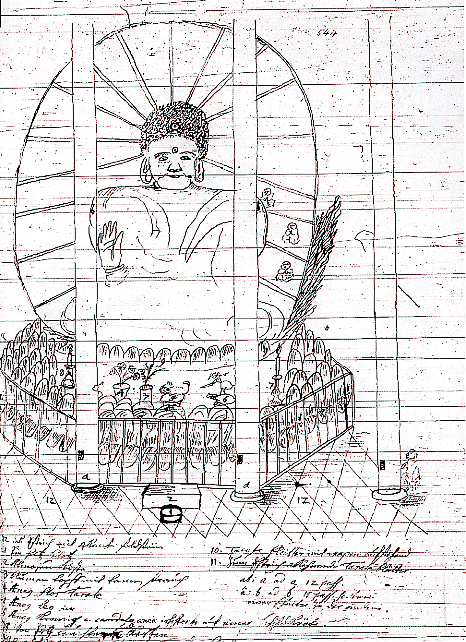
Kaempfer's sketch of Kyoto Daibutsu

=== Persia ===
In 1681, Kaempfer visited Uppsala in Sweden, where he was offered inducements to settle. His desire for foreign travel led him to become secretary to the second embassy of the Swedish ambassador Ludvig Fabritius, whom Charles XI sent through Russia to Persia in 1683. Kaempfer's travelogue of this embassy was later published. He reached Persia by way of Moscow, Kazan and Astrakhan, landing at Nizabad "in Shirvan" (now in Azerbaijan) after a voyage in the Caspian Sea. From Shemakha in Shirvan, he made an expedition to the Baku peninsula, being perhaps the first modern scientist to visit the "fields of eternal fire" around Baku. In 1684 Kaempfer reached Isfahan, then the Persian capital.

When after a stay of more than a year the Swedish embassy prepared to return to its homeland, Kaempfer joined the fleet of the Dutch East India Company (VOC) in the Persian Gulf as chief surgeon. In spite of fever caught at Bandar Abbas, he saw something of Arabia (visiting Muscat in 1688) and many of the western coastlands of India.

=== Siam and Japan ===
In September 1689, Kaempfer reached Batavia. He spent the following winter studying Javanese natural history. In May 1690 he set out for Japan as physician to the VOC trading post in Nagasaki. En route to Japan, the ship in which he sailed touched at Siam, whose capital Ayutthaya he visited. He recorded his meeting with Kosa Pan, the Siamese Minister and former ambassador to France. In September 1690 Kaempfer arrived in Nagasaki, the only Japanese port then open to Dutch and Chinese ships.

Kaempfer stayed two years in Japan, during which time he twice visited Edo and the shōgun Tokugawa Tsunayoshi. He conducted extensive studies on local plants, many of which were published in his "Flora Japonica" (part of Amoenitatum Exoticarum). When he visited Buddhist monks in Nagasaki in February 1691, he was the first western scholar to describe the tree Ginkgo biloba. He brought some Ginkgo seeds back that were planted in the botanical garden in Utrecht. The trees have survived to the 21st century. (The curious "–kgo" spelling has long been considered to be an error Kaempfer made in his notes, but Nagata et al. showed that it was the spelling of his interpreter, Genemon Imamura, who spoke the dialect of Nagasaki.

Kaempfer also collected materials and information on Japanese acupuncture and moxibustion. His treatise on the cure of colic (Japanese senki) using needles and his presentation of a Japanese "Moxa-mirror" had a considerable influence on the reception of Far Eastern medicine in 18th-century Europe.

In his posthumously published notes on Japan, he mixes careful observation with a strong desire to make these observations conform to European conceptions of Asia. He argues that the Japanese have a separate ethnic origin from the Chinese and claims they descend directly from the builders of the Tower of Babel. Thus he links Shinto to Babylonian religion. At the same time, he was among the first Europeans to claim that Japan had a diversity of religions rather than one religion that corresponded to ethno-national identity.

During his stay in Japan, Kaempfer's tact, diplomacy, and medical skill overcame the cultural reserve of the Japanese. He elicited much valuable information. In November 1692 he left Japan for Java.

=== Return to Europe ===
After twelve years abroad, Kaempfer returned to Europe in 1695, landing at Amsterdam. He was awarded a doctorate in medicine at the University of Leiden in the Netherlands. Kaempfer settled in his native city of Lemgo, where he became the physician of the Count of Lippe. In Germany he published the book Amoenitatum exoticarum (Lemgo 1712). Among many other Japanese plants, it included an illustration of a camellia and introduced 23 varieties. It was notable for its description of the electric eel, acupuncture, moxibustion, and the hyena. This was the first scientific description of the hyena (about which until then only confused and downright fanciful things had been "reported" since antiquity), and Linnaeus used it extensively. It can be argued that the modern zoological name of the striped hyena, Hyaena hyaena Linnaeus, could or should include the name Kaempfer based on the tradition of taxonomic naming based on who described something first. Kaempfer's other work was also often praised by Linnaeus, including his systematic description of tea, as well as his other work on Japanese plants, and Linnaeus adopted some of Kaempfer's plant names, such as Ginkgo.

In 1716, Kaempfer died at Lemgo. Most of his manuscripts and many objects from his collection are preserved in the British Library and the British Museum. Kaempfer's works on Japan had a profound influence on European and German research on East Asia, which culminated in the studies by Philipp Franz von Siebold.

== Manuscripts ==
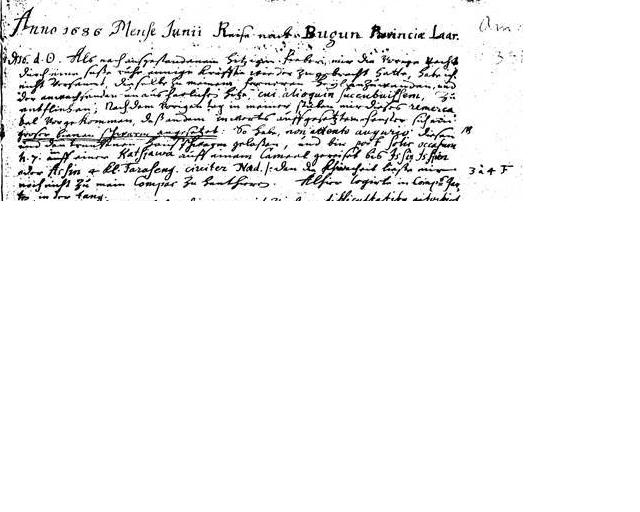
Manuscript from Engelbert Kaempfer, British Library, Sloane MS 2912

At Kaempfer's death his mostly unpublished manuscripts were purchased by Sir Hans Sloane via George I's court physician Johann Georg Steigerthal and conveyed to England. Among them was a History of Japan, translated from the manuscript into English by Sloane's librarian John Gaspar Scheuchzer (1702–1729). It was first published in London, in 2 vols., in 1727. The original German (Heutiges Japan, Japan of Today) had not been published; the extant German version was translated from the English. Besides Japanese history, this book contains a description of the political, social and physical state of the country in the 17th century. For upwards of a hundred years, when Japan was closed to foreigners, it was the chief source of information for the general reader. In the 21st century it is considered to have some value. A life of the author is prefixed to the History. Kaempfer's original manuscripts are held by the British Library.

Most have been published since 2001: Engelbert Kaempfer, Werke. Kritische Ausgabe in Einzelbänden. Herausgegeben von Detlef Haberland, Wolfgang Michel, Elisabeth Gössmann.

- Vol 1/1 Engelbert Kaempfer: Heutiges Japan. Herausgegeben von Wolfgang Michel und Barend J. Terwiel. 2001.[xiv, 779 pp., 93 ills. Transliteration of EKs manuscript, British Library London, Ms Sl 3060, reproduction of drawings, index]
- Vol 1/2 Engelbert Kaempfer: Heutiges Japan. Herausgegeben von Wolfgang Michel und Barend J. Terwiel. 2001 [vii, 828 pp., 56 ills.] [Extensive commentary by Michel on Kaempfer's manuscript and drawings, Japanese and Western coworkers, Kaempfer's research context, his Japanese collection etc. including a bibliography] ISBN 3-89129-931-1
- Vol 2 Briefe 1683–1715. München: Iudicium Verl., 2001. ISBN 3-89129-932-X ["Letters 1683–1715"]
- Vol 3 Zeichnungen japanischer Pflanzen. München: Iudicum Verl., 2003. ISBN 3-89129-933-8 ["Drawings of Japanese plants"]
- Vol 4 Engelbert Kaempfer in Siam. München: Iudicum Verl., 2003. – ISBN 3-89129-934-6 ["Kaempfer in Siam"]
- Vol 5 Notitiae Malabaricae. München: Iudicum Verl., 2003. ISBN 3-89129-935-4 ["Notes on Malabar": on the southern India region, known as South Kerala]
- Vol 6 Russlandtagebuch 1683. München: Iudicum Verl., 2003. ISBN 3-89129-936-2 ["Russia diary 1683"]

== Kaempfer's works ==
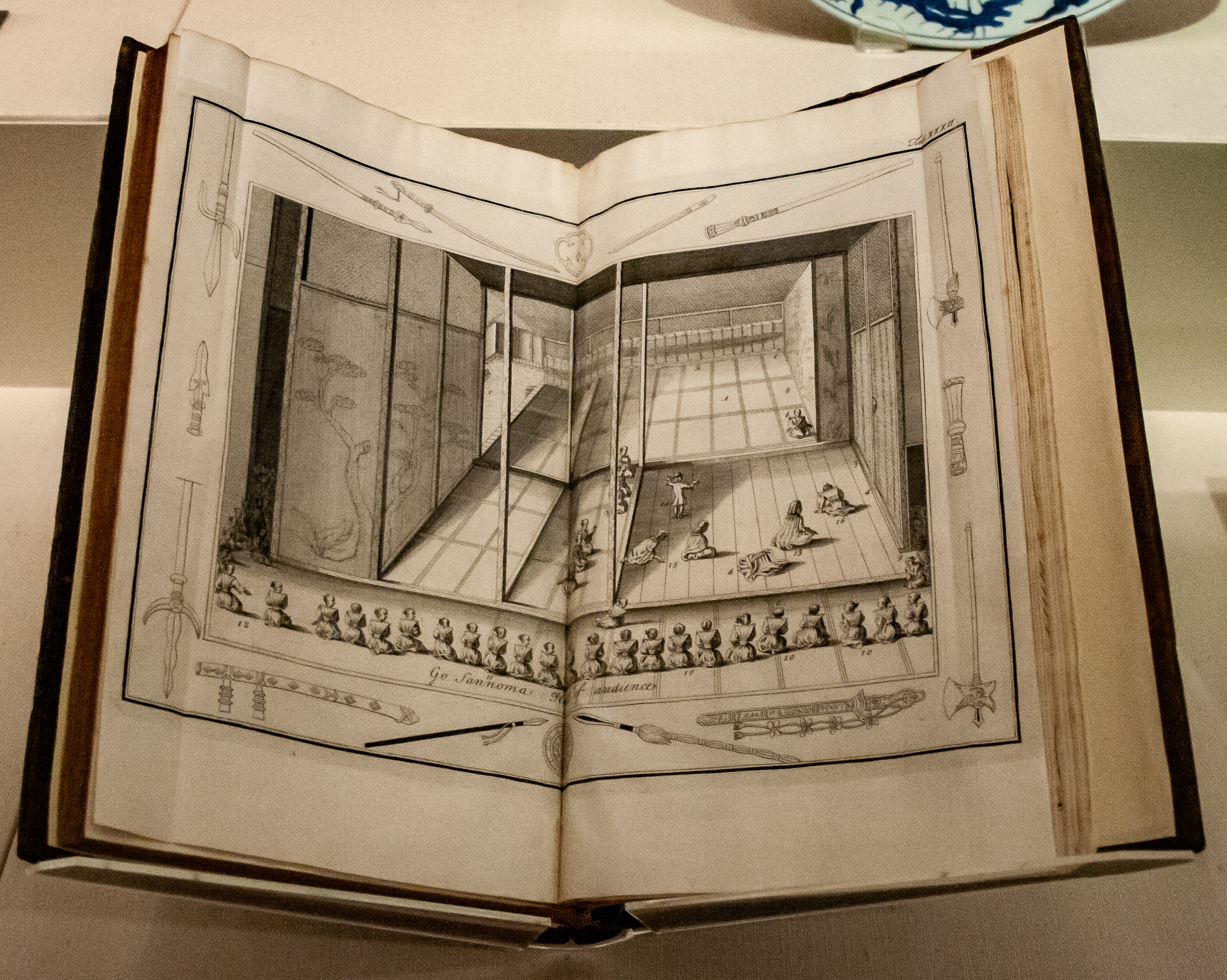
Dutch audience with the shogun of Japan. From the book History of Japan, 1727

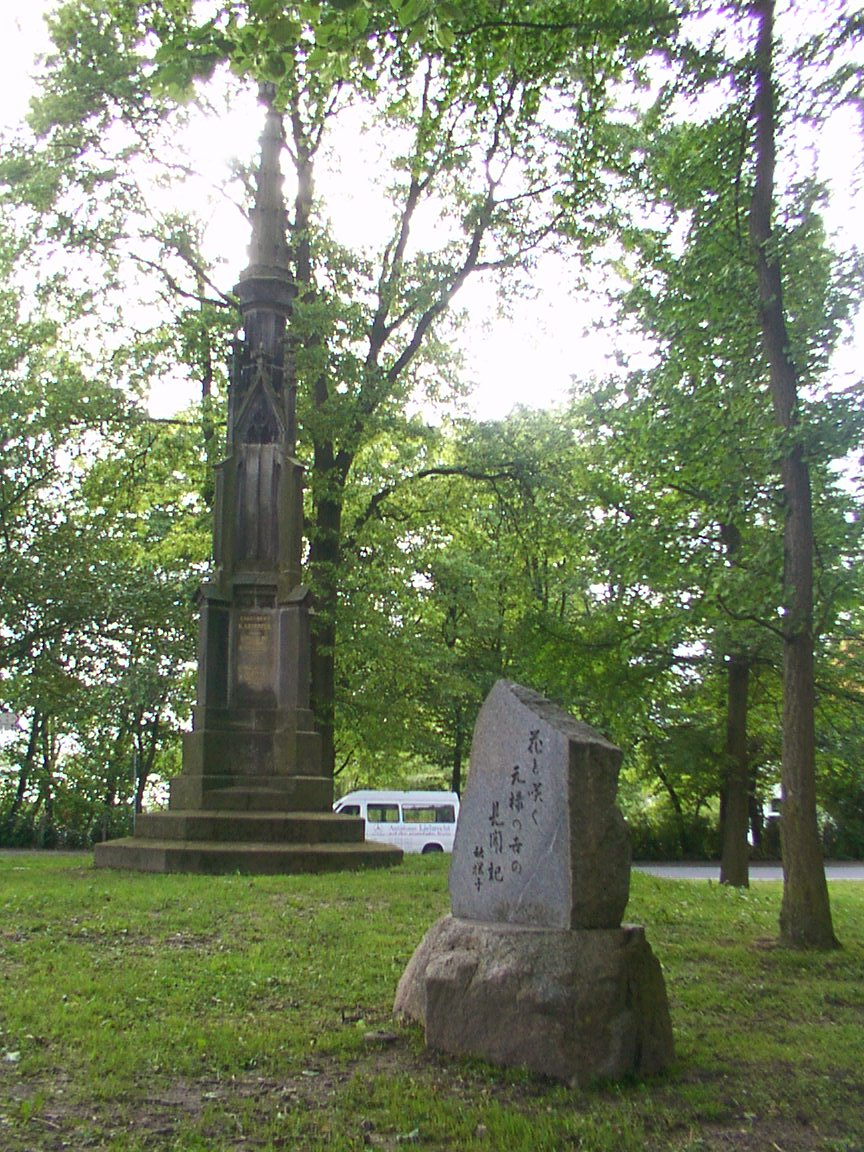
Monument to Kaempfer, erected in Lemgo in 1867

- Exercitatio politica de Majestatis divisione in realem et personalem, quam [...] in celeberr. Gedanensium Athenaei Auditorio Maximo Valedictionis loco publice ventilendam proponit Engelbertus Kämpffer Lemgovia-Westphalus Anno MDCLXXIII [= 1673] d. 8. Junii h. mat. Dantisci [= Danzig], Impr. David Fridericus Rhetius.
- Disputatio Medica Inauguralis Exhibens Decadem Observationum Exoticarum, quam [...] pro gradu doctoratus [...] publico examini subjicit Engelbert Kempfer, L. L. Westph. ad diem 22. Aprilis [...] Lugduni Batavorum [= Leiden], apud Abrahanum Elzevier, Academiae Typographum. MDCXCIV [= 1694].
- Amoenitatum exoticarum politico-physico-medicarum Fasciculi V [= quinque], Quibus continentur Variae Relationes, Observationes et Descriptiones Rerum persicarum & [= et] ulterioris Asiae, multâ attentione, in peregrinationibus per universum Orientum, collectae, ab Auctore Engelberto Kaempfero, D. Lemgoviae [= Lemgo], Typis & Impensis Henrici Wilhelmi Meyeri, Aulae Lippiacae Typographi, 1712 (Google, biodiversitylibrary.org)
- The History of Japan, giving an Account of the ancient and present State and Government of that Empire; of Its Temples, Palaces, Castles and other Buildings; of Its Metals, Minerals, Trees, Plants, Animals, Birds and Fishes; of The Chronology and Succession of the Emperors, Ecclesiastical and Secular; of The Original Descent, Religions, Customs, and Manufactures of the Natives, and of their Trade and Commerce with the Dutch and Chinese. Together with a Description of the Kingdom of Siam. Written in High-Dutch [= Hochdeutsch – High German] by Engelbertus Kaempfer, M. D. Physician to the Dutch Embassy to the Emperor's Court; and translated from his Original Manuscript, never before printed, by J. G. Scheuchzer, F. R. S. and a Member of the College of Physicians, London. With the Life of the Author, and an Introduction. Illustrated with many Copperplates. Vol. I/II. London: Printed for the Translator, MDCCXXVII [= 1727].
- De Beschryving van Japan, behelsende een Verhaal van den ouden en tegenwoordigen Staat en Regeering van dat Ryk, van deszelfs Tempels, Paleysen, Kasteelen en andere Gebouwen; van deszelfs Metalen, Mineralen, Boomen, Planten, Dieren, Vogelen en Visschen. Van de Tydrekening, en Opvolging van de Geestelyke en Wereldlyke Keyzers. Van de Oorsprondelyke Afstamming, Godsdiensten, Gewoonten en Handwerkselen der Inboorllingen, en van hunnen Koophandel met de Nederlanders en de Chineesen. Benevens eene Beschryving van het Koningryk Siam. In 't Hoogduytsch beschreven door Engelbert Kaempfer, M. D. Geneesherr van het Hollandsche Gezantschap na 't Hof van den Keyzer, Uyt het oorspronkelyk Hoogduytsch Handschrift, nooit te vooren gedrukt, in het Engelsch overgezet, door J. G. Scheuchzer, Lidt van de Koninklyke Maatschappy, en van die der Geneesheeren in London. Die daar by gevoegt heeft het Leven van den Schryver. Voorzien met kunstige Kopere Platen, onder het opzicht van den Ridder Hans Sloane uytgegeven, en uyt het Engelsch in 't Nederduytsch vertaalt. MDCCXXIX [= 1729].
- Engelbert Kämpfers Weyl. D. M. und Hochgräfl. Lippischen Leibmedikus Geschichte und Beschreibung von Japan. Aus den Originalhandschriften des Verfassers herausgegeben von Christian Wilhelm Dohm [...]. Erster Band. Mit Kupfern und Charten. Lemgo, im Verlage der Meyerschen Buchhandlung, 1777; Zweiter und lezter Band. Mit Kupfern und Charten. Lemgo, im Verlage der Meyerschen Buchhandlung, 1779.
- Icones selectae plantarum quas in Japonia collegit et delineavit Engelbertus Kaempfer (in Latin). London. 1791.
- Engelbert Kaempfer: 1651 – 1716. Seltsames Asien (Amoenitates Exoticae). In Auswahl übersetzt von Karl Meier-Lemgo, Detmold 1933
- "Engelbert Kaempfer: Am Hofe des persischen Großkönigs (1684–1685)", Ed. Walther Hinz, Stuttgart 1984.
- Engelbert Kaempfer: Der 5. Faszikel der "Amoenitates Exoticae" - die japanische Pflanzenkunde. Herausgegeben und kommentiert von Brigitte Hoppe und Wolfgang Michel-Zaitsu. Hildesheim/Zuerich/New York: Olms-Weidmann, 2019.

== Literature on E. Kaempfer ==
- Van Der Pas, Peter W.: Kaempfer, Engelbert. Complete Dictionary of Scientific Biography
- Kapitza, Peter: Engelbert Kaempfer und die europäische Aufklärung. Dem Andenken des Lemgoer Reisenden aus Anlaß seines 350. Geburtstags am 16. September 2001. München: Iudicum Verlag, 2002.
- Haberland, Detlef (Hrsg.): Engelbert Kaempfer – Werk und Wirkung. Stuttgart, Franz Steiner, 1993.
- Haberland, Detlef (Hrsg.): Engelbert Kaempfer (1651–1716): Ein Gelehrtenleben zwischen Tradition und Innovation. Wiesbaden, Harrassowitz, 2005.
- David Mervart: "A closed country in the open seas: Engelbert Kaempfer's Japanese solution for European modernity's predicament," in: History of European Ideas, 35,3 (2009), 321–329.
- Andreas W. Daum: "German Naturalists in the Pacific around 1800: Entanglement, Autonomy, and a Transnational Culture of Expertise," in Explorations and Entanglements: Germans in Pacific Worlds from the Early Modern Period to World War I, ed. Hartmut Berghoff, Frank Biess and Ulrike Strasser. New York: Berghahn Books, 2019, 79-102.

== See also ==
- Genroku
- Japanese era names
- Kaempferol
- List of Westerners who visited Japan before 1868
- Sakoku

== Bibliography ==
- Kaempfer, Engelbert. (1727). The History of Japan: Giving an Account of the Ancient and Present State and Government of That Empire ... of the Chronology and Succession of the Emperors ... Together with a Description of the Kingdom of Siam, translated by John Gaspar Scheuchzer. London: printed for the translator. OCLC 234194789
  - Kaempfer, Engelbert. (1906) The History of Japan: Together with a Description of the Kingdom of Siam, 1690–92, Vol I. London: J. MacLehose & Sons. OCLC 5174460
  - Kaempfer, Engelbert. (1906) The History of Japan: Together with a Description of the Kingdom of Siam, 1690–92, Vol II. London: J. MacLehose & Sons. OCLC 5174460
  - Kaempfer, Engelbert. (1906) The History of Japan: Together with a Description of the Kingdom of Siam, 1690–92, Vol III. London: J. MacLehose & Sons. OCLC 5174460
- Beatrice Bodart-Bailey and Derek Massarella. The Furthest Goal: Engelbert Kaempfer's Encounter with Tokugawa Japan. Routledge, 2012. ISBN 1136637834
