= Luis de Almeida (missionary) =

Portuguese missionary (1525–1597)

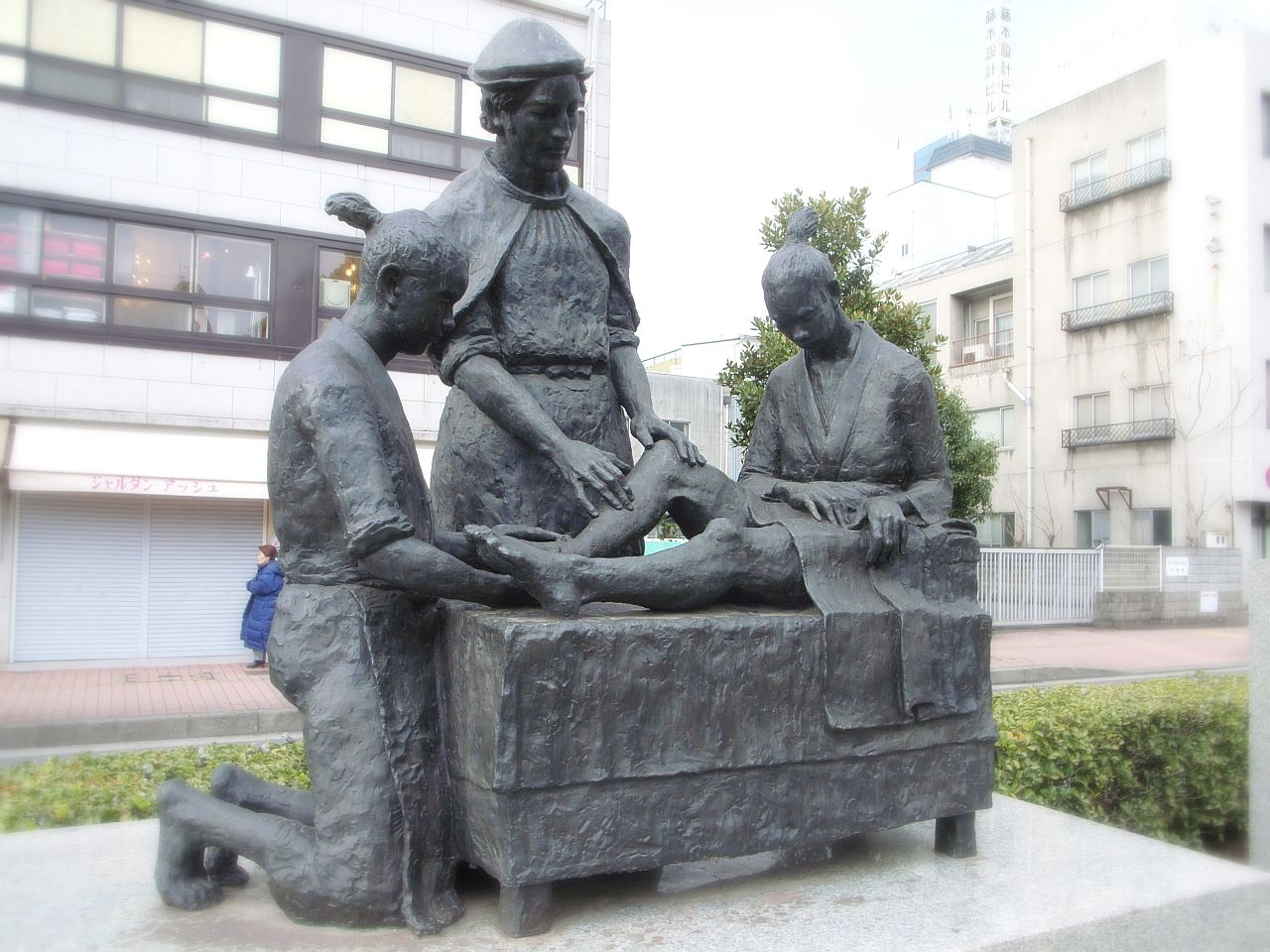
- Bronze statue in front of the Almeida Memorial Hospital in Ōita
- Born: c. 1525; Lisbon, Portugal
- Died: October 1583; Kawachiura, Amakusa, Japan
- Occupations: Surgeon, merchant and missionary

Luis de Almeida (1525–1583) was a Portuguese surgeon, merchant and missionary of the Society of Jesus in Japan. He is credited for introducing Western medicine to Japan and establishing the first "western" hospital in Japan.

== Life ==
Luis de Almeida was born in 1525 in Lisbon in a New Christian family that had converted from Judaism to Christianity. After two years of training at the prestigious Hospital Real de Todos os Santos, he received surgical license in March 1546 by the Portuguese king. Afterwards he moved to Goa and from there to Macau and became involved in intra-Asian trade with some success. These activities brought him for the first time to Japan in 1552, where the era of direct and sustained Euro-Japanese contacts had begun with the Nanban trade, attracting Portuguese merchants who fulfilled the Japanese demand for silk, cotton, Chinese medicines and other goods that Japan could not produce in sufficient quantities. During his voyage to Asia he was deeply moved by the Jesuit missionaries who tended to the passengers' spiritual needs. Upon reaching Japan, he resolved to travel to Yamaguchi to meet the Jesuit father Cosme de Torres, who was in charge of the mission after Francis Xavier's departure, and from there the two kept in close contact.

In 1555, during his second visit to Japan, he joined the Society of Jesus and was now looking for ways to make good use of his accumulated financial resources. His personal wealth and his continued involvement in the Sino-Japanese silk trade kept the Jesuits financially afloat and provided the funds for various charitable efforts in Japan. For example, in the year of his accession he founded an orphanage in Funai (today Ōita) in the east of the island of Kyushu, because many children had lost their parents due to the fierce hegemonic struggles of the Sengoku period. However, because Almeida's commercial activities, the Jesuits in Japan attracted criticism from Rome for dabbling in trade.

In 1556 he built a hospital in Funai with the permission of the daimyō Ōtomo Sōrin. The construction costs (about 5000 cruzados) were covered from his fortune. As far as the letters sent to Goa and Europe show, this hospital was able to accommodate about 100 patients. Initially, Almeida was in charge of the surgical department, and internal medicine was in the hands of converted Japanese doctors, who were so successful in applying Chinese-Japanese therapies that some of them were singled out by name. The hospital had departments for surgery, internal medicine, and leprosy, and was the first hospital in Japan where Western medicine was introduced. He also began medical education in 1558, training doctors.

He also established a mutual aid organization for Christians in Ōita called "Misericórdia".

Luís de Almeida was also active in evangelism, and Father Cosme de Torres often sent Almeida to areas where it seemed difficult to convert people. The learned Almeida was good at responding to the desires of monks and other intellectuals, and led them to convert. As a doctor, he helped the poor and sick, and gained many followers. Even after he began his work as a priest, he continued to invest in trade, raised funds for hospitals, and generously donated his personal fortune to the Japanese Church, which was suffering from chronic financial difficulties.

After 1560, Almeida had to give up leading the hospital since an order had arrived in Japan forbidding members of the Society from providing medical practices. From that time on he became an accountant for the Jesuits, and spent 1561 proselytizing in Hakata (now part of the city of Fukuoka), Hirado, and Kagoshima. In 1562 he obtained the landing permit for Portuguese ships in Yokoseura, which briefly thrived as a Portuguese port before it was destroyed the next year by rival merchants. The following year he founded churches in Shimabara and Kuchinotsu. In 1565 he spent his time in the Kansai area, leaving descriptions of a Japanese tea ceremony he witnessed in Sakai and of the magnificent temples of Nara. He did not fully abandon medicine, as he still helped in the Funai hospital, cared for other Jesuit fathers, and administered medicine for Japanese daimyo on occasion.

After years of tireless efforts in the Japanese mission, Almeida was ordained a priest in Macau in 1580. Upon returning to Japan, he was made Superior of Amakusa, which had become Christianized through his efforts. He died three years later in Kawachiura (河内浦; now part of Amakusa City). The hospital he built in Funai was destroyed in 1587 by troops from Satsuma.

A statue of him was erected in Almeida Memorial Hospital in Ōita and Martyrs' Park in Amakusa.

== Sources ==
- Bowers, John Z. (1970). Western medical pioneers in feudal Japan. Baltimore: Johns Hopkins Press. ISBN 0801810817. OCLC 58748.
- Hesselink, Reinier H. (2015). The Dream of Christian Nagasaki: World Trade and the Clash of Cultures, 1560-1640. McFarland. ISBN 9780786499618.
- Leitão, Ana Maria (1993). "The Jesuits and the Japan Trade". Review of Culture. 17. Instituto cultural de Macau: 23–34.
- Michel, Wolfgang (1993). "Frühe westliche Beobachtungen zur Akupunktur und Moxibustion". In: Sudhoffs Archiv für Geschichte der Medizin und der Naturwissenschaften. 77 (2): 194–222.
- Michel, Wolfgang (2001). "On the Reception of Western Medicine in Seventeenth Century Japan". In: Yoshida Tadashi / Fukase Yasuaki(ed.), Higashi to nishi no iryôbunka [Medicine and Culture in East and West]. Kyôto: Shibunkaku Publisher. ISBN 4784210806. pp. 3–17.
- Yuuki, Diego R. (1990). "Luís de Almeida: Doctor, Traveller And Priest". Review of Culture. 10. Instituto cultural de Macau: 7–26.
- Iwasa, Kiyoshi (1966). "Hospitals in Japan: History and Present Situation". Medical Care. 4 (4): 241–246. doi:10.1097/00005650-196610000-00009.
