= Wolfgang Michel-Zaitsu =

Wolfgang Michel/Michel-Zaitsu (born 1946 in Frankfurt am Main, Germany) is a professor emeritus of Kyushu University in Fukuoka (Japan). He is a specialist in medicine and allied sciences in the history of east–west cultural exchange. In 1984 he was granted tenure as the first foreigner in a Japanese national university.

== Research topics ==
- Western medicine and allied sciences in early modern Japan.
- History of "Dutch Learning" (Rangaku) and "Western Studies" (yôgaku) in early modern Japan
- Acupuncture and moxibustion in Europe (16–19th century)
- Eclecticism and indigenous knowledge in early modern Japanese medicine

By combining Japanese and Western manuscript sources, Michel shed new light on Western medicine and allied sciences in early modern Japan and the interdependence of Western studies on Eastern medicine and Japanese studies on Western medicine. His research clarified the mechanism of early medical interactions between Japan and Europe and induced a revision of the concept of ‘Dutch Studies’ (rangaku) in Edo period Japan. The beginning of Western medicine in Japan is shown as a result of structural conditions, political strategies, individual ambitions and occasional events. At the same time, the introduction of Western treatment methods strongly influenced Japanese research in related fields such as botany and pharmaceutical production techniques while stimulating language studies and the import of Western books. In contrast to previous research on these matters, Michel demonstrates that this change was supported by the Tokugawa shogunate and began soon after the ‘closure’ of Japan (Sakoku) in mid-17th century.

The names of some of the Europeans who introduced Western medicine to Japan can also be found in publications on the history of traditional Chinese medicine in Europe. Michel demonstrated that considerable parts of their reports are actually reflecting genuine Japanese innovations that were not known in China. According to Michel, early modern traditional Japanese medicine (TJM) is clearly distinguished from Traditional Chinese Medicine (TCM) and deserves its own place in Far Eastern medical traditions.

Furthermore, Michel brought to light the biographical background and historical influence of numerous personalities involved in early modern exchange between Japan and the West. Especially his writings on Caspar Schamberger, father of the first Japanese school of Western-style surgery, and Engelbert Kaempfer, author of the famous “History of Japan”, are regarded as pioneering contributions. Michel's critical edition of Kaempfer's unpublished manuscripts provided a more solid foundation for studies on the history of Western observations on Edo-period Japan and the perception of Japan during the Age of Enlightenment. In acknowledgement of his research Michel was awarded the Federal Cross of Merit by the German president Johannes Rau.

From 2008 to 2021 Michel was a member of the permanent executive board of the Japanese Society for the History of Medicine (Nihon Ishi Gakkai).

== Awards ==
- Science Promotion Award (Japanese Society for the History of Medicine, 1996)
- Federal Cross of Merit (President of the Federal Republic of Germany, 2004)
- Yakazu Medical History Award (Japanese Society for the History of Medicine, 2018)
- Itan Award (Japanese Society for the History of Medicine Kansai Chapter, 2018)
- Engelbert-Kaempfer-Medaille 2024 für Völkerverständigung, Menschenrechte und Wissenschaft (Engelbert Kaempfer Medal for outstanding merits in the field of international understanding, human rights, science and research, City of Lemgo+Engelbert Kaempfer Association)

== Published work (selection) ==
- Michel, Wolfgang (2023), Tennentō to no tatakai IV: Higashinihon no shutō (Fighting small-pox − Vaccination in Eastern Japan). Tokyo: Iwata Shoin, 2023, 379pp. (with Aoki, Toshiyuki; ISBN 978-4-86602-153-9).
- Michel, Wolfgang (2022), Tennentō to no tatakai III: Chūbunihon no shutō (Fighting small-pox − Vaccination in Western Japan). Tokyo: Iwata Shoin, 2022. (with Aoki, Toshiyuki; ISBN 978-4-86602-138-6).
- Michel, Wolfgang (2022), Rangoyakusen (Reverse Edition). Nakatsu History Museum, Medical Archive Series No. 21, 324pp. ISSN 2432-0773
- Michel, Wolfgang (2021), Tennentō to no tatakai II: Nishinihon no shutō. Tokyo: Iwata Shoin. (with Aoki, Toshiyuki; ISBN 978-4-86602-118-8).
- Engelbert Kaempfer, Der 5. Faszikel der „Amoenitates Exoticae“ – die japanische Pflanzenkunde. Herausgegeben und kommentiert von Brigitte Hoppe und Wolfgang Michel-Zaitsu. Hildesheim/Zürich/New York: Olms-Weidmann, 2019. ISBN 978-3-615-00436-6.
- Michel, Wolfgang (2018), Tennentō to no tatakai – Kyushu no shutō [Fighting small-pox – Vaccination in Kyushu]. Tokyo: Iwata Shoin (with Aoki, Toshiyuki and Oshima, Akihide; ISBN 978-4-86602-036-5)
- __________. (2018), Bastaardt Woordenboek (Dutch Edition 1688 / Japanese Version 1822). Nakatsu Municipal Museum for History and Folklore, Medical Archive Series No. 17, Nakatsu (introduction in Japanese; ISSN 2432-0773). (Pdf-file)
- Michel-Zaitsu, Wolfgang (2017), Traditionelle Medizin in Japan – Von der Frühzeit bis zur Gegenwart [History of traditional Japanese medicine (TJM)]. Muenchen: Kiener Verlag. ISBN 978-3-943324-75-4 (Yakazu Medical History Award)
- Michel, Wolfgang (2010), »Der Ost-Indischen und angrenzenden Königreiche, vornehmste Seltenheiten betreffende kurze Erläuterung« – Neue Funde zum Leben und Werk des Leipziger Chirurgen und Handelsmanns Caspar Schamberger (1623–1706). Fukuoka: Hana-Shoin. ISBN 978-4-903554-71-6 [Extremely rare private 17th century print on the East-Indies, edited together with an extensive analysis]
- __________. (2009), Kyūshū no rangaku – ekkyō to kōryū ['Dutch Learning' in Kyushu - Border crossing and exchange] . Shibunkaku shuppan. (with Torii Yumiko and Kawashima Mahito) ISBN 978-4-7842-1410-5
- __________. (2008), On Caspar Schamberger's Activities in Japan (1650/51) and Early Caspar-Style Surgery. Languages and Cultures Series No 18. Kyushu University, 2008, 256 pp. [in Japanese]
- __________. (2001), Engelbert Kaempfer: Heutiges Japan. Iudicium. ISBN 3-89129-931-1 [Volume 1: Critical edition of Engelbert Kaempfer's manuscript about Japan. Vol 2: Annotations, comments, essays]
- __________. (1999), Von Leipzig nach Japan – Der Chirurg und Handelsmann Caspar Schamberger (1623–1706) [From Leipzig to Japan - The Surgeon and Merchant Caspar Schamberger (1623–1706)]. Iudicium. ISBN 3-89129-442-5
- __________. (1993), Erste Abhandlung über die Moxibustion in Europa: das genau untersuchte und auserfundene Podagra, vermittelst selbst sicher-eigenen Genäsung und erlösenden Hülff-Mittels [First Treatise on moxibustion in Europe]. Haug. ISBN 3-7760-1327-3
