= Shimetarō Hara =

Japanese physician, known for his research in Moxibustion

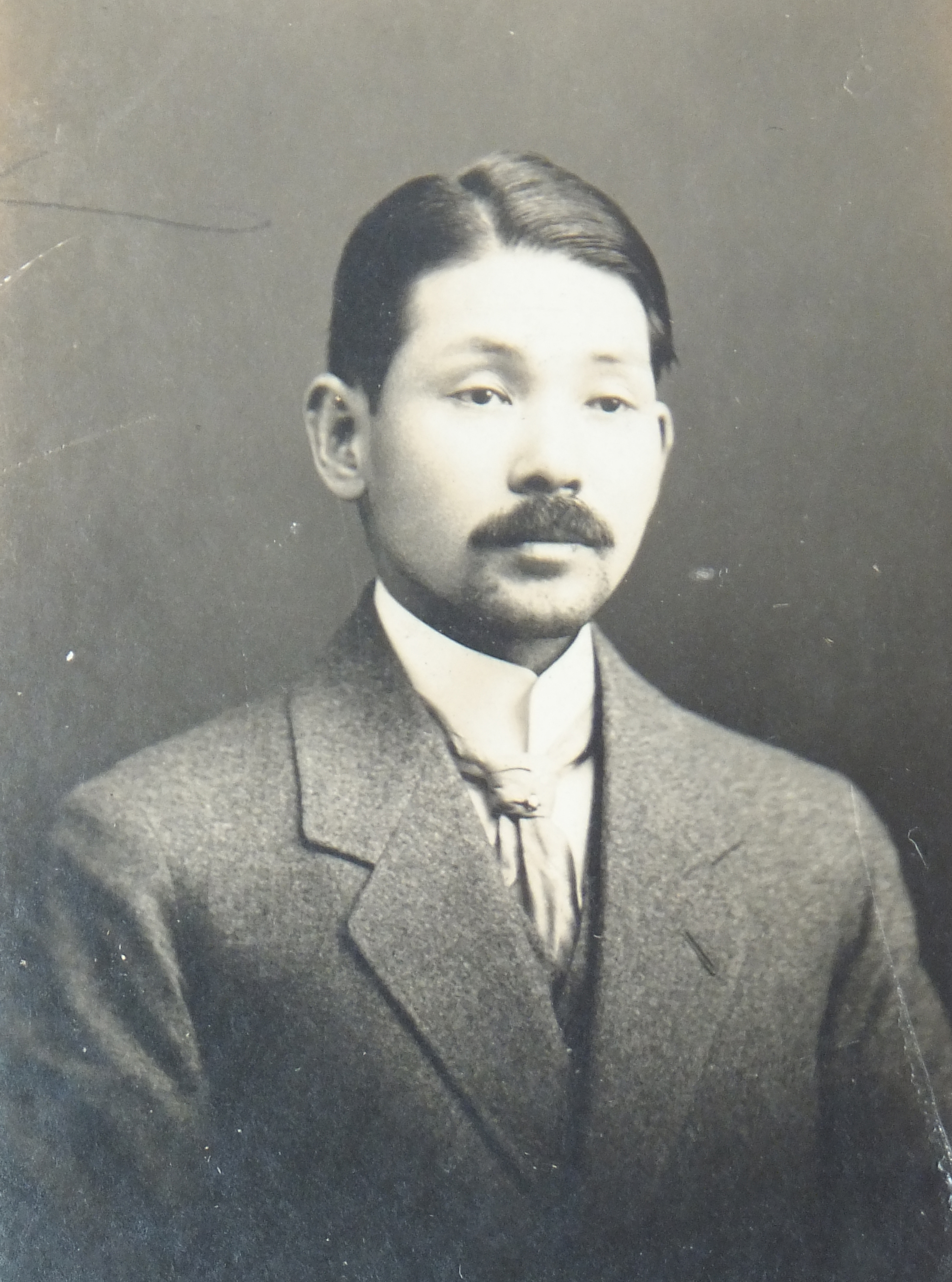

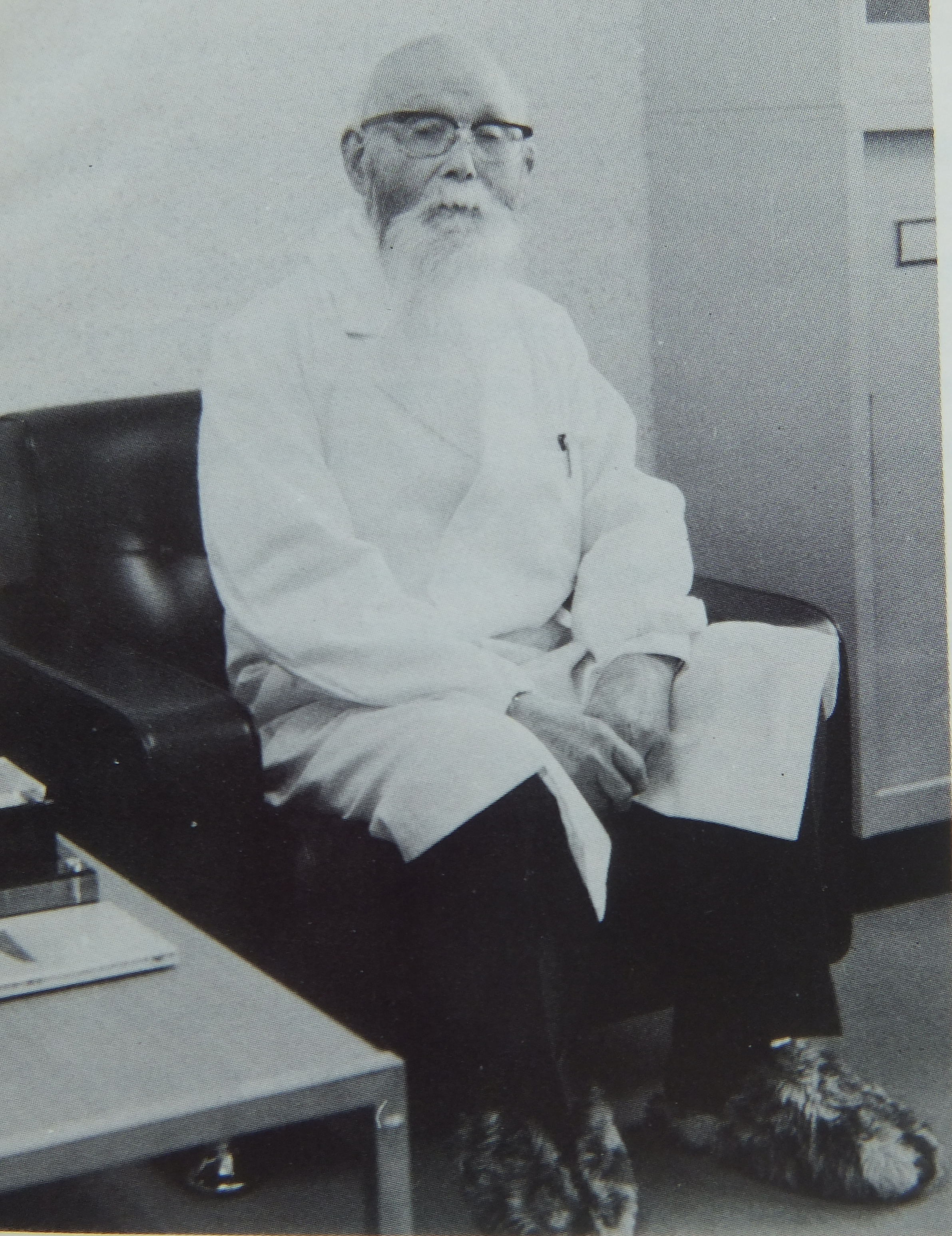
Shimetarō Hara in 1982

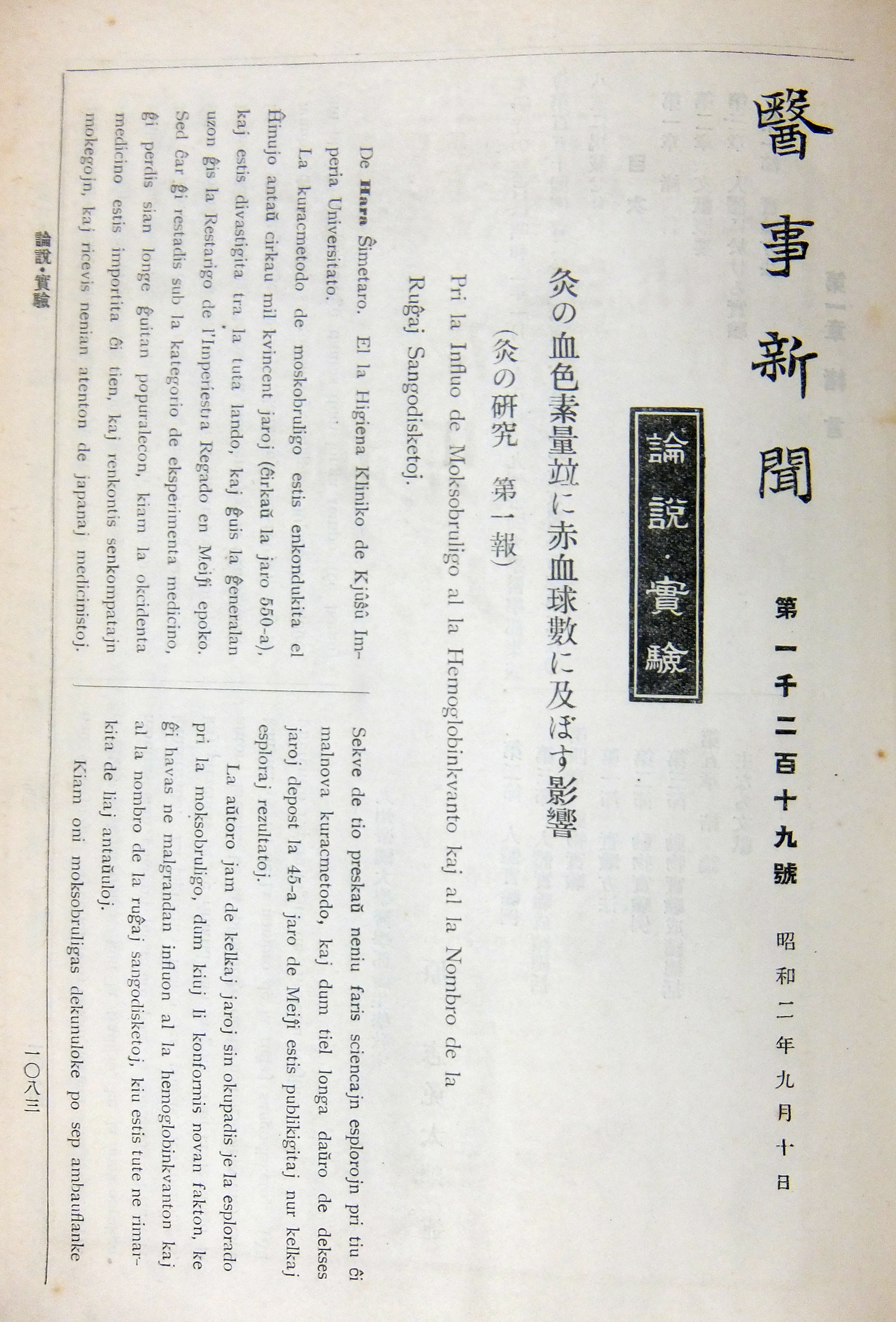
First page of Shimetarō Hara: Effects of Moxa on hemoglobin and RBC count. Iji Shinbun, no 1219, 10 Sept. 1927. (Summary in Esperanto)

Shimetarō Hara (原 志免太郎, Hara Shimetarō; 4 October 1882 – 18 June 1991) was a Japanese physician, famous for his research in moxibustion, and active as medical doctor until age 104. At the time of his death at age 108 years, 257 days, Hara had been the oldest Japanese man alive after 109-year-old Nisaburo Matsuyama's death on 3 April 1991, and was succeeded as Japan's oldest living man by Gihei Oka. He, and proponents of moxibustion, have attributed his longevity to his practice of moxibustion on acupuncture point ST36 upon himself.
