= Imatto-canna =

Mistaken report of a third syllabary in Japanese

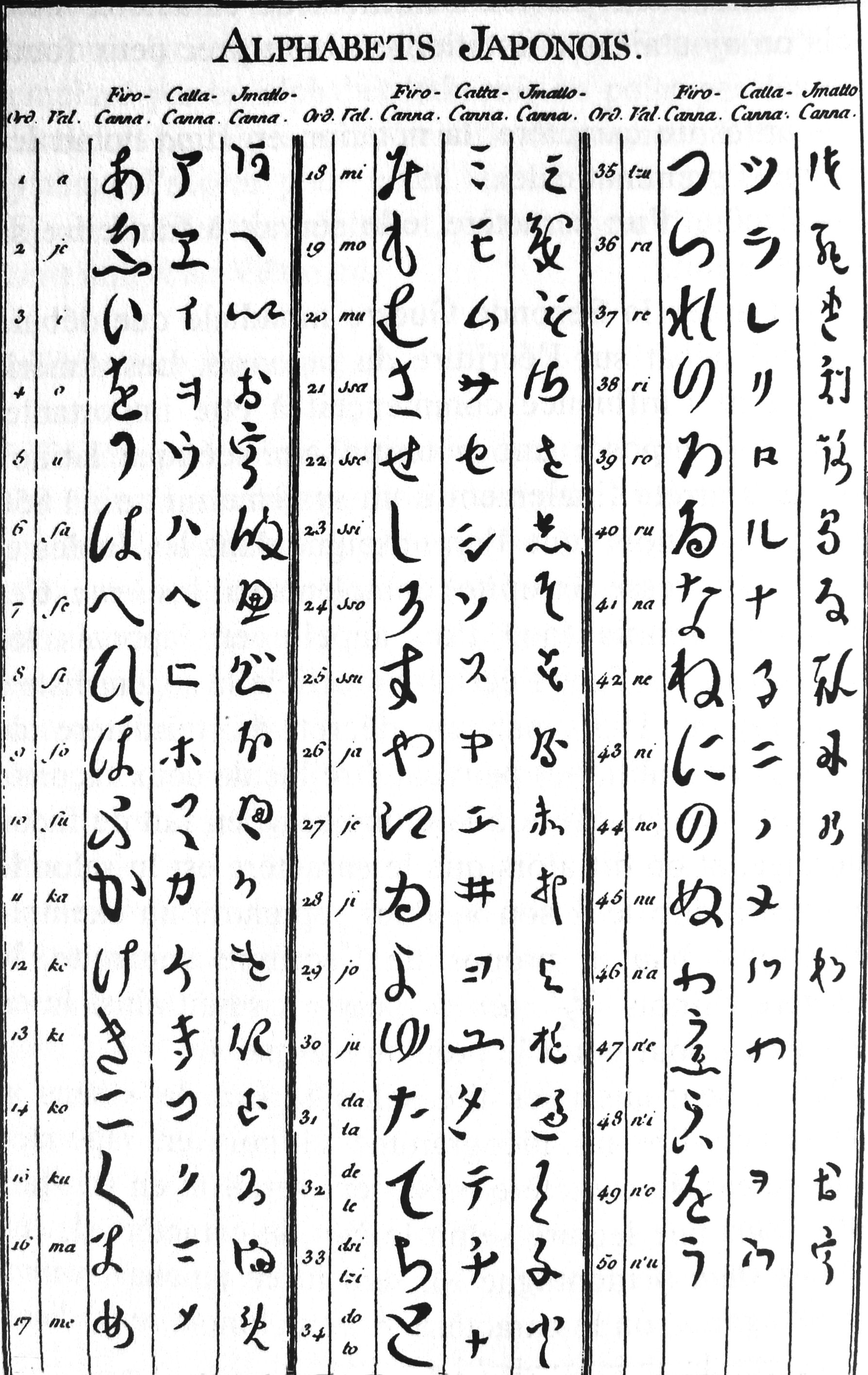
"Japanese alphabets", including Imatto-canna (third column). Diderot Encyclopedia 18th century.

Imatto-canna (also written Imatto canna or Jamatto canna) was a false Japanese syllabary reported by the German traveller Engelbert Kaempfer in his book Amoenitatum exoticarum politico-physico-medicarum fasciculi V. (1712).

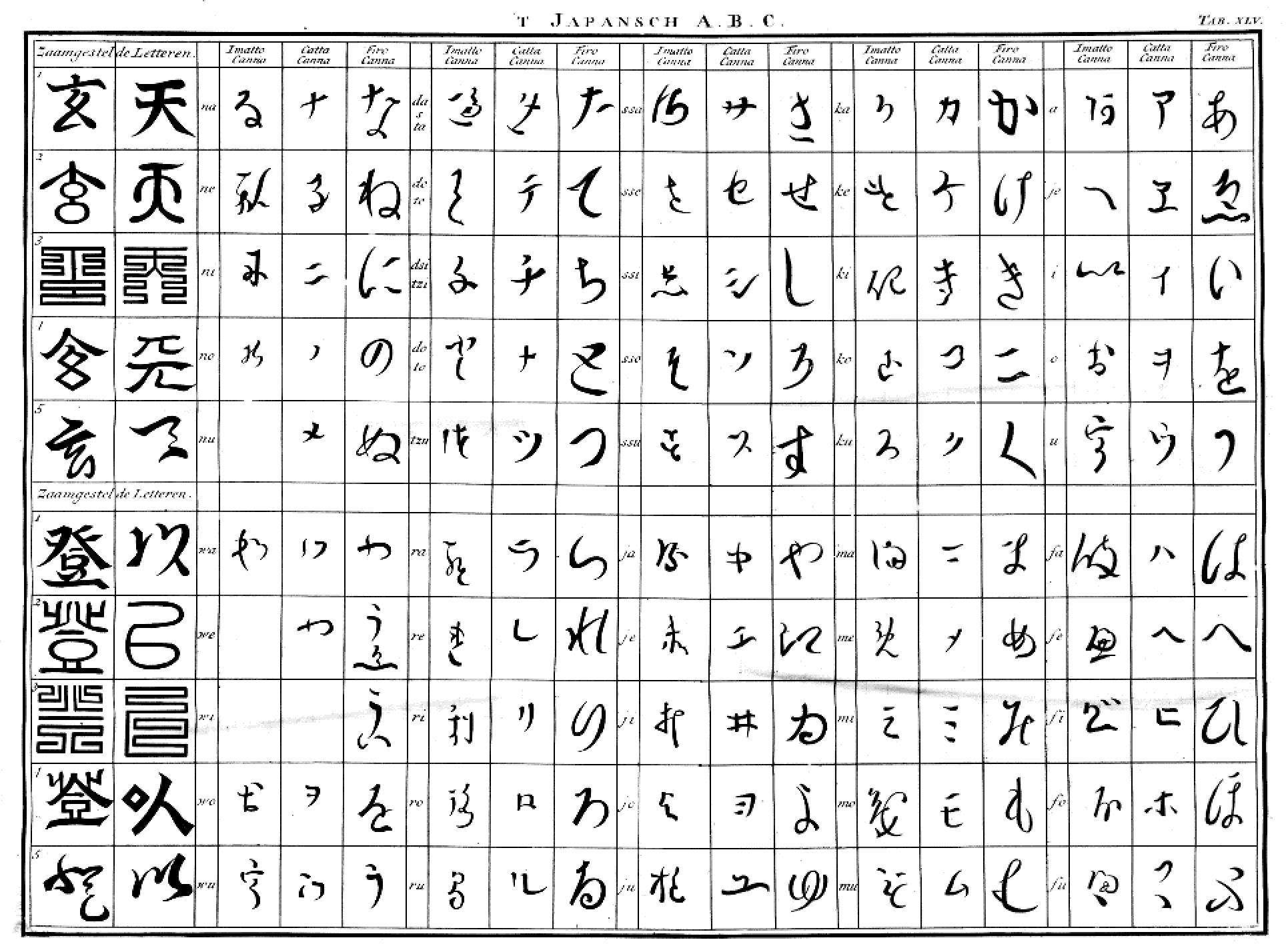
"Japanese alphabet", including "Iamato-canna" by Engelbert Kaempfer, 1690-1693.

He wrote that Japan had three syllabaries: firo-canna (hiragana) and catta-canna (katakana), both used by commons, and imatto-canna, used by nobles. However, the imatto-canna he believed to exist were just variant forms of hiragana called hentaigana. Being hentaigana, they did not make up a cohesive or independent writing system, and were in often free variation with other hiragana characters. The only other Japanese syllabary besides hiragana and katakana is their precursor man'yōgana, use of which had died out well before 1712.

Imatto-canna was probably his transliteration of the word yamato-gana, which actually means kana in general, both hiragana and katakana.
