= Niyazoba =

- Municipality
- Location within Azerbaijan
- Coordinates: 41°31′07″N 48°54′51″E
- Country: Azerbaijan
- Rayon: Khachmaz

Population
  - Total: 1,352
- Time zone: UTC+4 (AZT)
  - Summer (DST): UTC+5 (AZT)

Niyazoba (also, Mikhailovka, Mikhaylovka, and Nizovaya) is a village and municipality in the Khachmaz Rayon of Azerbaijan. It has a population of 1,352.
