= Moxibustion =

Traditional Chinese medical practice

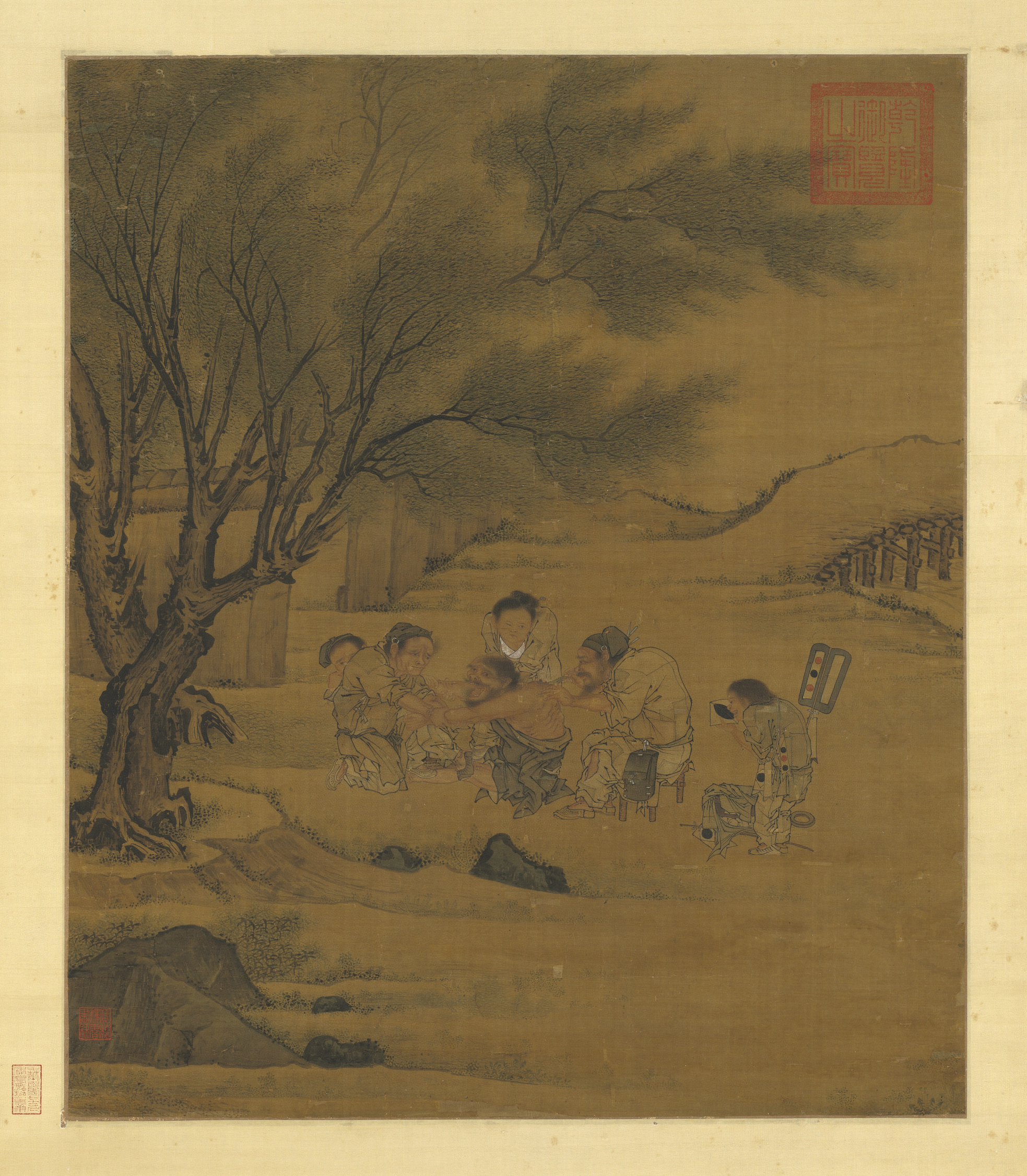
- Moxibustion by Li Tang, Song dynasty
- MeSH: D009071

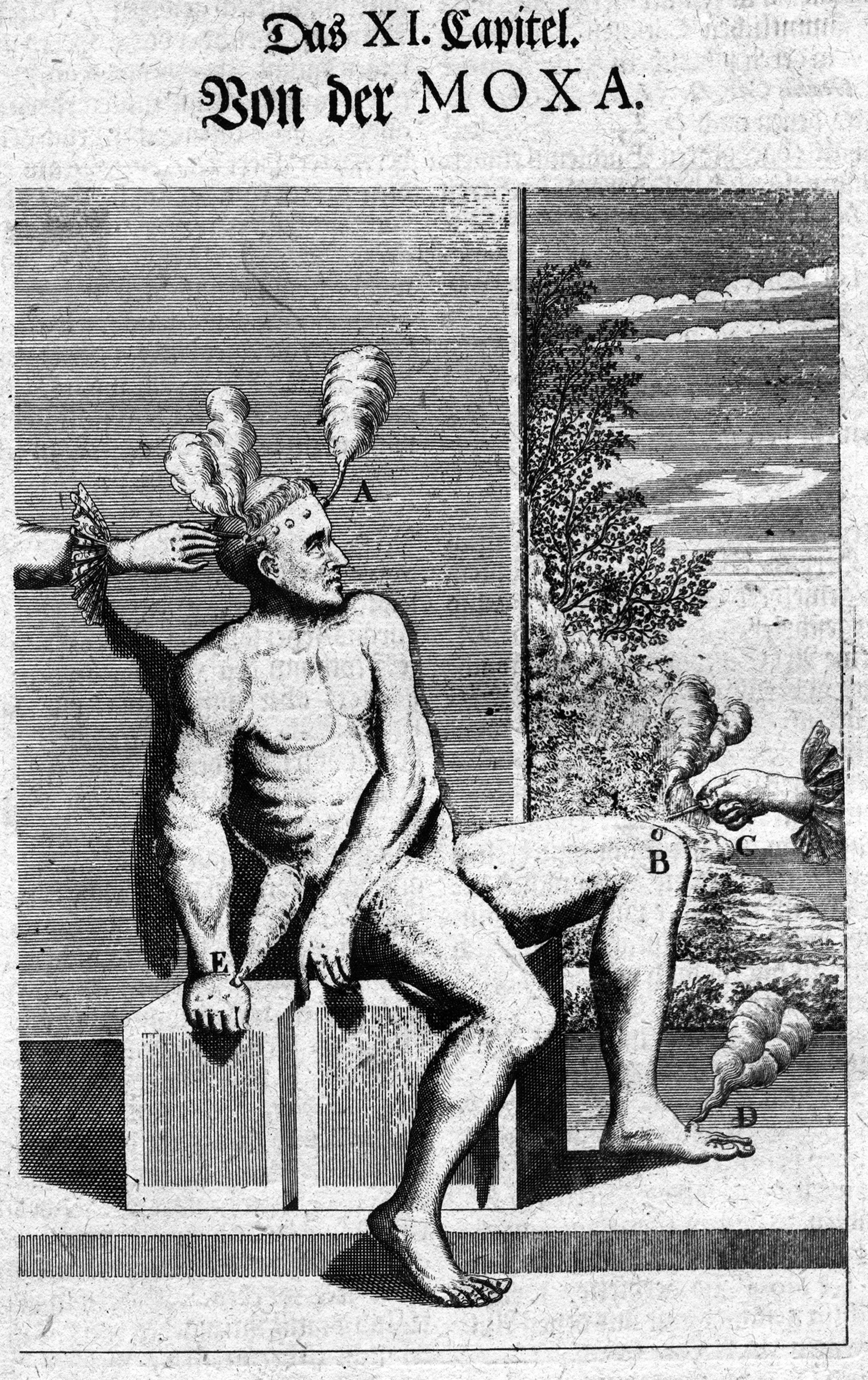
Moxibustion in Michael Bernhard Valentini's Museum Museorum (Frankfurt am Main, 1714)

Moxibustion (Chinese: 灸; pinyin: jiǔ) is a traditional Chinese medicine therapy which consists of burning dried mugwort (moxa) on particular points on the body. It plays an important role in the traditional medical systems of China, Japan, Korea, Vietnam, and Mongolia. Suppliers usually age the mugwort and grind it up to a fluff; practitioners burn the fluff or process it further into a cigar-shaped stick. They can use it indirectly, with acupuncture needles, or burn it on the patient's skin.

Moxibustion is promoted as a treatment for a wide variety of conditions, but its use is not backed by good evidence and it carries a risk of adverse effects.

== Terminology ==
The first Western remarks on moxibustion can be found in letters and reports written by Portuguese missionaries in 16th-century Japan. They called it botão de fogo (lit. 'fire button'), a term originally used for round-headed Western cautery irons. Hermann Buschoff, who published the first Western book on this matter in 1674 (English edition 1676), used the Japanese pronunciation mogusa (from "moe-gusa", lit. burning herb). As the u is not very strongly enunciated, he spelled it "Moxa". Later authors blended "Moxa" with the Latin word combustio ("burning").

The name of the herb Artemisia (mugwort) species used to produce Moxa is called ài or àicǎo (艾, 艾草) in Chinese and yomogi (蓬) in Japan. The Chinese names for moxibustion are jiǔ (灸) or jiǔshù (灸術); the Japanese use the same characters and pronounce them as kyū and kyūjutsu. In Korean the reading is tteum (뜸). Korean folklore attributes the development of moxibustion to the legendary emperor Dangun.

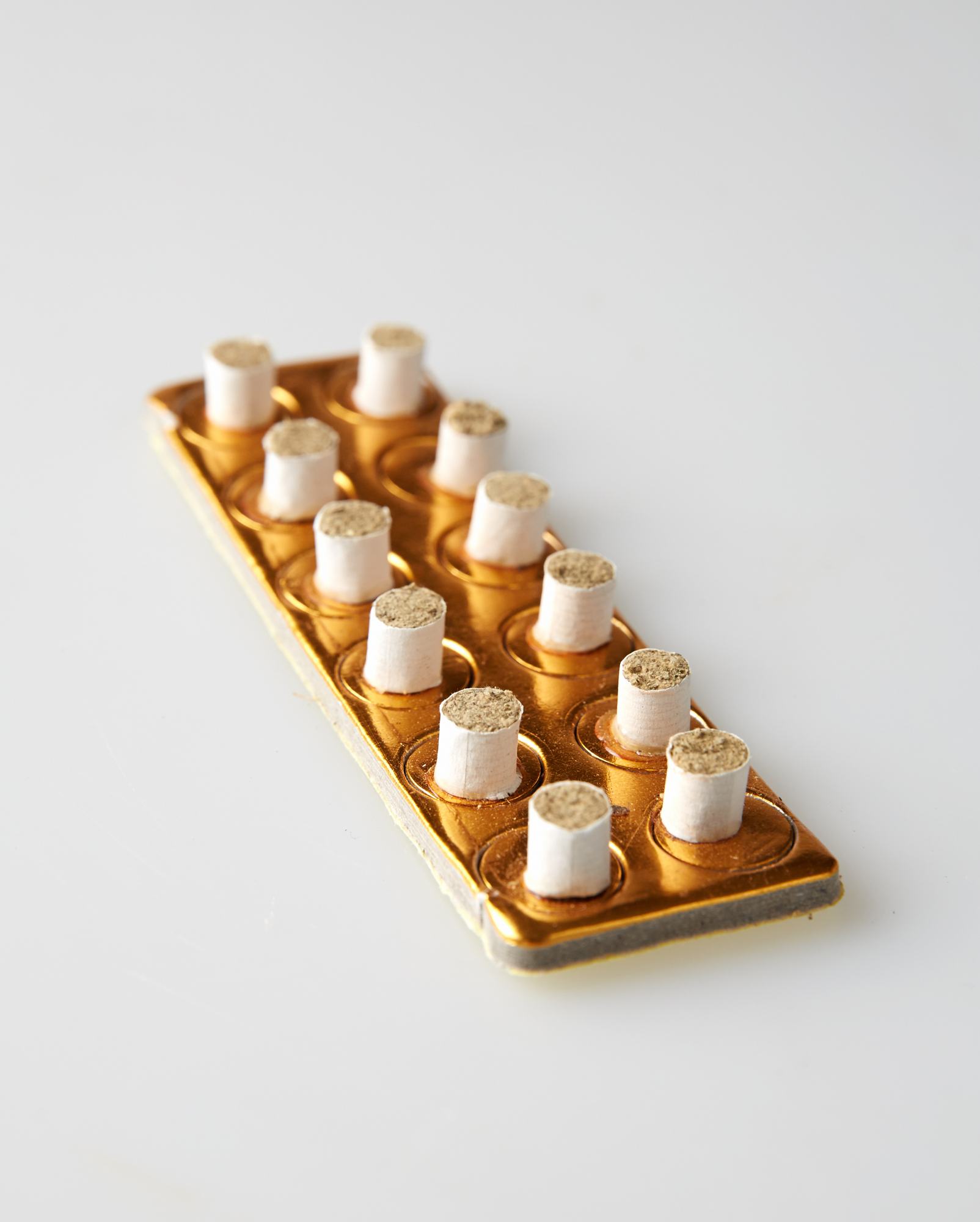
a Korean set of tteum

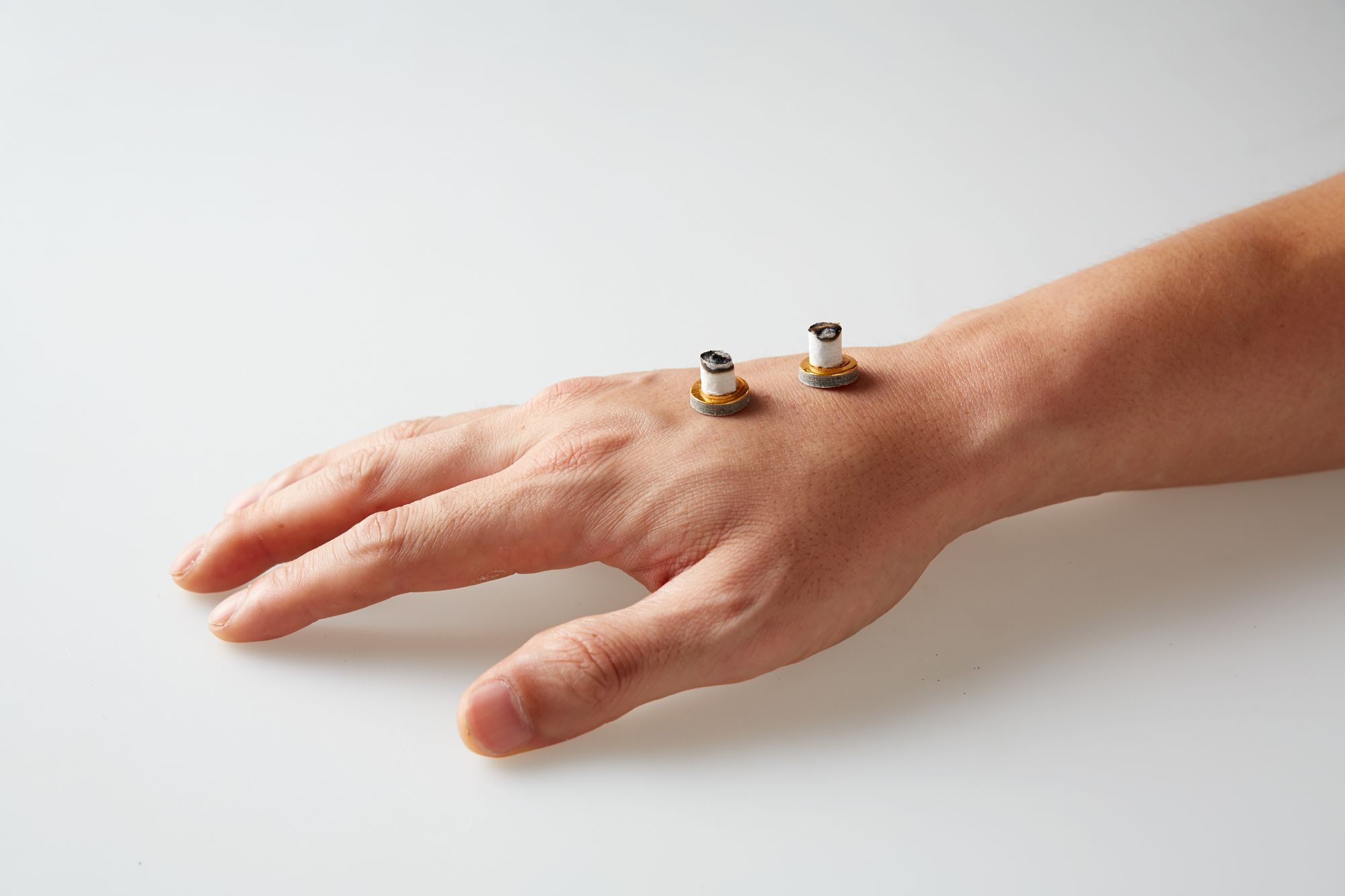
application of tteum on the back of a hand

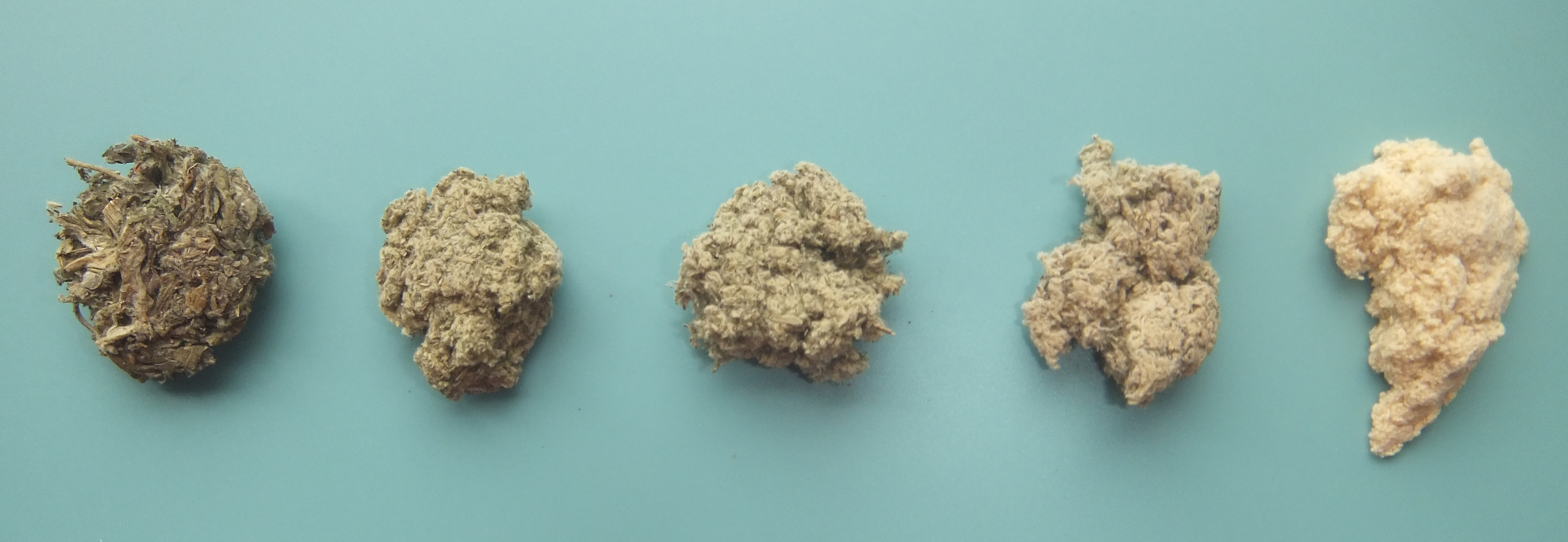
Samples of Japanese Moxa. Left to right: processed mugwort (1st stage); processed mugwort (2nd stage); coarse Moxa for indirect moxibustion; usual quality for indirect and direct moxibustion; superior quality for direct moxibustion.

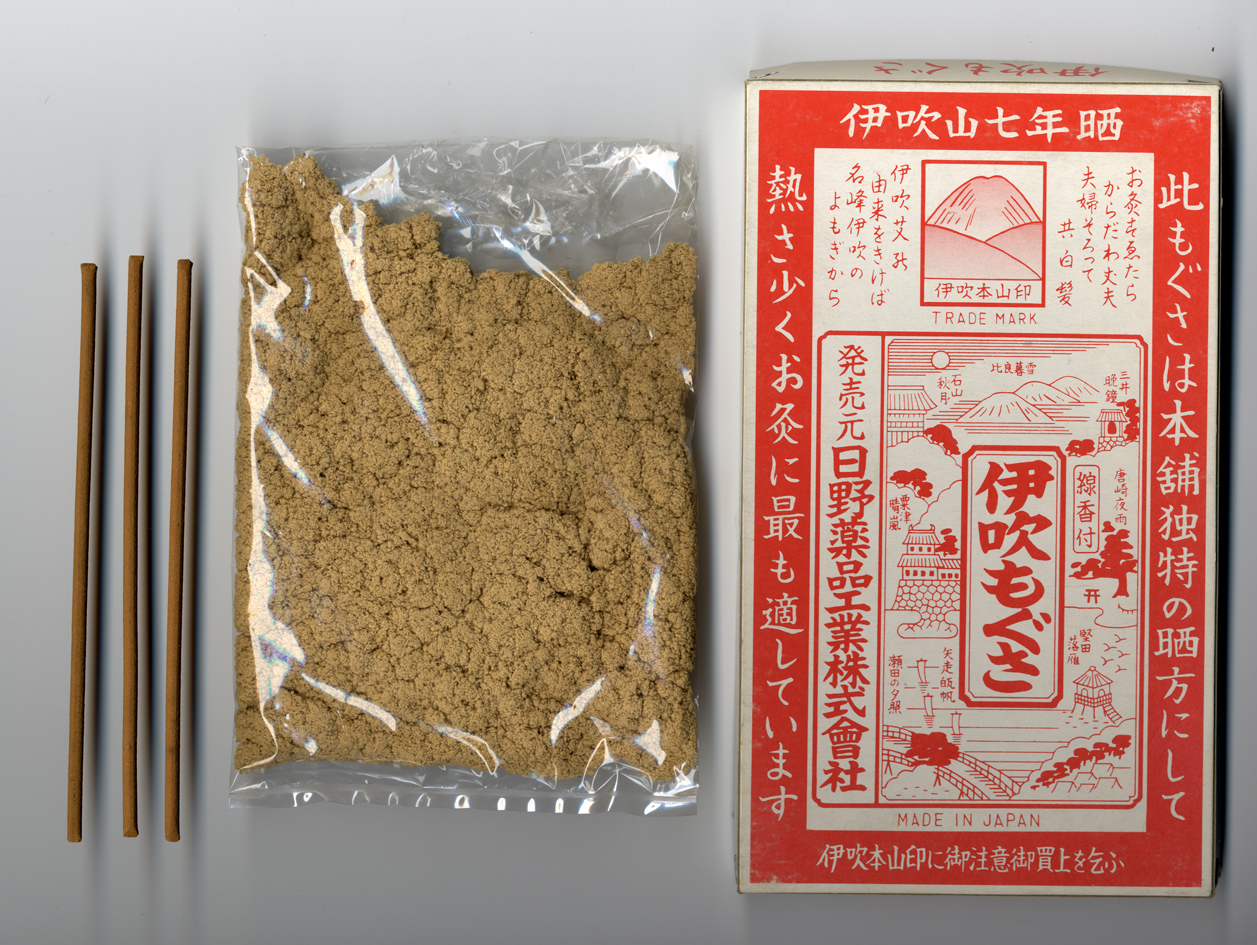
Traditional moxibustion set from Maibara (Japan)

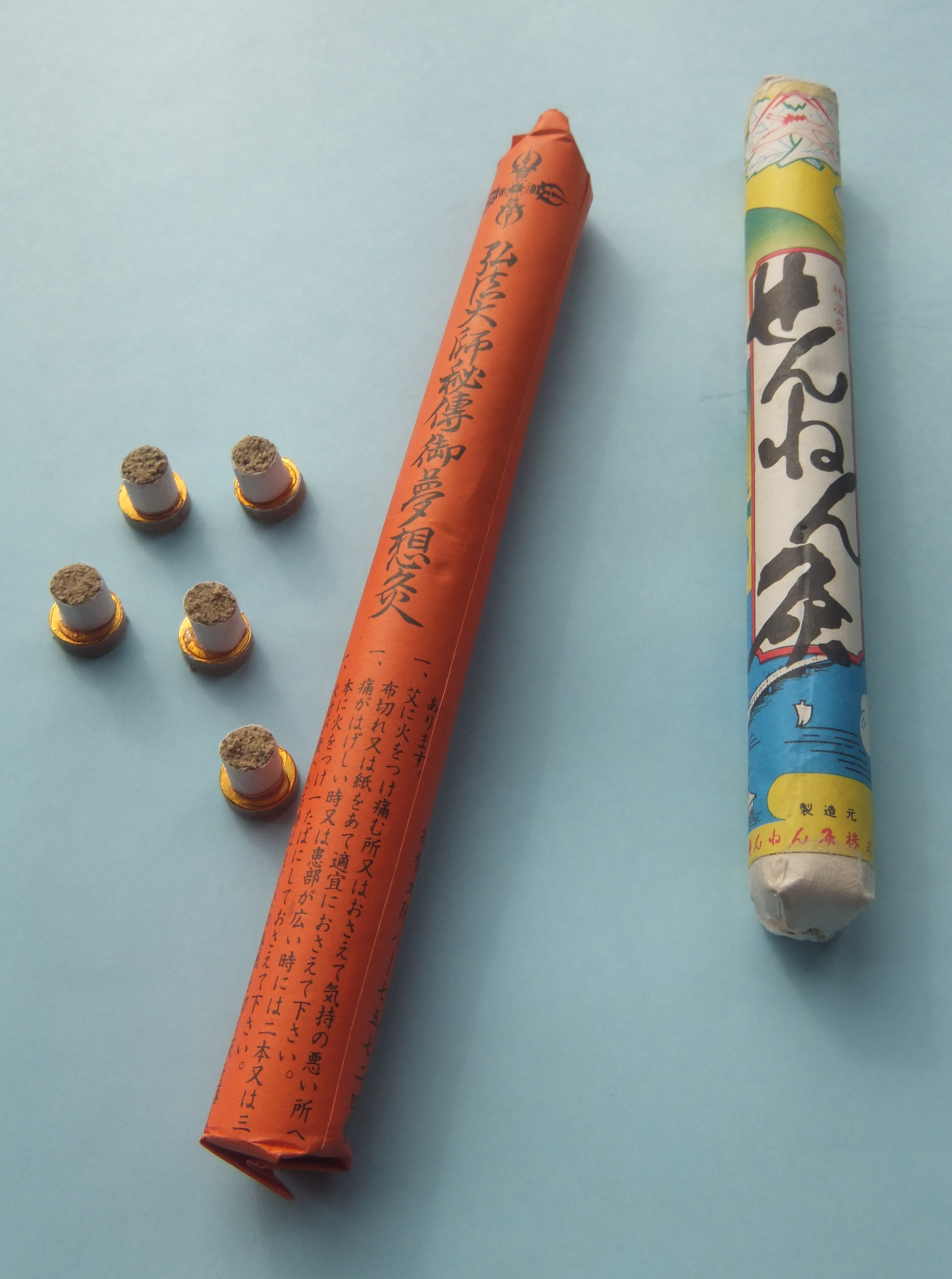
Stick-on moxa (left) and moxa rolls (right) used for indirect moxa heat treatment. The stick-on moxa is a modern product sold in Japan, Korea, and China. Usually the base is self-adhesive to the treatment point.

== Theory and practice ==
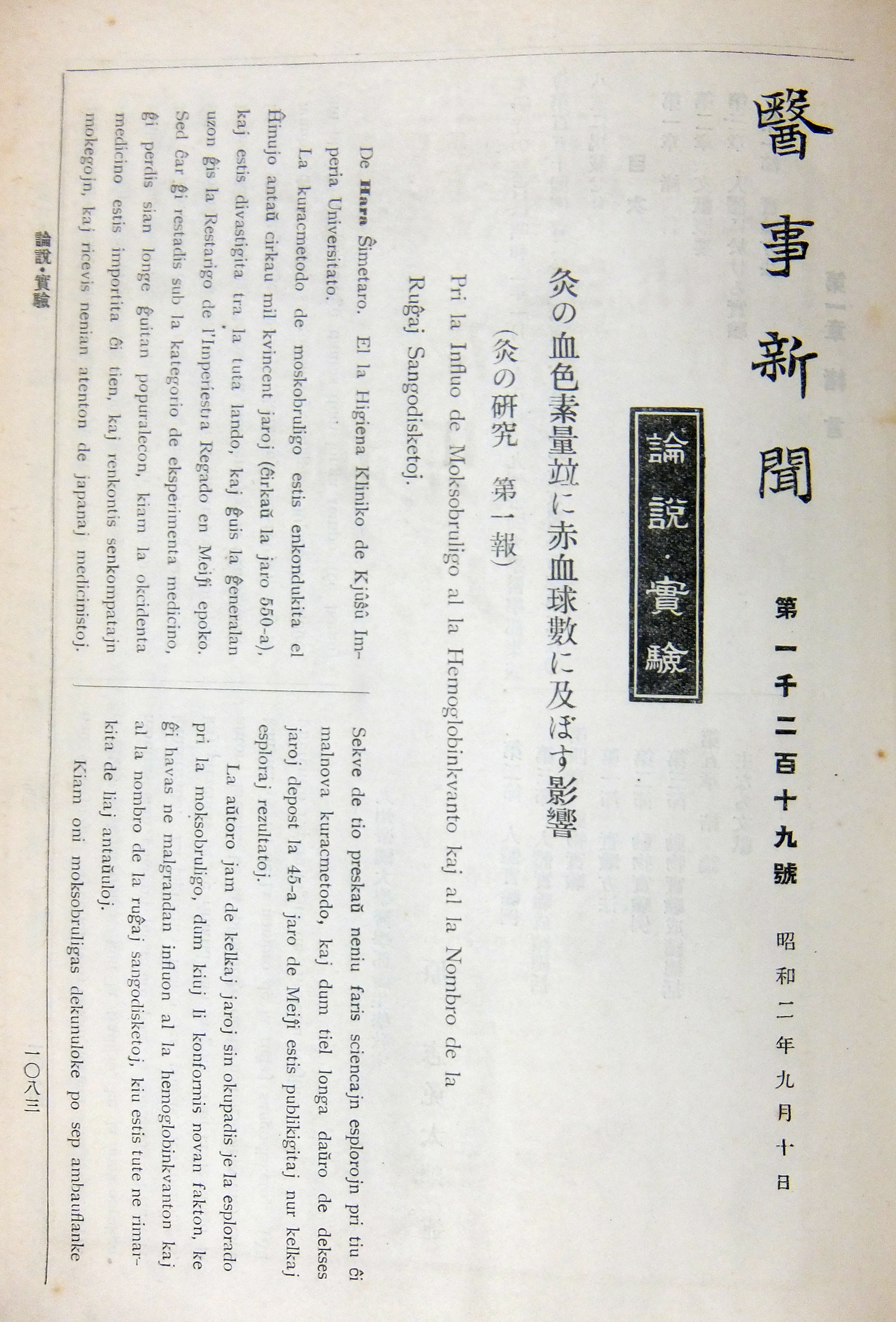
First page of Shimetarō Hara: "Effects of Moxa on hemoglobin and RBC count". Iji Shinbun, no. 1219, 10 Sept. 1927. (Summary in Esperanto)

Practitioners use moxa to warm regions and meridian points with the intention of stimulating circulation through the points and inducing a smoother flow of blood and qi. Some believe it can treat conditions associated with the "cold" or "yang deficiencies" in Chinese medicine. It is claimed that moxibustion mitigates against cold and dampness in the body, and can be used to treat lymphedema following intrapelvic lymph node dissection, and help turn breech babies.

Practitioners claim moxibustion to be especially effective in the treatment of chronic problems, "deficient conditions" (weakness), and gerontology. Bian Que (fl. circa 500 BCE), one of the most famous semi-legendary doctors of Chinese antiquity and the first specialist in moxibustion, discussed the benefits of moxa over acupuncture in his classic work Bian Que Neijing. He asserted that moxa could add new energy to the body and could treat both excess and deficient conditions.

Practitioners may use acupuncture needles made of various materials in combination with moxa, depending on the direction of qi flow they wish to stimulate.

There are several methods of moxibustion. Three of them are direct scarring, direct non-scarring, and indirect moxibustion. Direct scarring moxibustion places a small cone of moxa on the skin at an acupuncture point and burns it until the skin blisters, which then scars after it heals. Direct non-scarring moxibustion removes the burning moxa before the skin burns enough to scar, unless the burning moxa is left on the skin too long. Indirect moxibustion holds a cigar made of moxa near the acupuncture point to heat the skin, or holds it on an acupuncture needle inserted in the skin to heat the needle. There is also stick-on moxa.

Chuanwu lingji lu (the Record of Sovereign Teachings), by Zhang Youheng, was a treatise on acu-moxa completed in 1869 and featuring several colour illustrations of the points on the body where moxa could be applied to treat the complaint.

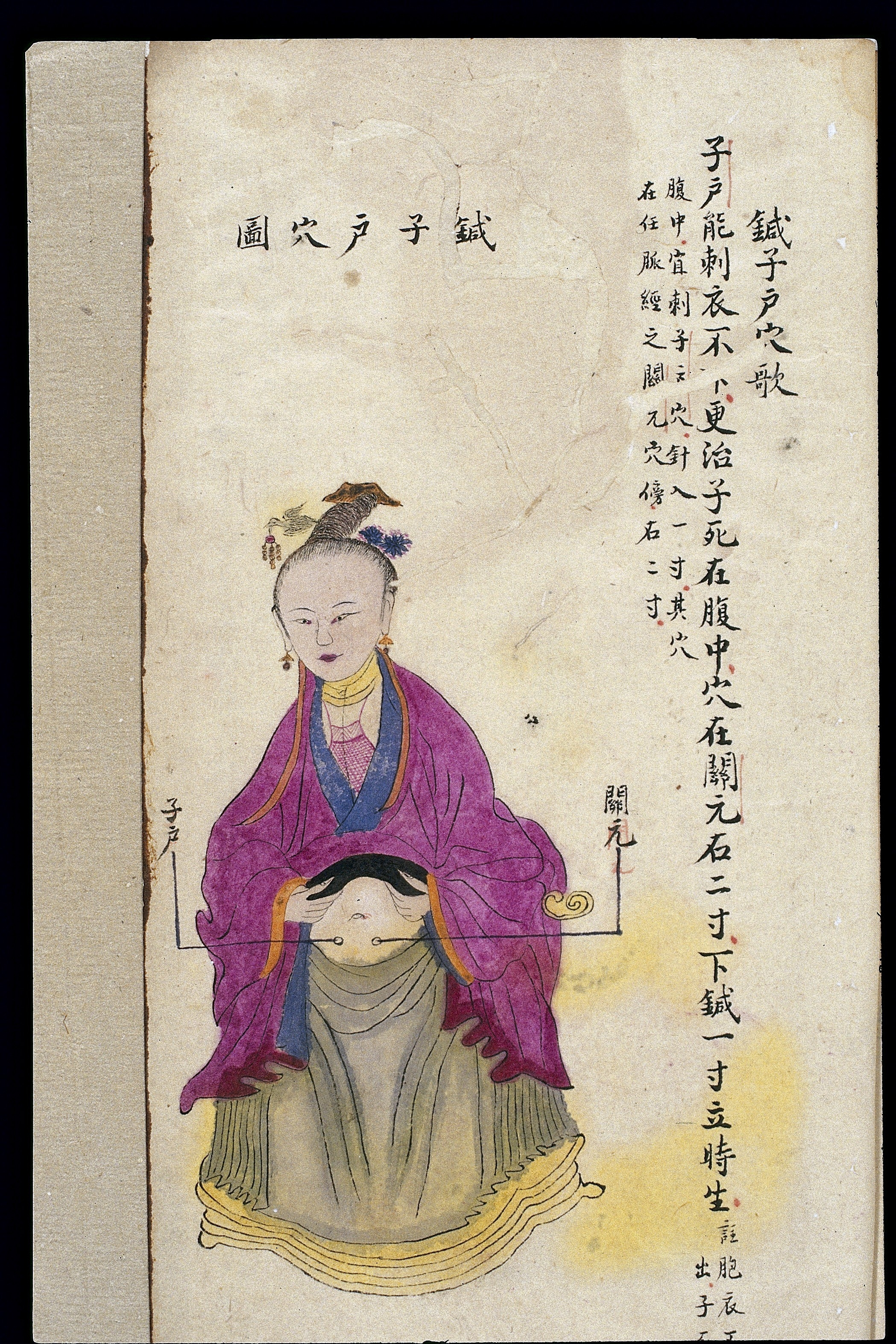
The cervix point was used to treat retained placenta and intrauterine death.

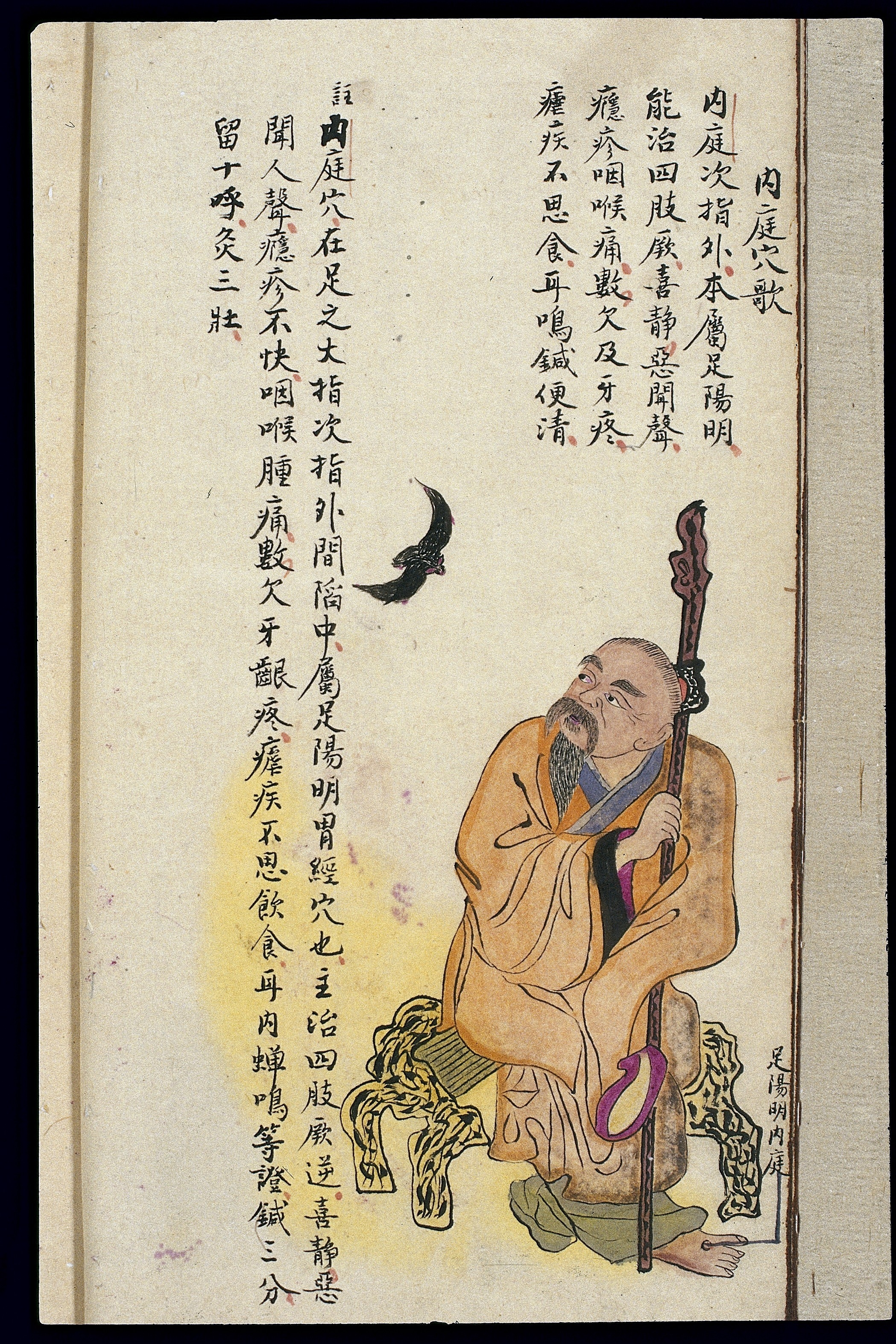
The Neiting point was used to remedy retrograde cold (jueni) in the limbs; aversion to noise; profuse breakout of pox; painful, inflamed throats; unremitting toothache; yawning and somnolence; lack of appetite for food and drink; tinnitus (lit. cricket chirp [chanming] in the ear); ague (nüeji), etc.

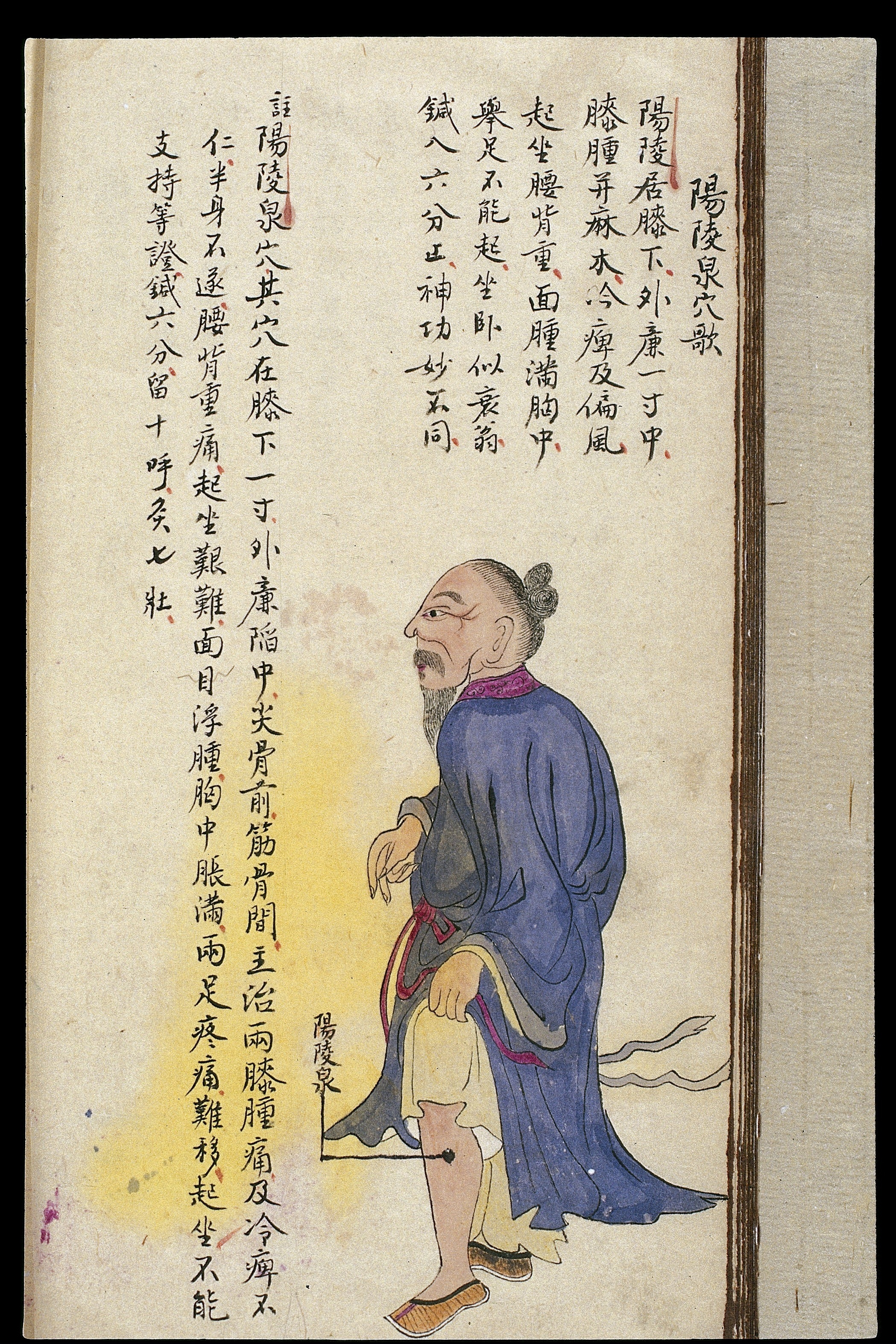
The Yanglingquan point was used to treat pain and swelling in the feet and knees; wind-cold-damp blockage disease (bi); one-sided paralysis; heavy, aching feeling in the back, making it difficult to sit or stand; facial oedema (fuzhong); distention and feeling of fullness (zhangman) in the chest, etc.

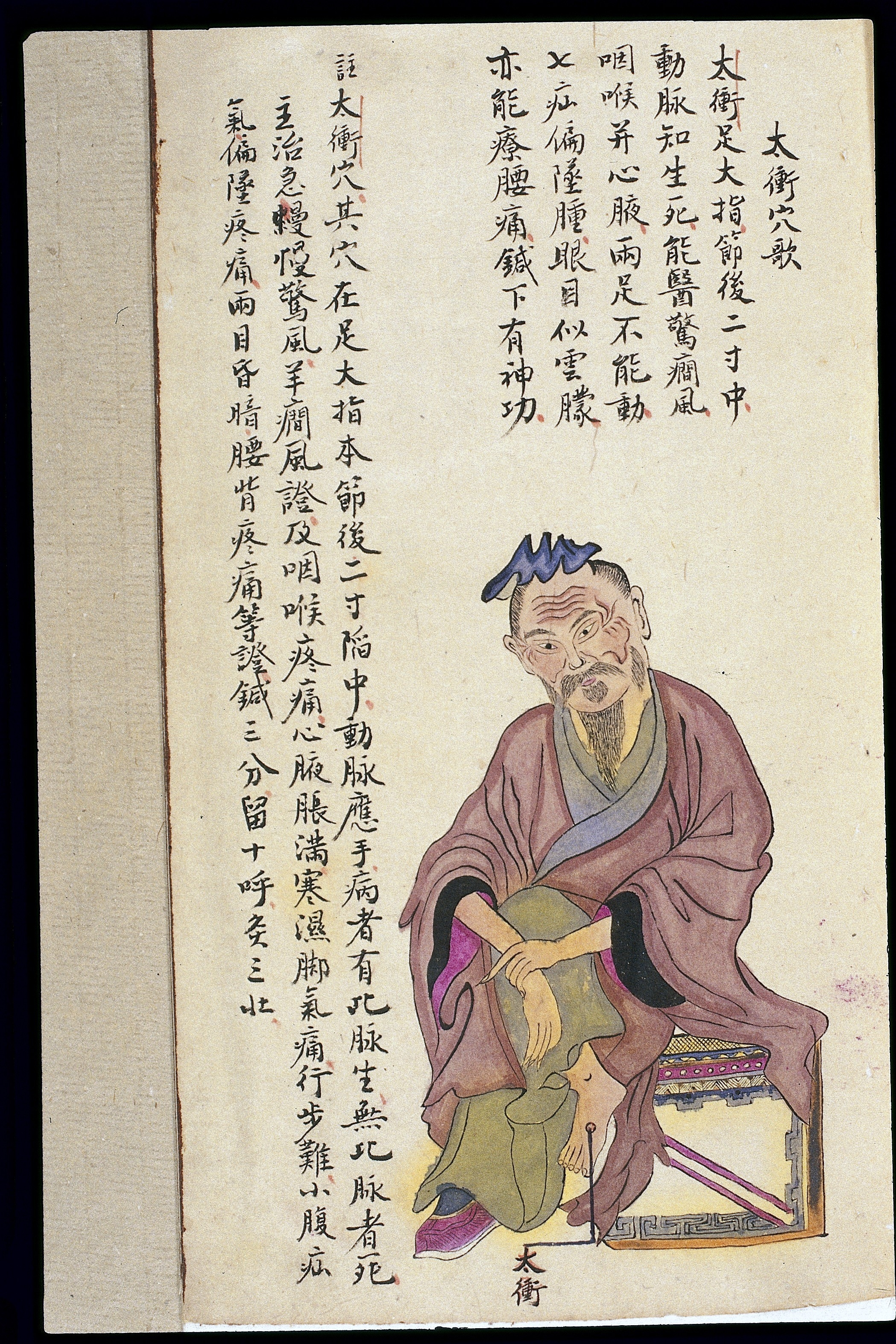
The Taichong point was indicated for acute and chronic infantile convulsions (lit. wind fright, jingfeng); epilepsy (dianxian) and spasms; sore throat; distention and feeling of fullness (zhangman) in the chest and sides; cold-damp beri-beri (jiaoqi); difficulty in walking; hernia (shanqi); dim vision; backache, etc.

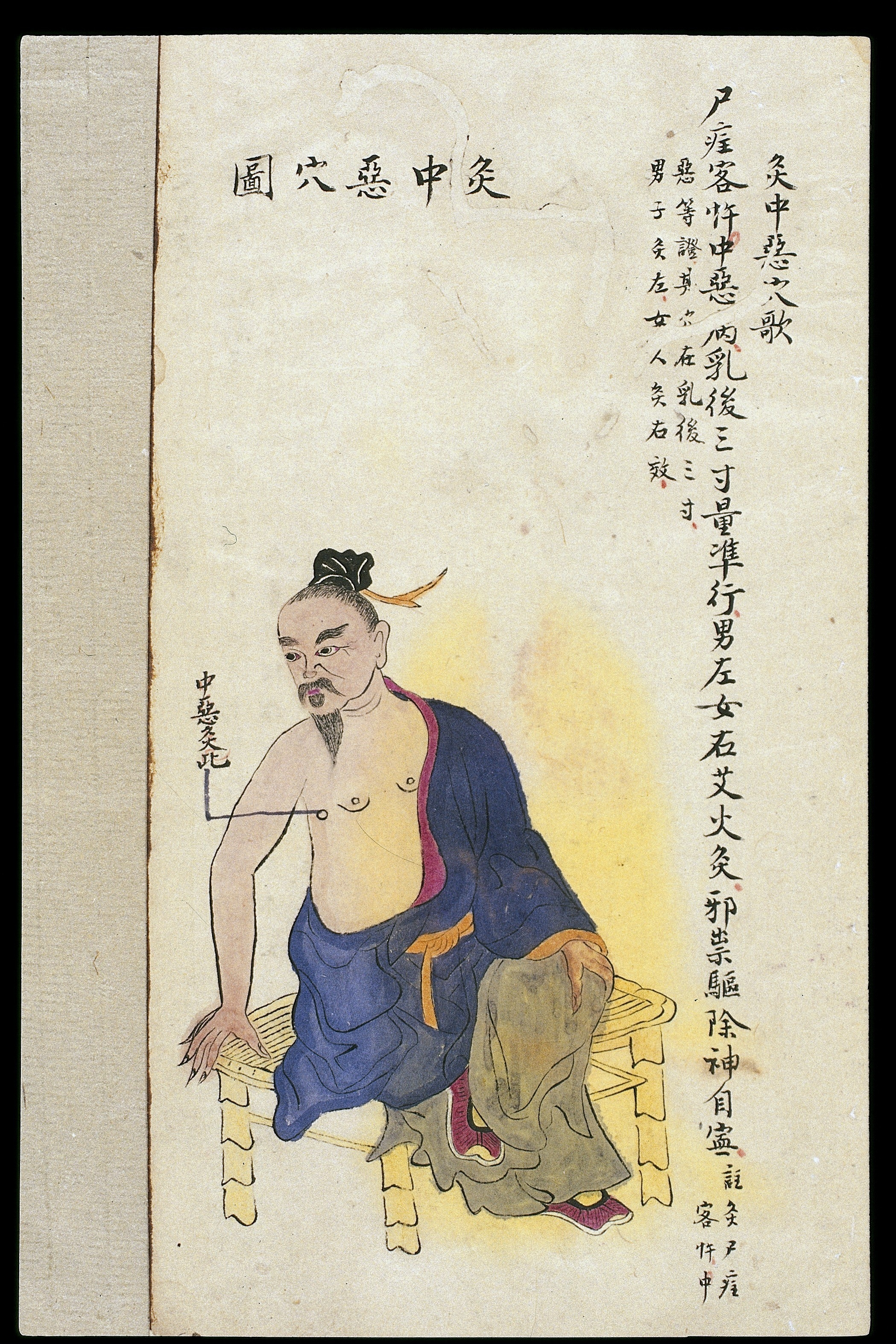
The zhong 'e point was targeted for corpse infection (shizhu) and inimical visitation (kewu), malign attack (zhong 'e) [forms of demonic possession], etc. Moxibustion takes place on the left for male patients and the right for female patients.

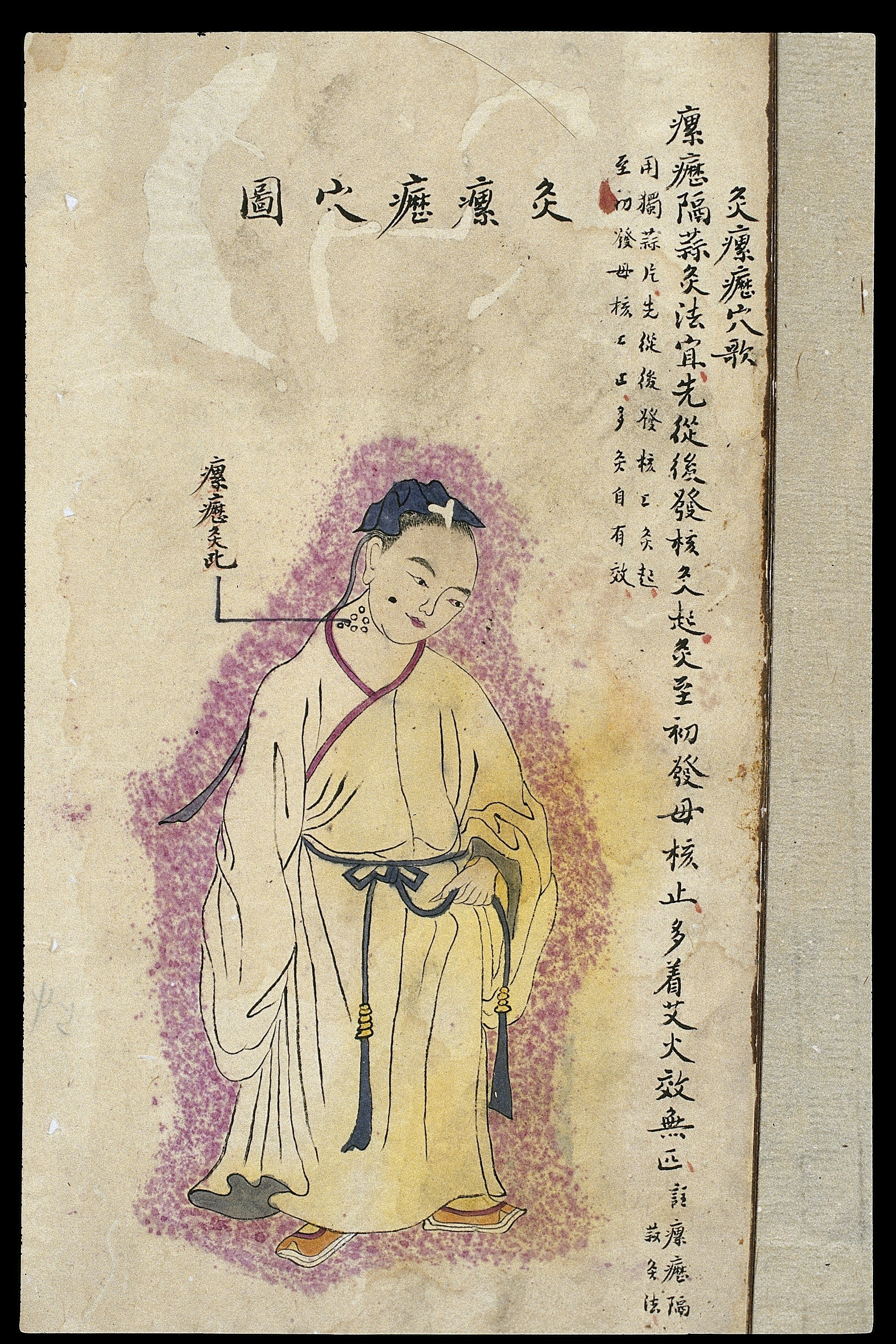
Scrofula was to be treated at the point where it occurred, with garlic-partition moxibustion (gesuan jiufa).

== Uses and effectiveness ==
Most research into moxibustion comes from China and is generally of low quality. Claims are made for its effectiveness for a wide variety of conditions, with some practitioners promoting it as a panacea.

=== Pregnancy ===
There is some evidence to suggest that moxibustion, when included along with other procedures that are usual to care for a person who is at risk of a breech birth, may decrease the chances that the baby presents in the breech position and may decrease the chances of a person requiring oxytocin to help labour start or progress. This evidence is considered to be of the "moderate" level of certainty by a 2023 Cochrane Systematic Review, however, the safety profile was not clear in these studies as adverse effects were not well considered or properly reported. In addition, the need or role of turning the baby by performing an external cephalic version to prevent a breech birth along with these treatments is not known. There is no evidence that moxibustion, when combined with standard care practices, helps reduce the risk of a person requiring a caesarean section. It is also not clear if there are any benefits for preventing early membrane ruptures or a protective effect on the umbilical cord blood pH level.

=== Other ===
Moxibustion has also been studied for the treatment of pain, cancer, stroke, ulcerative colitis, constipation, and hypertension. Systematic reviews have found that these studies are of low quality and positive findings could be due to publication bias.

== Adverse effects ==
Moxibustion carries a risk of adverse effects including burns and infection. Some side effects that have been reported include nausea, throat irritation, and abdominal pain from contractions when used in pregnancy.

== Parallel uses of mugwort ==
Mugwort amongst other herbs was often bound into smudge sticks. The Chumash people from southern California have a similar ritual. Europeans placed sprigs of mugwort under pillows to provoke dreams; and the herb had associations with the practice of magic in Anglo-Saxon times.

== See also ==
- Acupuncture – Pseudoscientific needling treatment
  - Fire needle acupuncture
- Cupping therapy – Pseudoscience whereby suction is applied to the skin
- Traditional Chinese medicine – Alternative medicine category
- Jieba – Ritual scars on Buddhist monks
- Electric moxa – Treatment device designed by Golding Bird
