= Acupuncture in Medicine =

Acupuncture in Medlicine
- Discipline: Acupuncture
- Language: English
- Edited by: David Coggin-Carr

Publication details
- History: 1982–present
- Publisher: SAGE Publishing (United Kingdom)
- Frequency: Bi-monthly
- Impact factor: 2.267 (2020)

Standard abbreviations
- ISO 4: Acupunct. Med.

Indexing
- CODEN: ACMEFP
- ISSN: 0964-5284 (print); 1759-9873 (web)
- OCLC no.: 21477249

Links
- Journal homepage; Online access; Online archive

Acupuncture in Medicine is a bi-monthly peer-reviewed medical journal covering aspects of acupuncture and related techniques. The journal was established in 1982 by the British Medical Acupuncture Society, but was published by the BMJ Group on behalf of the Society from 2008 to 2018 and SAGE Publishing from 2019. The current editor-in-chief is David Coggin-Carr (University of Vermont).

In an opinion piece for Forbes magazine that focused on pseudoscientific journals that were produced by reputable publishers, Steven Salzberg listed this journal, alongside Journal of Acupuncture and Meridian Studies (published by Elsevier) and Chinese Medicine (published by BioMed Central), as examples of "fake medical journals"; his critique was repeated in an article written for Monthly Index of Medical Specialities exploring whether acupuncture was a medical sham or genuine treatment.

When the BMJ Group started to publish the journal in 2008, David Colquhoun criticized the group for endorsing acupuncture "at a time when it is emerging that the evidence for any specific effect is very thin indeed." While he gave credit to BMJ Group and Acupuncture in Medicine for not espousing "the mumbo-jumbo about 'meridians' and 'Qi'", he also noted: "like all journals devoted to alternative medicine [Acupuncture in Medicine] suffers from a fatal conflict of interest. If this journal were ever to conclude that acupuncture is a placebo, it would destroy the journal and the livelihoods of many of the people who write for it."

== Abstracting and indexing ==
The journal is abstracted and indexed in CINAHL, Current Contents/Clinical Medicine, Embase, Index Medicus/MEDLINE/PubMed, Science Citation Index Expanded, and Scopus. According to the Journal Citation Reports, the journal has a 2020 impact factor of 2.267, ranking 17th of out 29 in the category "Integrative & Complementary Medicine".
