= Emperor's College of Traditional Oriental Medicine =

Educational institution in Culver City, California, USA

Coordinates: 34°1′49″N 118°29′5″W

Emperor's College
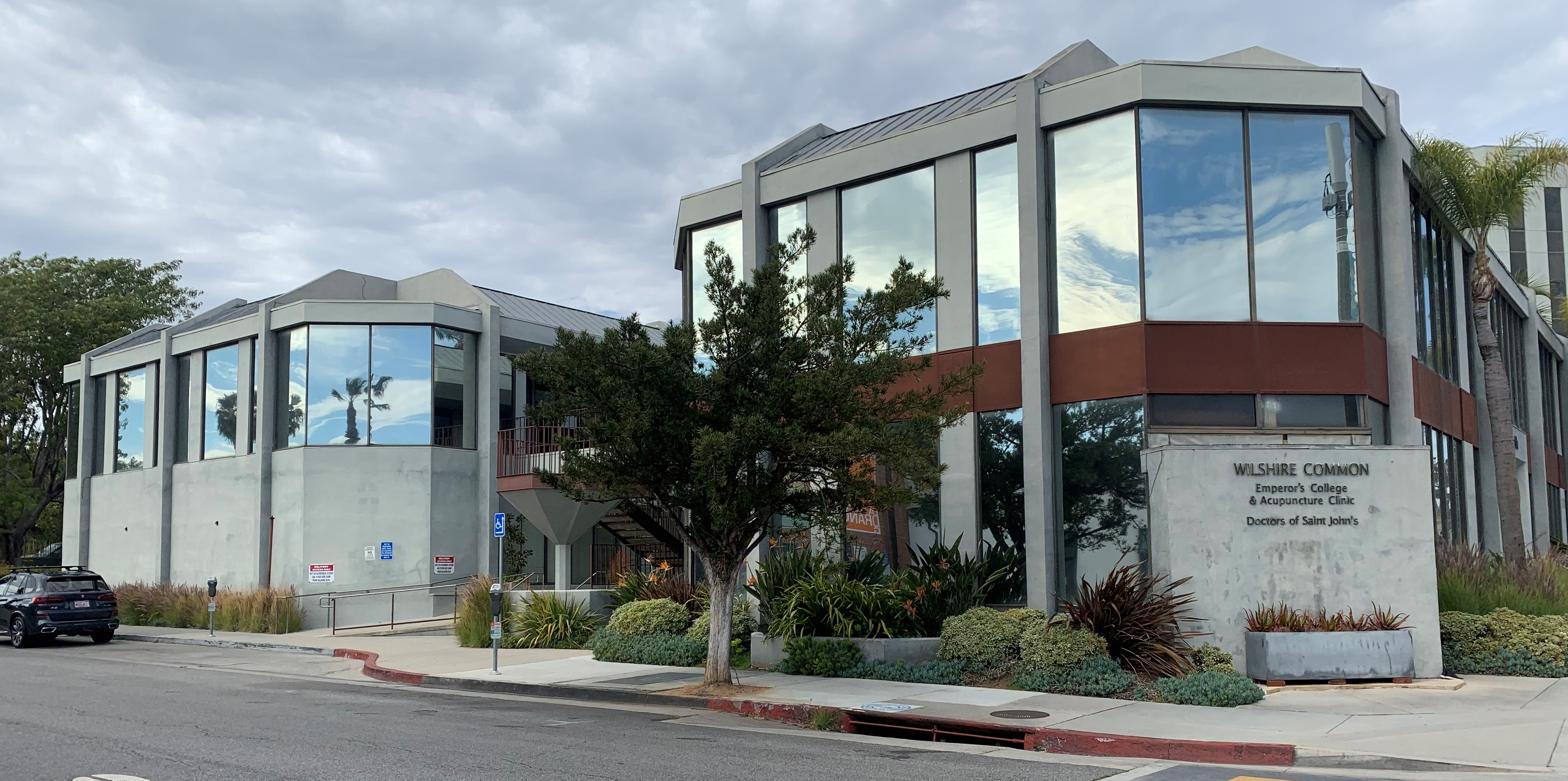
- Type: Private for-profit graduate school
- Established: 1983
- President: Yun Kim
- Location: Culver City, California, U.S.
- Campus: Urban
- Colors: Teal and gold
- Website: www.emperors.edu

Emperor's College was a private for-profit graduate school of traditional Asian medicine in Culver City, California. Founded in 1983, it offered master's and doctoral programs with accreditation in acupuncture and Asian medicine. It closed on June 30, 2025.

== Academics ==
The college offered two (2) degrees:

- Masters of Acupuncture and Herbal Medicine: The Master of Acupuncture and Herbal Medicine (MAHM) degree at Emperor's College was accredited by the Accreditation Commission for Acupuncture and Herbal Medicine (ACAHM) which is the accrediting agency recognized by the U.S. Department of Education for the approval of programs preparing acupuncture and Oriental medicine practitioners.
- Doctorate of Acupuncture and Oriental Medicine: The Doctor of Acupuncture and Oriental Medicine (DAOM) program at Emperor's College was accredited by the Accreditation Commission for Acupuncture and Herbal Medicine (ACAHM) which is the accrediting agency recognized by the U.S. Department of Education for the approval of programs preparing acupuncture and Asian medicine practitioners.

Emperor's College was licensed to operate by the California Bureau for Private Postsecondary Education and graduates of the MAHM program are eligible to sit for the California Acupuncture Licensing Examination. Emperor's MAHM program also meets the licensure requirements of most states that license practitioners of acupuncture and Asian medicine. Graduates of the master's program are also eligible to sit for the NCCAOM examination and become certified by the National Certification Commission for Acupuncture and Oriental Medicine.

== History ==
1983 Emperor's College is established.

1989 Receives Acupuncture and Asian Medicine national accreditation.

1997 Partners with a hospital to allow interns to treat acute care patients at Daniel Freeman Hospital in Los Angeles.

1999 Partners with UCLA Arthur Ashe Student Health and Wellness Center.

2000 Emperor's College clinicians participate in acupuncture research trials with Cedars Sinai Hospital post-cardiac surgical patients, and with USC Keck School of Medicine in stroke research.

2004 Establishes Doctorate in Acupuncture and Oriental Medicine.

2006 Doctoral Program is awarded a research grant to study effects of acupuncture on quality of care and cost of hospitalization with Good Samaritan Hospital Acute Rehabilitation Unit.

2009 Doctoral Program is granted accreditation candidacy by ACAHM.

2011 Partners with The Roy and Patricia Disney Family Cancer Center.

2011 Stroke Rehabilitation and Dementia Care Clinic launches at Emperor's College Acupuncture Clinic

2014 Partners with BeingAlive!LA, and launches acupuncture clinic for HIV+ individuals at their West Hollywood Offices.

2015 Serves as a health and wellness provider for the Special Olympic World Games in Los Angeles.

2015 Treats unhoused vets at the 2015 Los Angeles Veteran and Families Stand Down, the largest event of its kind in the United States.

2022 Signs an academic affiliation agreement with the Greater Los Angeles VA.

2023 Establishes the PTSD Clinic for veterans at the Greater Los Angeles VA.

2025 Emperor's College announces its closure after 43 years of operation, effective June 30, 2025.
