= Fire needle acupuncture =

Fire needle acupuncture also known as fire needling is an acupuncture technique that involves quickly inserting a red hot needle into acupuncture points on the body. Deep insertions result in greater pain and other side effects. Fire needling combines conventional acupuncture and cauterization with heated needles.

The technique has been used since ancient times, when it was called "puncturing with a red-hot needle".

== Technique ==
The method is based on Chinese medicinal belief of meridian. Heated needles are applied on ashi points.
