= Bian stones =

Part of traditional Chinese medicine

Bian stones are pointed stones that were historically used in traditional Chinese medicine. They are generally considered to be a precursor to acupuncture, utilizing heated pointed stones rather than acupuncture needles in the treatment of back and neck pain. The stones are made from a variety of materials found along the river Si region of Shandong, China.

== History ==
Bian stone therapy is one of humanity's oldest medical practices. The Bian-stone technique refers to the use of stone-based equipment to perform massaging, heating, and other operations. The devices are called bian stone tools. Bian-stone includes both the bian-stone technique and the tool. When used in medical institutions for therapeutic purposes, it is referred to as Bian-stone treatment.

Before acupuncture and moxibustion appeared, ancient Chinese people selected certain kinds of stone and ground it into a therapeutic tool that featured a sharp tip or an edge. Such shapes allowed the stone to be applied to the human body in different ways. The puncturing and pressing methods eventually evolved into acupuncture, while the heated-stone application evolved into moxibustion. A classic book notes that bian-stone treatment originated in the east of China, but moxibustion came from the North, where people had to warm themselves by fire.

Known by three names - Needle Stone, Arrow-headed Stone, and Bian Stone - these stones were used in primitive society as a special medicinal tool. Excavations of New Stone Age ruins in Asia recovered multiple Bian-stone needles of varying lengths from multiple locations. The recovered stone needles have different ends for different procedures, including blood-letting, qi (energy) regulation, and incising.

This technique disappeared during the Han Dynasty, due to the introduction and use of iron. The source of the material for making Bian-stone has been identified as Sibin Floating Stone. Bian stone appliances have since been devised and developed and therapeutic techniques explored.

Bian-stone is the first technique among the four major ancient medical practices of the “Yellow Emperor” (they are: Bian-stone, Acupuncture, moxibustion, herbs/drugs.)

== Influence ==
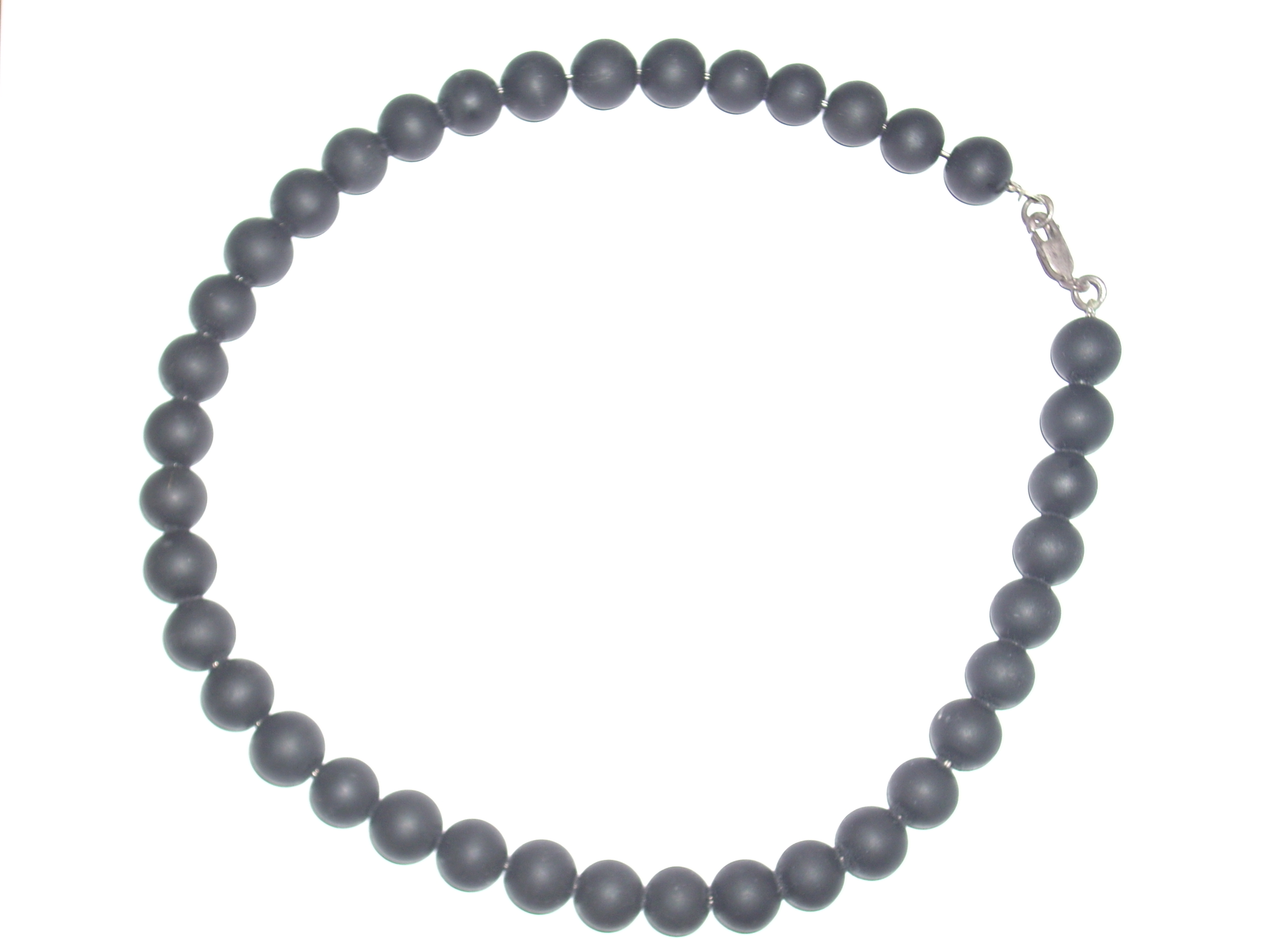
Bian stone necklace.

Bian stone has been applied in Traditional Chinese Medicine for various soft tissue injuries, especially, cervical spondylosis, acute or chronic lower back pain, as well as skin disorders, such as abscesses or boils, and regulating qi and blood circulation.

== Clinical practice ==
Therapy usually begins with a traditional Chinese massage to open up the body's meridians, followed by a series of Bian stone treatments with pre-heated bian stone. This therapy can be coupled with other traditional Chinese medicine therapy, such as acupuncture, or cupping to achieve the optimal effect on cervical vertebra disease.
