= Hand acupuncture =

Koryo hand acupuncture is a modern system of acupuncture, created by Yu Tae-u in the 1970s, in which the hand represents the entire body and is needled or stimulated during treatment. Koryo hand acupuncture is popular among the general population as a form of self-medication in Korea, and has adherents in Japan and North America; it is also popular among overseas Koreans. Korean hand acupuncture is different from American hand reflexology, another form of alternative medicine. One of the main differences between the two forms of alternative therapies is that they each use a different hand microsystem, which is the idea that specific areas of the hand correspond to specific areas of the body. Korean hand acupuncturists believe the entire body can be mapped on each hand, whereas their Western counterparts believe each hand represents only one side of the body.
