= Journal of Acupuncture and Meridian Studies =

- Discipline: Alternative medicine
- Language: English
- Edited by: Pan Dong Ryu

Publication details
- History: 2008-present
- Publisher: Elsevier on behalf of the Medical Association of Pharmacopuncture Institute
- Frequency: Bimonthly
- Open access: Yes

Standard abbreviations
- ISO 4: J. Acupunct. Meridian Stud.

Indexing
- ISSN: 2005-2901 (print); 2093-8152 (web)

Links
- Journal homepage; Online access; Online archive; Journal page at publisher's website

The Journal of Acupuncture and Meridian Studies is a bimonthly medical journal covering research related to acupuncture, the meridian system (a concept in traditional Chinese medicine for which no evidence exists that supports its existence), and related treatments. It was established in 2008 and is published by Elsevier on behalf of the Medical Association of Pharmacopuncture Institute. The editors-in-chief are Pan Dong Ryu and Kwang-Sup Soh (Seoul National University). In an opinion piece for Forbes on journals about pseudoscience published by reputable publishers, Steven Salzberg listed this journal as one of the examples of a "fake medical journal", and his critique was repeated in an article written for Monthly Index of Medical Specialities exploring whether acupuncture was a medical sham or genuine treatment.

Research published by the journal was used as an object lesson by New Zealand consumer advocate Mark Hanna illustrating the problems with the lack of scientific veracity in studies of acupuncture:

The existence of qi and meridians is not supported by any evidence, and when this practice was developed it was based more on philosophy than evidence. In that way, it's similar to extinct medical philosophies such as the "Western" medical philosophy of humorism.

One aspect of acupuncture that I find illustrates quite well the fact that its development was not supported by evidence is that horses are said to have a gall bladder meridian. This gall bladder meridian has even been the subject of published papers in journals such as the "Journal of Acupuncture and Meridian Studies". What's so odd about that, though? Horses don't have a gall bladder.

== Abstracting and indexing ==
The journal is abstracted and indexed in:

- CINAHL
- EMBASE
- Emerging Sources Citation Index
- Index Medicus/MEDLINE/PubMed
- Korea Citation Index
- Scopus
