= Paul Nogier =

French neurologist and physician

Paul Nogier (3 July 1908 – 15 May 1996) was a French neurologist and physician who invented auriculotherapy, a version of acupuncture.

== Nogier's discoveries ==
=== Auriculotherapy ===
In 1957, Nogier first presented his observations of the somatotopic correspondences of the ear, in which the external ear anatomically corresponds to an inverted fetus—the homunculus.

=== Nogier's pulse ===
Nogier claimed that there was a change in the amplitude and dimension of the patient's radial pulse when certain points on the auricle were stimulated. He called this the Nogier's pulse or Vascular Automonic Sign (VAS).

=== Nogier's frequencies ===
In the 1970s, Nogier developed seven frequencies A through G which he routinely used in medical practice for diagnosis and treatment. In his practice, these frequencies are preferentially recognized by the body, so they enter into resonance to exert effects on the body.

== See also ==
- Auriculotherapy
