= Willem ten Rhijne =

17th-century Dutch physician and botanist (1647–1700)

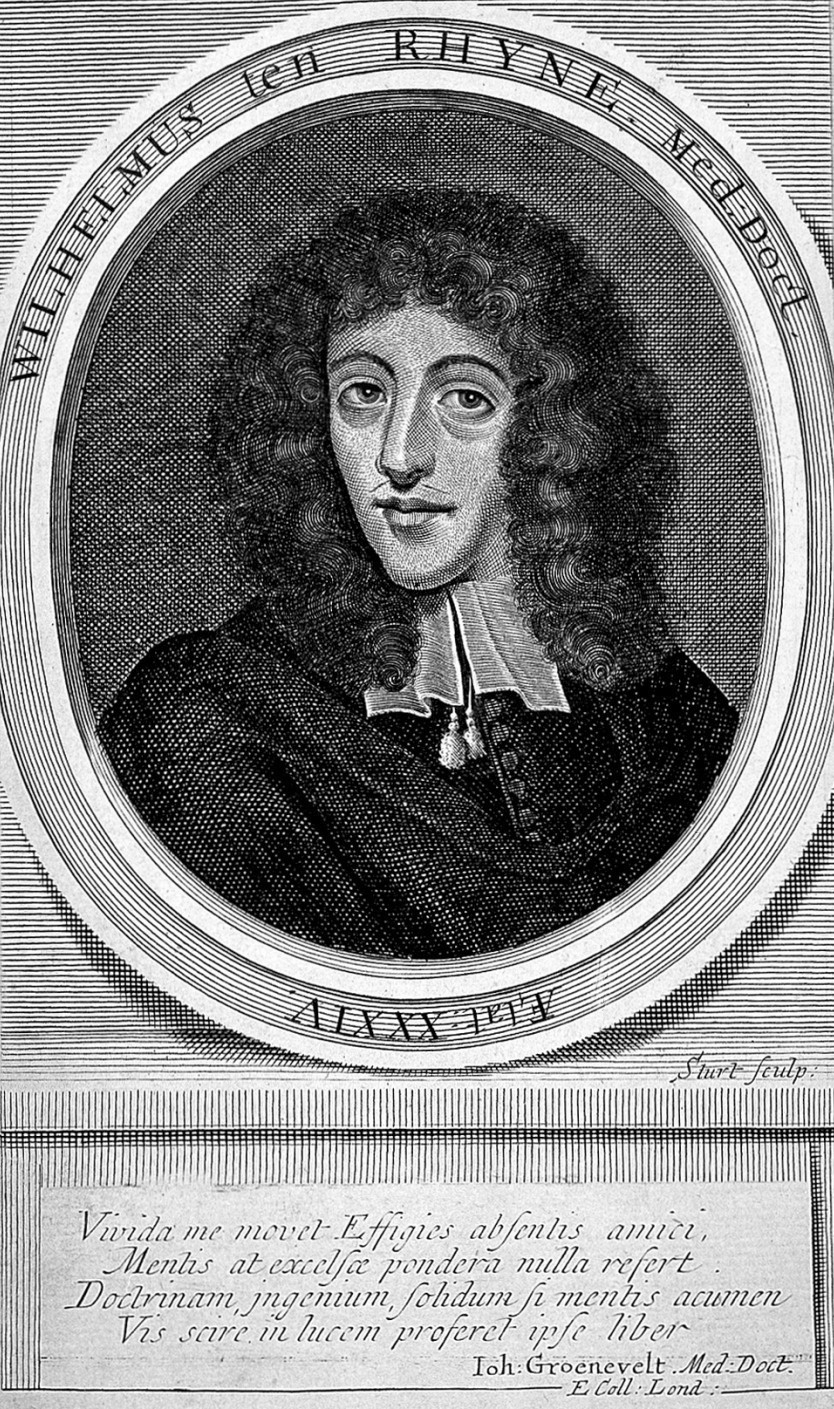
Willem ten Rhijne (Frontispiece by John Sturt in "Dissertatio de Arthritide ..." (1683)

Willem ten Rhijne (1647, Deventer – 1 June 1700, Batavia) was a Dutch doctor and botanist who was employed by the Dutch East India Company in 1673. In summer 1674 he was dispatched to the trading post Dejima in Japan. While giving medical instructions and taking care of high-ranking Japanese patients, ten Rhijne collected materials on Japanese medicine, especially on acupuncture and moxibustion.

In autumn 1676 he returned to Batavia where he continued to serve as a physician. In 1683 he published a book entitled "Dissertatio de Arthritide: Mantissa Schematica: De Acupunctura: Et Orationes Tres". His treatise on the art of needling which he called acupunctura was the first Western detailed study on that matter. He also wrote An Account of the Cape of Good Hope and the Hottentotes, which describes the lives of the Khoikhoi (then Hottentots) during the early days of Dutch settlement in the Cape as well as a pioneering book on Leprosy in Asia (Dutch: Asiatise Melaatsheid) and a treatise on tea that was published by Jakob Breyne.

== Works ==
- Disputatio medica de dolore intestinorum a flatu […] publicae medicorum disquisitioni subjicit Wilhelmus ten Rhyne […] Præs. F. de le Boe Sylvio. Lugduni Batavorum: apud viduam & haeredes Joannis Elsevirii, 1668
- Exercitatio physiologica in celebrem Hippocratis textum de vet. med. Quam […] sub praesidio […] Francisci de le Boe Sylvii […] publico medicorum examini submittit Wilhelmus ten Rhyne […] ad diem [ ] Iunii, loco horisque solitis, ante mer. Lugduni Batavorum: apud viduam & haeredes Johannis Elsevirii, 1669.
- Meditationes in magni Hippocratis textum XXIV de veteri medicina quibus traduntur brevis pneumatologia, succincta phytologia, intercalaris chymología &c.; cum additamento & variis hinc inde laciniis de salvium &c. Lugduni Batavorum: apud Johannem à Schuylenburgh, 1672.
- Wilhelmi ten Rhyne Medici, Botanici & Chymici quondam Magni Imperatoris Japonicæ, nunc verò Medicinæ & Anatomiæ Professoris in Batavia Emporio Indiæ Orientalis celeberrimo Excerpta ex observationibus suis Japonicis Physicis &c. de Fructice Thee. Cui accedit Fasciculus Rariorum Plantarum ab eodem D.D. ten Rhyne In Promontorio Bonæ Speï et Saldanhâ Sinu Anno MDCLXXIII. collectarum, atque demum ex Indiâ Anno MDCLXXVII. in Europam ad Jacobus Breynium, Gedanensem transmissarum. In: Jacobi Breynii Gedanensis Icones Exoticarum aliarumque Minus Cognitarum Plantarum in Centuria Prima descriptarum Plantae Exoticae. Gedani: Rhetius, 1678 (pp. [VII] – XXV)
- Wilhelmi ten Rhyne M.D. &c. Transisalano-Daventriensis Dissertatio de Arthritide: Mantissa Schematica: De Acupunctura: Et Orationes Tres. I. De Chymiae ac Botaniae antiquitate & dignitage: II. De Psysiognomia: III. De Monstris. Singula ipsius Authoris notis illustrata. Londini: imp. R. Chiswell ad insigne Rosae Corona, 1683.
- Schediasma de promontorio bonae spei eiusque tractus incolis Hottentottis Wilhelmi ten Rhyne Schediasma de promontorio bonae spei eiusque ejusqve tractus incolis Hottentottis accurante, brevesque notas addente Henr. Screta S. a Zavorziz. Scafusii: Meister, 1686. (English trans.: An Account of the Cape of Good Hope and the Hottentotes, the Natives of that Country, 1704)
- Verhandelinge van de Asiatise Melaatsheid na een naaukeuriger ondersoek ten dienste van het gemeen. Amsterdam 1687
