= International Society of Acupuncture =

French research society

The International Society of Acupuncture (Societe Internationale d’Acupuncture, SIA) was an international acupuncture research society, based in Paris, France. It was founded by Roger de La Fuÿe between 1941 and 1943. From 1965 to 1966, SIA published La Revue d'acupuncture. From 1975 to 1977, SIA published Revue de la Société internationale d'acupuncture. In 1977, the Fifth World Conference of Acupuncture of SIA was organized by the Japan Society of Medical Acupuncture and the Japan Acupuncture and Moxibustion Society.

In addition to research, SIA was a degree-granting institution.

SIA has been reported to be inactive by various institutions. Estimates for the cessation of activity vary: 1984, and 1996 have both been given.
