= Auriculotherapy =

Pseudoscientific ear stimulation treatment

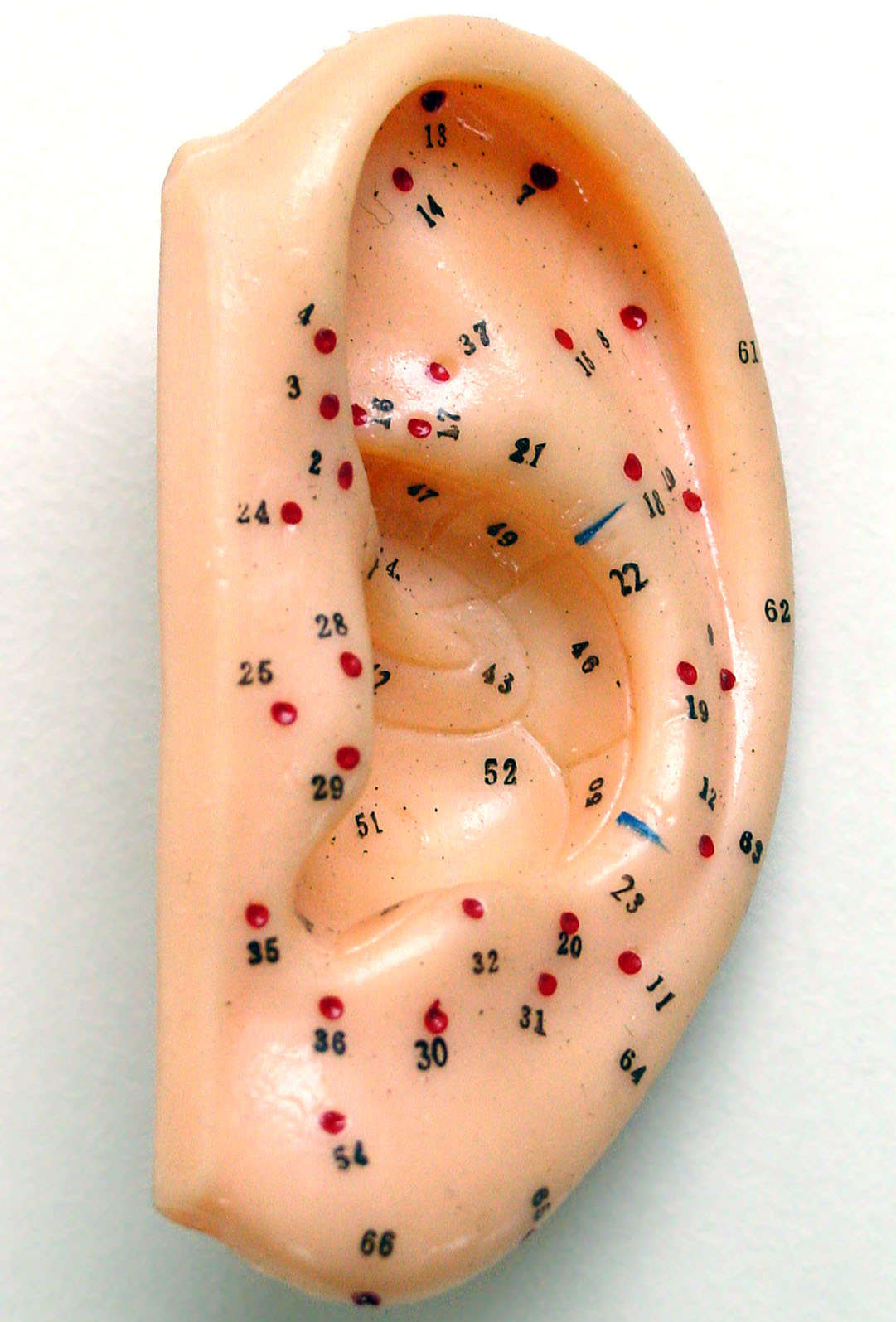
- Acupuncture points in the ear

Alternative therapy

Auriculotherapy (also auricular therapy, ear acupuncture, and auriculoacupuncture) is a form of alternative medicine based on the idea that the ear is a micro system and an external organ, which reflects the entire body, represented on the auricle, the outer portion of the ear. Conditions affecting the person's physical, mental, or emotional health are assumed to be treatable by stimulating the surface of the ear exclusively. Similar mappings are used by several modalities, including the practices of reflexology and iridology. These mappings are not based on or supported by any medical or scientific evidence, and are therefore considered to be pseudoscience.

== History and development ==
French neurologist Paul Nogier invented auriculotherapy in 1957. Nogier developed a phrenological method of projection of a fetal Homunculus on the ear and published what he called the "Vascular Autonomic Signal" which measured a change in the amplitude of the pulse. That mechanism would only produce a signal upon the introduction of new information to the electromagnetic field of the patient. Nogier cited a 'principle of matching resonance' which he could use the vascular autonomic signal to detect the active points of the auricular microsystem.

Nogier's Auricular acupuncture was introduced to China in 1958.

A variation of auriculotherapy called "ear stapling" involves the long-term insertion of a medical staple in the conchal bowl of the ear. Advocates variously claim that the procedure aids in losing weight, stopping smoking, and managing stress.

== Battlefield acupuncture ==
In 2001, Richard Niemtzow developed a procedure he called "battlefield acupuncture", in an attempt to research more efficient relief for phantom limb pain and chronic pain for veterans. Battlefield Acupuncture involves placing gold aiguille semi-permanent needles at up to five sites in the ears. In 2018, the United States Department of Defense, the Veterans Center for Integrative Pain Management, and the Veterans Health Administration National Pain Management Program office completed a 3-year, $5.4 million acupuncture education and training program, which trained over 2800 providers in Battlefield Acupuncture. Retired U.S. Air Force flight surgeon Harriet Hall characterized the Department of Defense's use of acupuncture and auriculotherapy as an embarrassing "infiltration of quackery into military medicine", a waste of tax dollars, and a potential harm to patients.

== Nogier points ==
The principles of auriculotherapy are contrary to the known anatomy and physiology of the human body. According to Nogier, the relevant structures include:

- Helix, the outer prominent rim of the auricle
- Antihelix, the elevated ridge anterior and parallel to the helix
- Triangular fossa, a triangular depression
- Scapha, the narrow curved depression between the helix and the antihelix
- Tragus, the small, curved flap in front of the auricle
- Antitragus, the small tubercle opposite to the tragus
- Concha, the hollow next to the ear canal

Nogier claims that various points located on the ear lobe are related to the head, and facial region, those on the scapha are related to the upper limbs, those on the antihelix and antihelix crura to the trunk and lower limbs and those in the concha are related to the internal organs.

== Chinese auricular acupuncture ==
"Auricular acupuncture therapy is an important part of Traditional Chinese Medicine (TCM), which is ascribed to a kind of micro-needle system. It has been considered to be a valuable asset in the treasure house of Chinese medicine". There are many Chinese medical classics that have the inclusion of Auricular points to treat illness as defined by Chinese medical theory. It was not until the French neurologist Paul Nogier systematically referenced and chartered the points of the ear in the late 1950s. This treatment was extensively researched, developed, and practiced as a modality in East Asia and the West.

== Criticism ==
A controlled crossover study of 36 patients failed to find any difference between the two experiments. The study concluded that auriculotherapy is not an effective therapeutic procedure for chronic pain.

The first experiment compared the effects of stimulation of auriculotherapy points versus control points. A second experiment compared the stimulation of these points with a placebo control of no stimulation. Using the McGill Pain Questionnaire, pain was not decreased at the points compared to the controls. Patients' reports of pain relief after auriculotherapy are due to placebo effects.

Also, during electrical stimulation, patients sometimes reported new pain in an unrelated body part. These referred sensations reinforce the pain relief produced by the placebo effect and may be part of why the belief in auriculotherapy persists.
