= Baunscheidtism =

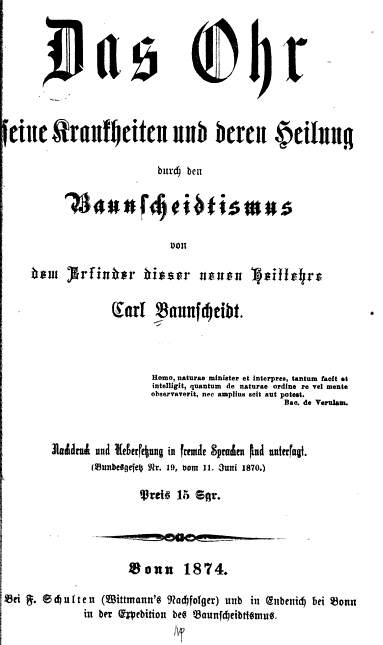
Title page of Das Ohr (The Ear) by Carl Baunscheidt

Baunscheidtism is a form of alternative medicine created in the 19th century. The practice, a form of homeopathy, is named for its founder Carl Baunscheidt (1809–1873), a German mechanic and inventor.

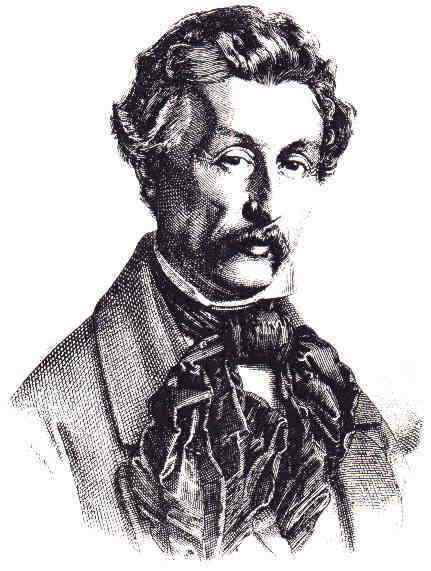
Carl Baunscheidt

The legitimacy of baunscheidtism as an effective medical practice was questioned by at least 1880, when a Melbourne practitioner named Samuel Fischer lost a lawsuit he brought against a patient who failed to pay him, based on the objection that Fischer (a bootmaker) was not a qualified medical practitioner.

== Lebenswecker ==
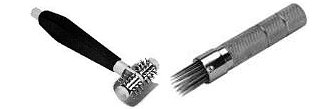
A lebenswecker

The lebenswecker (lit. 'life awakener' in German) or "artificial leech" was a medical device invented by Baunscheidt to pierce the skin with many fine needles. Billed as being able to cure myriad illnesses, the lebenswecker was used on skin treated with toxic oil. The resulting inflammation was alleged to draw the body's attention away from the patient's illness, thus effecting a cure. The diseases that could allegedly be cured with the lebenswecker included whooping cough, baldness, toothaches, and mental disorders. The device's popularity was great enough to support a market for "counterfeit" versions of the lebenswecker that were produced by Baunscheidt.
