= Monthly Index of Medical Specialities =

Pharmaceutical prescribing reference guide

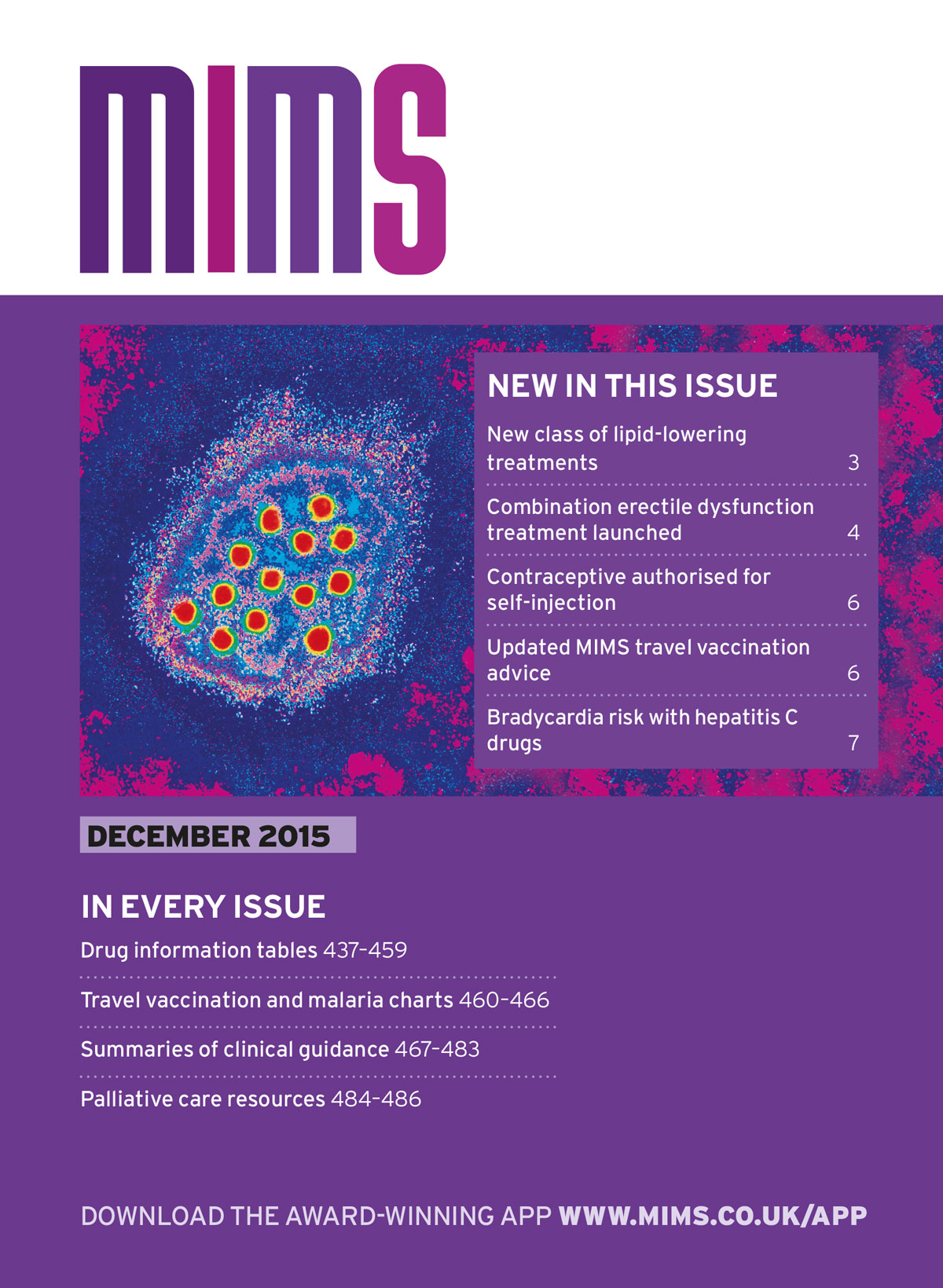
- MIMS Prescribing Guide 50th Anniversary Front Cover.
- Language: English
- Subject: Pharmacology
- Genre: Medical reference
- Publisher: Haymarket Media Group
- Publication date: Quarterly
- Publication place: United Kingdom

The Monthly Index of Medical Specialities or MIMS is a pharmaceutical prescribing reference guide published in the United Kingdom since 1959 by Haymarket Media Group. MIMS is also published internationally by various organizations, including in Australia, New Zealand, China, Hong Kong, India, Indonesia, Japan, Korea, Malaysia, Myanmar, the Philippines, Singapore, Taiwan, UAE Thailand, and Vietnam.

The UK guide contains information about branded and generic drugs in the UK formulary. The print title is published quarterly, freely available to all practice-based UK general practitioners, and on a paid basis to subscribers. An online version is available, with all drug listings available to view for free.

Concise drug monographs form the core of MIMS; these include safety information, details of the active ingredient, presentation, price, indication, dosage and manufacturer. In addition, the book includes drug comparison tables, and summaries of clinical guidance.

Drugs that are blacklisted (not prescribable on the NHS in the UK edition or approved by the TGA in Australia, etc.) or unlicensed are not included in the guide, nor does it provide information about off-label use.

== Publications ==
Haymarket Group also publishes trade magazines.

== Conferences ==
Several one-day clinical conferences are held each year on topics such as dermatology, women's health, diabetes, and respiratory disease.

== MIMS Learning ==
MIMS Learning is an educational website for general practitioners and nurses offering clinical education modules. The website also has an integrated magazine, also named MIMS Learning.
