= Filhaal (disambiguation) =

Filhaal... is a 2002 Indian drama film by Meghna Gulzar.

Filhaal (lit. 'momentary') may also refer to:

- "Filhall", a 2019 Indian song by Jaani and B Praak
  - "Filhaal2 Mohabbat", a 2021 Indian song by Jaani and B Praak, follow-up to the 2019 song
