= Nupur Sanon =

Indian actress (born 1995)

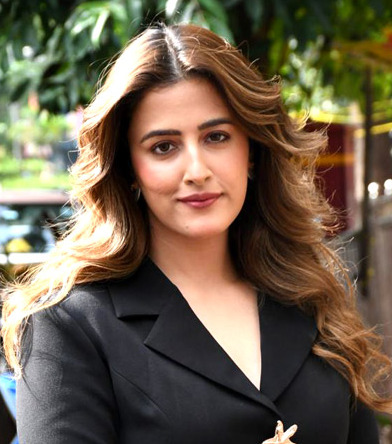
- Sanon in 2026
- Born: 15 December 1995 (age 30); Delhi, India
- Occupation: Actress
- Years active: 2019–present
- Spouse: Stebin Ben (m. 2026)
- Relatives: Kriti Sanon (sister)

Nupur Sanon (/ˈnuːpʊər ˈsænɒn/ NOOP-oor SAN-on; born 15 December 1995) is an Indian actress. The younger sister of actress Kriti Sanon, she began her career appearing in the music videos "Filhall" (2021). In 2023, she starred in the television series Pop Kaun? and the Telugu-language film Tiger Nageswara Rao.

== Career ==
Nupur Sanon appeared in the music videos of B Praak's songs, "Filhall" (2019) and "Filhaal 2: Mohabbat" (2021), both opposite Akshay Kumar. In 2023, she starred in the television series Pop Kaun? and played one of the leading ladies in the film Tiger Nageswara Rao.

== Filmography ==
Key
†	Denotes films that have not yet been released

=== Films ===
Year	Film	Role	Languages	Notes	Ref.
2023	Tiger Nageswara Rao	Sara	Telugu	Telugu film debut	
2027	Noorani Chehra †	Hiba	Hindi	Hindi film debut; filming	

=== Television ===
Year	Show	Role	Notes	Ref.
2023	Pop Kaun?	Pihu Chaupala	Released on Disney+ Hotstar	

=== Music videos ===
Year	Title	Role	Singer(s)	Ref.
2019	"Filhall"	Meher Grewal	B Praak	
2021	"Filhaal 2: Mohabbat"	Meher Grewal	B Praak	

== Personal life ==
Sanon had been in a relationship with Indian singer Stebin Ben since 2021. In January 2026, the couple announced their engagement after Ben proposed to Sanon and the couple married in Udaipur on 10 January 2026 in Christian and Hindu wedding ceremonies.
