= Tiger Nageswara Rao =

2023 Indian film by Vamsee

- Theatrical release poster
- Directed by: Vamsee
- Written by: Vamsee; Srikanth Vissa
- Dialogues by: Srikanth Vissa
- Produced by: Abhishek Agarwal
- Starring: Ravi Teja; Anupam Kher; Jisshu Sengupta; Renu Desai; Nupur Sanon; Anukreethy Vas; Gayatri Bhardwaj; Hareesh Peradi; Sudev Nair; Murali Sharma
- Cinematography: R. Madhi
- Edited by: Kotagiri Venkateswara Rao
- Music by: G. V. Prakash Kumar
- Production company: Abhishek Agarwal Arts
- Release date: 20 October 2023
- Running time: 182 minutes 157 minutes (trimmed version)
- Country: India
- Language: Telugu
- Budget: ₹55 crore
- Box office: ₹49 crores

Tiger Nageswara Rao is a 2023 Indian Telugu-language period action thriller film written and directed by Vamsee and produced by Abhishek Agarwal. The film stars Ravi Teja in the title role alongside Anupam Kher, Jisshu Sengupta, Nupur Sanon, Renu Desai (in her comeback role), Gayatri Bhardwaj, Hareesh Peradi, Sudev Nair and Murali Sharma. The music was composed by G. V. Prakash Kumar with cinematography by Kotagiri Venkateswara Rao and editing by R. Madhi.

The film released worldwide theatrically on 20 October 2023 to mixed reviews from critics and became a box-office bomb.

== Plot ==
IB Officer Raghavendra Rajput convenes a meeting with DSP Viswanath Sastry, Delhi Police Commissioner Singh, VIP Security Officer Anuj Gupta, and the Prime Minister's personal security head Vikram Choudhary to discuss Tiger Nageswara Rao, a notorious thief who dominated Stuartpuram in the 1970s.

In 1956, a young Nagi lives in poverty under Yelamanda, a powerful gangster controlling Stuartpuram. When Yelamanda refuses to pay his father extra wages, Nagi and his father rob him. When Nagi's father urges him to return the money, Nagi kills him instead. Years later, Nagi is trained by Gajjala Prasad, the region's criminal mentor. Yelamanda becomes an MLA, with his younger brother Kasi running the local operations. During an auction, businessman Angee Seth asks for help stealing a tobacco consignment. Kasi refuses, but Nagi accepts and burns down the ship to retrieve it, earning notoriety.

Nagi develops a relationship with a prostitute, Jayavani, leading to a violent altercation with Circle Inspector Mouli, whom Nagi blinds in one eye. Later, Nagi meets a college student, Sara, and falls in love. When Kasi kidnaps Sara over her family's debts, Nagi rescues her, declaring his control over both her and Stuartpuram. However, when they plan to elope, Kasi and the police ambush them. Sara, humiliated, slaps Nagi and leaves, but accidentally dies after being hit by a train.

Nagi is later imprisoned for refusing to reveal the location of smuggled gold but escapes after 14 years, killing Yelamanda's men and Kasi in revenge. Soon after, Rajput receives a threat from Nagi claiming he will rob the PM's residence within 48 hours. During heightened security, Nagi disguises himself as the PM, successfully deceiving the team. The real PM orders Nagi to have an immediate encounter.

Rajput visits Prasad, who explains that Nagi, despite his crimes, worked to improve Stuartpuram. In flashbacks, Nagi defends a young boy mistreated for being from the village, vows to end the corrupt annual auctions, and encourages education through a local teacher. He also redistributes flood relief that Yelamanda intended to steal, earning villagers’ respect. Nagi plans to establish a tobacco factory to provide employment but lacks the necessary funds and government approval, prompting him to commit a gold heist.

When Kasi tortures Nagi's friends to learn the gold's location, Yaari finally reveals it after witnessing a woman named Manga's brutal death. Enraged, Nagi kills Kasi and impales Yelamanda. He later reconnects with his childhood friend Mani and marries her. However, Yelamanda survives and conspires with Mouli to eliminate Nagi. Mani becomes pregnant but is tortured by Mouli until social reformer Hemalatha Lavanam intervenes. Hemalatha persuades Nagi to reform himself before helping the village, promising to legalize the tobacco factory if he surrenders. Although Nagi refuses, her efforts begin transforming Stuartpuram.

As Mouli kills Nagi's friends, Hemalatha submits the factory permit, but Yelamanda tries to block it. Mani gives birth to twins while Nagi plans a bank robbery to fund the project. During the heist, Mouli's men ambush Nagi's group, killing his companion. Nagi is wounded but destroys his pursuers with explosives. Rajput petitions the PM to reconsider, and Hemalatha agrees to represent Nagi legally.

Meanwhile, Nagi's ally betrays him to Mouli in exchange for his life, leading to Nagi's capture. Jayavani realizes too late that she has helped hand over Nagi. At Yelamanda's factory, Yelamanda boasts that the tobacco project has been canceled. However, a phone call from the party office informs him that he has been dismissed from his party and that the factory will proceed, recognizing Nagi's humanitarian efforts. After a brutal fight, Nagi strangles Yelamanda to death but is shot by Mouli, whom he manages to kill before dying. The villagers and Hemalatha arrive as Nagi, fatally wounded, entrusts his wife and children's future to her before succumbing to his wounds.

In the epilogue, it is revealed that the young Nagi killed his father at the latter's own request, believing one death could save many lives. Rajput salutes Nagi's grave, declaring his legacy will live on. A young boy walking to school meets a man who turns out to be Nagi, symbolizing the continuation of his spirit.

The end credits display events from the life of the real Tiger Nageswara Rao.

== Cast ==
- Ravi Teja as Tiger Nageswara Rao "Nagi"
- Anupam Kher as IB Officer Raghavendra Rajput
- Jisshu Sengupta as CI Mouli
- Murali Sharma as DSP Vishwanath Sastry
- Gayatri Bhardwaj as Mani, Nagi's wife
- Nupur Sanon as Sara, Nagi's love interest
- Renu Desai as Hemalatha Lavanam, social reformer
- Hareesh Peradi as MLA Yelamanda
- Sudev Nair as Kasi, Yelamanda’s younger brother
- Anukreethy Vas as Jayavani, Nagi's admirer and Jaya Rao’s love interest
- Nassar as Gajjala Prasad, Nagi’s trainer
- Aadukalam Naren as Nagi’s father
- Pradeep Rawat as Angee Seth, businessman
- Jwala Koti as Yelamanda's right hand
- Kancharlapalem Kishore as Yaari, Nagi’s right-hand
- Praveen Dacharam as Jaya Rao, Nagi’s friend
- Surya as Schoolteacher
- Chakrapani Ananda as Mani's father
- Meesai Rajendranath as Inspector Ponnu Saamy
- Besant Ravi as Besant Nagar Ravi

== Production ==
=== Development ===
In December 2017, Vamsee stated that he wanted to make a biographical film of Tiger Nageswara Rao, a thief who lived in the 1970s. In early March 2018, Rana Daggubati was reported to portray the role of Tiger Nageswara Rao. However, the sources were dismissed as in early June, Nani was reported to portray the role, but were later dismissed as in late April 2021, it was reported that Vamsee had met Ravi Teja in Hyderabad, while Teja was filming for Khiladi (2022), and narrated a script which impressed the actor. However, it was unclear whether it was the script of Tiger Nageswara Rao or a new script. On 3 November, a public announcement was made by[Abhishek Agarwal, who is producing the project under the banner Abhishek Agarwal Arts. The announcement further stated that the title is Tiger Nageswara Rao, confirming it to be the biological film, G. V. Prakash Kumar would compose the score, while R. Madhi and Kotagiri Venkateswara Rao would handle the cinematography and editing, respectively.

=== Filming ===
Principal photography of the film began on 2022 at a place of five acres near Shamshabad of Telangana and filming started in Hyderabad. During the shooting of the film, Ravi Teja was injured in an action scene and resumed filming after recovering from injury. Nupur Sanon and Anupam Kher joined the filming in 2022. The film team wrapped off in July 2023.

== Music ==
The music of the film is composed by G. V. Prakash Kumar. The first single titled "Ek Dum Ek Dum" was released on 5 September 2023. The second single titled "Veedu" was released on 21 September 2023. The third single titled "Icchesukuntaale" was released on 12 December 2023.

Tiger Nageswara Rao

Soundtrack album by G. V. Prakash Kumar
- Released: 2023
- Genre: Film soundtrack
- Length: 12:14
- Language: Telugu
- Label: Saregama
- Producer: G. V. Prakash Kumar

G. V. Prakash Kumar chronology
Mark Antony (2023)	Tiger Nageswara Rao (2023)	Japan (2023)

Singles from Tiger Nageswara Rao
- 1. "Ek Dum Ek Dum" Released: 5 September 2023; 2. "Veedu" Released: 21 September 2023

Track listing
No.	Title	Lyrics	Singer(s)	Length
1.	"Ek Dum Ek Dum"	Bhaskarabhatla	Anurag Kulkarni	4:20
2.	"Veedu"	Chandrabose	Anurag Kulkarni	3:18
3.	"Icchesukuntaale"	Bhaskarabhatla	Sinduri Vishal	4:36

== Release ==
=== Theatrical ===
The film was released on 20 October 2023, along with dubbed versions in Tamil, Hindi, Kannada, and Malayalam languages.

=== Home media ===
The film's digital rights were bought by Amazon Prime Video in all languages. On the platform, the film was premiered on 17 November 2023 in Telugu and dubbed versions of Tamil, Malayalam and Kannada languages.

The Hindi version was trimmed to 144 minutes and released on YouTube, where it received high viewership.

== Reception ==
=== Critical reception ===
On the review aggregator website Rotten Tomatoes, 20% of 5 critics' reviews are positive, with an average rating of 6/10.

Raghu Bandi of The Indian Express rated the film with 2/5 stars and wrote "Tiger Nageswara Rao has big ambitions, but the heart of the film is not in the right place. The result is a movie that is not convincing enough." Janani K of India Today rated the film with 2/5 stars and wrote "‘Tiger Nageswara Rao’ needed more punch to keep the audience glued to their seats throughout the film. Had the team concentrated on the film's pacing, it could have achieved the desired impact. Gautaman Bhaskaran of News 18 rated the film with 2/5 stars and wrote "Ravi Teja Starrer Loses Focus And Wanders All Over The Place".

Balakrishna Ganeshan of The News Minute rated the film with 1.5/5 stars and wrote "presenting a sensitive subject in a commercial format without nuance results in Tiger Nageswara Rao ending up as a lousy film." Mayur Sanap of Rediff.com rated the film with 1/5 stars and wrote "Despite Ravi Teja's relentless energy, the drama is bogged down by the tedious emotional beats in its dramatic moments. In its final stretch, when the film wants you to be moved, you only feel exasperated.". The movie was reviewed by the Telugu newspaper Eenadu and they observed that, with the exception of a few scenes, the overall quality of the film falls short of expectations.
