= Jaani (songwriter) =

Indian songwriter and music composer (born 1989)

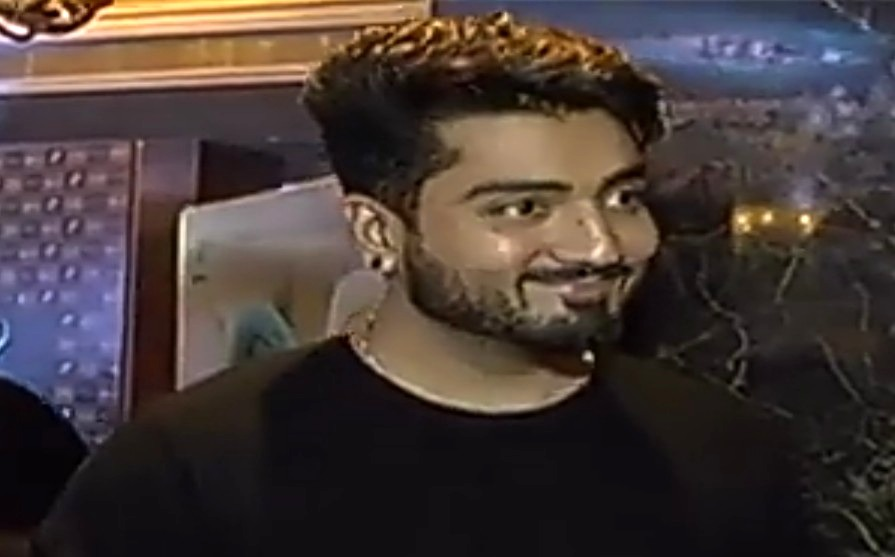
- Jaani in 2019

Background information
- Born: Rajiv Arora; 25 May 1989 (age 37)
- Origin: Gidderbaha, Punjab, India
- Genres: Soulful music; Pop; Romantic; Sad; Bollywood
- Occupations: Lyricist; music composer
- Years active: 2012–present
- Labels: Desi Melodies; T-Series; Speed Records; Sony Music India; White Hill music

Rajiv Arora (born 25 May 1989), known professionally as Jaani, is an Indian songwriter and music composer associated with Punjabi and Hindi language songs. His notable songs "Naah", "Kya Baat Ay", "Pachtaoge", "Filhall", "Titliyaan", "Baarish Ki Jaaye" and "Filhaal2 Mohabbat".

== Personal life ==
Jaani was born as Rajiv Arora on 25 May 1989. He is from Gidderbaha, a town near Bhatinda in Punjab, India, and holds a diploma in hotel management. Jaani married Neha Chauhan on 25 November 2008.

== Career ==
Jaani started his career with a religious song, "Sant Sipahi", in 2012. However, he gained fame after song "Soch", sung by Hardy Sandhu and composed by B Praak. The music video of this song was directed by Arvindr Khaira. A Hindi version of "Soch" was released as well as an English recreation of soch with the name 'Without You (Soch)' was produced by T-Series which featured English vocals as well as music and English lyrics by Vaibhav Saxena.

Since "Soch", B Praak, Jaani, Arvindr Khaira, and Harrdy Sandhu have worked as a team, producing Punjabi songs, such as "Joker", "Backbone", "HornBlow", "Naah", "Yaar Ni Mileya" and "Kya Baat Ayy". His album Shayar with composer B Praak released in 2015, which includes tracks like "Taara" by Ammy Virk, "Ik Saal" by Jassie Gill and "Naa Ji Naa" by Harrdy Sandhu.

He has started his own music label known as Desi Melodies with filmmaker Arvindr Khaira and B Praak.

In 2021, he made his screen debut as an actor in Jagdeep Sidhu's Punjabi film Qismat 2, with Ammy Virk and Sargun Mehta in lead roles.

== Singles/Albums ==
Jaani discography
- Studio albums: 4
- Singles: 121

=== Albums ===
| Title | Notes |
|---|---|
| Shayar | Released : 2014–15; Songs : 9; Music : B Praak; Label : Sony Music India; Singers : Ammy Virk, Harrdy Sandhu, Jassie Gill, Amrinder, Manraaj, G Preet, Shivam, Armaan Kang |
| Jaani Ve | Released : 2019–20; Songs : 3; Music : B Praak; Label : T-Series; Singers : Arijit Singh, Neha Kakkar, B Praak |
| Zohrajabeen | Released : 2023; Songs : 10; Music : B Praak; Label : DM - Desi Melodies; Singers : B Praak |
| Mann Bebaak | Released : 2026; Songs : 15; Music : Janab Zain Saifi; Label : Janab Zain Saifi; Singers : Jaani; Instrumental album |

=== Singles ===
| Year | Song | Singer | Music | Notes |
|---|---|---|---|---|
| 2013 | Soch | Harrdy Sandhu | B Praak | Debut Track |
| 2014 | Joker | Harrdy Sandhu | B Praak | |
| 2014 | Saree Wali Girl | Girik Aman | B Praak | |
| 2014 | Ik Saal | Jassi Gill | B Praak | From His Album "Shayar" |
| 2015 | Taara | Ammy Virk | B Praak | From His Album "Shayar" |
| 2015 | Naa Ji Naa | Harrdy Sandhu | B Praak | From His Album "Shayar" |
| 2015 | Jaguar | Sukh-E Muzical Doctorz ft. Bohemia | Sukhe Musical Doctorz | Sukhe's Breakthrough song |
| 2015 | Go Baby Go | RONNIE ft.B Praak | B Praak | |
| 2015 | Supna | Amrinder Gill | B Praak | |
| 2015 | Mere Kol | Prabh Gill | B Praak | |
| 2015 | O Kithe | Kamal Khan | B Praak | |
| 2015 | Yaar Matlabi | Karan Benipal | B Praak | |
| 2015 | Paani | Yuvraj Hans | B Praak | Featuring Yuvika Chaudhary |
| 2015 | All Black | Sukh-E Muzical Doctorz Feat Raftaar | Sukh-E Muzical Doctorz | |
| 2016 | Horn Blow | Harrdy Sandhu | B Praak | |
| 2016 | Surma To Sandals | Ammy Virk ft.B Praak | B Praak | |
| 2016 | Do Din | Manraaj | B Praak | |
| 2016 | Marijuana | Hardik Trehan | B Praak | |
| 2016 | Ik Vaari Hor Soch Le | Harish Verma | B Praak | Debut track of Harish Verma |
| 2016 | Hauli Hauli | BIG Dhillon | B Praak | |
| 2016 | Gabroo | Jassi Gill | Preet Hundal | |
| 2016 | Suicide | Sukhe Musical Doctorz | B Praak | |
| 2016 | Bacha | Prabh Gill | B Praak | |
| 2016 | Backbone | Harrdy Sandhu | B Praak | |
| 2016 | Pucheya Na Karo | Sammy Singh | B Praak | |
| 2016 | Ghat Boldi | Gippy Grewal | B Praak | |
| 2016 | Subha Subha | Ranvir | B Praak | |
| 2016 | Do You Know | Diljit Dosanjh | B Praak | |
| 2017 | Kudiye Snapchat Waliye | Ranvir Feat Sukh-E Muzical Doctorz | Sukh-E Muzical Doctorz | |
| 2017 | Star | Jayy Randhawa Feat Sukh-E | Sukh-E Muzical Doctorz | |
| 2017 | Mann Bharya | B Praak | B Praak | Debut Track Of B Praak |
| 2017 | Yaar Ve | Harish Verma | B Praak | |
| 2017 | Oye Hoye Oye Hoye | Jaz Dhami | B Praak | |
| 2017 | Car Nachdi | Gippy Grewal Feat Bohemia | B Praak | |
| 2017 | Qismat | Ammy Virk | B Praak | Featuring Sargun Mehta |
| 2017 | Gall Goriye | Maninder Buttar Feat Raftaar | Raftaar | |
| 2017 | Superstar | Sukh-E Muzical Doctorz, Divya Bhatt | Sukh-E Muzical Doctorz | |
| 2017 | Violin | Arshhh Feat Roach Killa | B Praak | |
| 2017 | Bewafaai | B Praak | B Praak | Featuring Gauhar Khan |
| 2017 | Jimmy Choo Choo | Guri Feat Ikka | B Praak | |
| 2017 | Yaar Ni Milya | Harrdy Sandhu | B Praak | |
| 2017 | Jaani Tera Naa | Sunanda Sharma | Sukh-E Muzical Doctorz | |
| 2017 | Guitar Sikhda | Jassi Gill | B Praak | |
| 2017 | Naah | Harrdy Sandhu | B Praak | Featuring Nora Fatehi |
| 2017 | Nai Shad Da | Gippy Grewal | Jay K (Jassi Katyal) | |
| 2017 | Mill Lo Na | Guri | Sukh-E Muzical Doctorz | |
| 2017 | Insane | Sukh-E Muzical Doctorz | Sukh-E Muzical Doctorz | |
| 2018 | Dil Ton Black | Jassi Gill feat Badshah | B Praak | |
| 2018 | Gallan | Manj Musik | Manj Musik | Featuring Candice James |
| 2018 | Hath Chumme | Ammy Virk | First Song as Producer from "Desi Melodies" | |
| 2018 | Bamb | Sukh-E Muzical Doctorz Feat Badshah | Sukh-E Muzical Doctorz | |
| 2018 | Sooraj | Gippy Grewal | B Praak | |
| 2018 | Mastaani | B Praak | B Praak | |
| 2018 | Morni | Sunanda Sharma | Sukh-E Muzical Doctorz | |
| 2018 | Mai Terra Akshay | Babbal Rai ft Bohemia | B Praak | |
| 2018 | Nikle Currant | Jassi Gill and Neha Kakkar | Sukhe Muzical Doctorz | |
| 2018 | Fitoor | Jayy Randhawa | B Praak | |
| 2018 | Kya Baat Ay | Harrdy Sandhu | B Praak | |
| 2018 | Hath Chumme (Cover) | B Praak ft. Jaani | B Praak | |
| 2018 | Teri Khamiyan | Akhil | B Praak | Featuring Wamiqa Gabbi |
| 2018 | Pinjraa | Gurnazar Chattha | B Praak | |
| 2018 | I Need Ya | Sukh-E Muzical Doctorz | B Praak | Featuring Krysle D'Souza |
| 2019 | Coka | Sukh-E Muzical Doctorz | Sukh-E Muzical Doctorz | |
| 2019 | Ve Pathra | Gursaaz | B Praak | |
| 2019 | Gali Da Gunda | Sahiba | B Praak | |
| 2019 | Sandal | Sunanda Sharma | Sukh-E Muzical Doctorz | |
| 2019 | Jaani Ve Jaani | Jaani ft. Afsana Khan | Sukh-E Muzical Doctorz | Composed by B Praak |
| 2019 | Nain Tere | B Praak | Sukh-E Muzical Doctorz | |
| 2019 | Rona Sikhade Ve | Miel | B Praak | |
| 2019 | Hawaa | Grann Sidhu | B Praak | |
| 2019 | Pachtaoge | Arijit Singh | B Praak | • Featuring Vicky Kaushal And Nora Fatehi • From His Album "Jaani Ve" |
| 2019 | Wah Wai Wahh | Sukh-E Muzical Doctorz & Neha Kakkar | Sukh-E Muzical Doctorz | |
| 2019 | Dil Mangdi | Jazzy B | Sukh-E Muzical Doctorz | |
| 2019 | Laare | Maninder Buttar | B Praak | Featuring Sargun Mehta |
| 2019 | Kalla Changa | Ninja | B Praak | |
| 2019 | Filhall | B Praak | B Praak | •Featuring Akshay Kumar and Nupur Sanon • 1 billion+ views on YouTube. |
| 2019 | Yaad Piya Ki Aane Lagi | Neha Kakkar | Tanishk Bagchi | Featuring Divya Khosla Kumar |
| 2019 | Dance Like | Harrdy Sandhu | B Praak | Featuring Lauren Gottlieb |
| 2019 | Duji Vaar Pyar | Sunanda Sharma | Sukh-E Muzical Doctorz | |
| 2020 | Where Baby Where | Gippy Grewal | Sukh-E Muzical Doctorz | Featuring Amanda Cerny |
| 2020 | Jinke Liye | Neha Kakkar ft. Jaani | B Praak | From His Album "Jaani Ve " Also Featuring Himself in music video |
| 2020 | Kuch Bhi Ho Jaye | B Praak | B Praak | |
| 2020 | Video Bana De | Sukh-E Muzical Doctorz ft.Aastha Gill | Sukh-E Muzical Doctorz | |
| 2020 | Naam | Tulsi Kumar ft.Millind Gaba | Millind Gaba | |
| 2020 | Bandeya | Gurjot Singh Kaler | B Praak | |
| 2020 | Taaron Ke Shehar | Jubin Nautiyal and Neha Kakkar | Jaani | First song as Music Composer |
| 2020 | Lala Lala Lori | Fazilpuria and Afsana Khan | Sukh-E Muzical Doctorz | First Haryanvi Song |
| 2020 | Banglow | Avvy Sra and Afsana Khan | Avvy Sra and Sukh-E Muzical Doctorz | Debut Track Of "Avvy Sra" |
| 2020 | Titliaan | Afsana Khan | Avvy Sra | Featuring Harrdy Sandhu And Sargun Mehta |
| 2020 | Besharam Bewaffa | B Praak | | From Album "Jaani Ve" |
| 2021 | Titliaan Warga | Harrdy Sandhu ft. Jaani | Avvy Sra | Sequel To "Titliaan" |
| 2021 | Pagal Nahi Hona | Sunanda Sharma | Avvy Sra | Featuring Sonu Sood |
| 2021 | Mazaa | B Praak | | Featuring Gurmeet Chaudhary & Hansika Motwani |
| 2021 | Barish Ki Jaaye | B Praak | | Featuring Nawazudin Siddiqui & Sunanda Sharma |
| 2021 | Munda Like Karda | Gurj Sidhu | Sukh-E-Muzical Doctorz | |
| 2021 | Goriyaan Goriyaan | Romanna | B Praak | Debut Track Of Romanna |
| 2021 | Doob Gaye | Guru Randhawa | B Praak | Featuring Urvashi Rautela |
| 2021 | Patthar Wargi | Ranvir | B Praak | |
| 2021 | Filhaal2 Mohabbat | B Praak | B Praak | Sequel to "Filhaal" featuring Akshay Kumar, Nupur Sanon. |
| 2021 | Khair Allah Khair | Romanna | Jaani | Lyrics and Composition by Romanna |
| 2021 | Chorri Chorri | Sunanda Sharma | Avvy Sra | Featuring Priyank Sharma |
| 2021 | Apsraa | Jaani Ft. Asees Kaur | Jaani | Poetry Narrated by Jaani and vocals by Asses kaur |
| 2021 | Bijlee Bijlee | Harrdy Sandhu | B Praak | |
| 2021 | Coco | Sukh-E-Muzical Doctorz | | |
| 2022 | Ik Mil Mainu Apsraa | B Praak | | With Asees Kaur |
| 2022 | Kali Shirt Waleya | Simran Raj | Avvy Sra | Debut song of Simran Raj |
| 2022 | Saadi Yaad | Sunanda Sharma | Jaani | |
| 2022 | Ishq Nahi Karte | B Praak | | Featuring Emraan Hashmi |
| 2022 | Kudiyan Lahore diyan | Harrdy Sandhu | B Praak | Featuring Aisha Sharma |
| 2022 | Nikal Jaana | Miel, Jaani | Hunny, Bunny | |
| 2022 | Dhokebaaz | Afsana Khan | Jaani | Featuring Vivek Oberoi |
| 2022 | 9-9 Mashukan | Sunanda Sharma | Jaani | |
| 2022 | Duniya | B Praak | | Featuring Sunny Singh, Saiee Manjrekar |
| 2022 | Nikaah | Ipsitaa | Avvy Sra | Featuring Rohit Khandewal |
| 2022 | Jaana | Stebin Ben | Hunny, Bunny | |
| 2022 | Peacock | Avvy Sra, Sultaan | Avvy Sra | Co-lyricist Sultaan |
| 2022 | O Sajna | Neha Kakkar | Tanishk Bagchi | |
| 2022 | Fantasy | Sukh-E Muzical Doctorz, Aastha Gill | Avvy Sra and Sukh-E Muzical Doctorz | |
| 2022 | More Saiyaan Ji | Maninder Buttar | B Praak | Featuring Jasmin Bhasin |
| 2022 | Kya Hota | Romana | Hunny Bunny | Featuring Anjali Arora |
| 2022 | White Brown Black | Avvy Sra, Karan Aujla | Avvy Sra | Co-lyricist Karan Aujla |
| 2023 | Kya Karoon | Sanam Puri | Jaani | Featuring Jasmin Bhasin |
| 2023 | Maria Senorita | Rajveer, Happy Singh | Dr Zeus | |
| 2023 | Achha Sila Diya | B Praak | B Praak | Featuring Rajkumar Rao & Nora Fatehi |
| 2023 | Ittar | Jasmine Sandlas | B Praak | |
| 2023 | Yaad Aati Hai | Harrdy Sandhu | Hunny, Bunny | |
| 2023 | Ankhaan Meech Ke | Akhil Sachdeva | B Praak | |
| 2023 | Kya Loge Tum | B Praak | B Praak | Featuring Akshay Kumar and Amyra Dastur |
| 2023 | Krishna Teri Ho Gayi | Asees Kaur | Gaurav Dev, Kartik Dev | |
| 2023 | Yaar Ka Sataya Hua Hai | B Praak | | |
| 2023 | Allah De Bandeya | B Praak | | |
| 2023 | Mal Mal | B Praak | B Praak | Featuring Aly Goni, Jasmin Bhasin |
| 2023 | Zohrajabeen | B Praak | B Praak | Featuring Randeep Hooda, Priyanka Choudhary |
| 2023 | Main Aunga | B Praak | B Praak | |
| 2024 | Theek Hai Na Tu? | Sarang Sikander | B Praak | |
| 2024 | Paon Ki Jutti | Jyoti Nooran | Bunny | Featuring Shiv Pandit, Isha Malviya |
| 2024 | Baby Don't Ditch Me | Honeyjeet Singh | B Praak | |
| 2025 | Aayiye Ram Ji | Shreya Ghoshal | B Praak | Featuring Shriya Saran |
| 2025 | Mahakaal | B Praak | B Praak | |
| 2025 | Mahakaal(Telugu Version) | B Praak | B Praak | lyrics written with Kalyana Chakravarthy and Tripuraneni |
| 2025 | Apsraa 2 | Jaani, Asees Kaur | Bunny | Featuring Jaani, Diana Titkova |
| 2025 | Saasu Maa | Jyoti Nooran | Bunny | Featuring Aditi Rao Hydari, Anjumm Shharma |
| 2025 | Dil Kaat Ke | B Praak | Bunny | Featuring Sakshi Vaidya, Rajniesh Duggal |
| 2025 | Europe Di Gali | Jaani, Asees Kaur | Bunny | Featuring Jaani, Assa |
| 2026 | Jee Nai Lagda | Jasmine Sandlas | Bunny | Featuring Jasmine Sandlas |

== Songs in films ==
Jaani discography
- Punjabi Film Songs: 54
- Hindi Film Songs: 17

| Year | Film | Song | Singer | Composer | Language |
|---|---|---|---|---|---|
| 2016 | Sarabjit | Dard | Sonu Nigam | Jeet Ganguli | Hindi |
| 2016 | Kaptaan | Oscar | Gippy Grewal, Badshah | B Praak | Punjabi |
| 2017 | Sargi | Fer Ohi Hoyea | Jassie Gill | B Praak | Punjabi |
| 2018 | Qismat | Kaun Hoyega | B Praak Divya Bhatt | B Praak | Punjabi |
| 2018 | Qismat | Dholna | B Praak | B Praak | Punjabi |
| 2018 | Qismat | Awaaz | Kamal Khan | B Praak | Punjabi |
| 2018 | Qismat | Fakira | Gurnam Bhullar | B Praak | Punjabi |
| 2018 | Qismat | Gallan Teriyan | Ammy Virk, Neetu Bhalla | Sukhe Musical Doctorz | Punjabi |
| 2018 | Qismat | Pasand Jatt Di | Ammy Virk | Sukhe Musical Doctorz | Punjabi |
| 2018 | Carry On Jatta 2 | DJ Wala | Gippy Grewal | Sukhe Musical Doctorz | Punjabi |
| 2019 | High End Yaariyaan | Rabba Ve | B Praak | B Praak | |
| 2019 | Bala | Naah Goriye | Harrdy Sandhu | B Praak | Hindi |
| 2020 | Jai Mummy Di | Mummy Nu Pasand | Sunanda Sharma | Tanishk Bagchi | Hindi |
| 2020 | Sufna | Jaan Deyan Ge | Ammy Virk | B Praak | Punjabi |
| 2020 | Sufna | Ammi | Kamal Khan | B Praak | Punjabi |
| 2020 | Sufna | Qubool Ae | Hashmat Sultana | B Praak | Punjabi |
| 2020 | Sufna | Jannat | B Praak | B Praak | Punjabi |
| 2020 | Sufna | Chaana Ve | B Praak | B Praak | Punjabi |
| 2020 | Sufna | Shukriya | B Praak | B Praak | Punjabi |
| 2020 | Ik Sandhu Hunda Si | Galib | B Praak | B Praak | Punjabi |
| 2021 | Shershaah | Mann Bharrya 2.0 | B Praak | B Praak | Hindi |
| 2021 | Ucha Pind | Maula | B Praak | B Praak | Punjabi |
| 2021 | Ucha Pind | Channa Ve | Kamal Khan | B Praak | Punjabi |
| 2021 | Qismat 2 | Qismat 2 – Title Track | B Praak | B Praak | Punjabi |
| 2021 | Qismat 2 | Janam | Romy | B Praak | Punjabi |
| 2021 | Qismat 2 | Teri Akheeyan | Ammy Virk, Afsana Khan | B Praak | Punjabi |
| 2021 | Qismat 2 | Kis Mod Te | B Praak, Jyoti Nooran | B Praak | Punjabi |
| 2021 | Qismat 2 | Mere Yaara Ve | B Praak | B Praak | Punjabi |
| 2021 | Qismat 2 | Paagla | B Praak, Asees Kaur | B Praak | Punjabi |
| 2022 | Bachchhan Paandey | Meri Jaan Meri Jaan | B Praak | B Praak | Hindi |
| 2022 | Bachchhan Paandey | Saare Bolo Bewafa | B Praak | Jaani | Hindi |
| 2022 | Lekh | Udd Gya | B Praak | B Praak | Punjabi |
| 2022 | Lekh | Bewafai Kar Gaya | B Praak | B Praak | Punjabi |
| 2022 | Lekh | Mera Yaar | Gurnam Bhullar | B Praak | Punjabi |
| 2022 | Lekh | Beliya | Gurnam Bhullar | B Praak | Punjabi |
| 2022 | Lekh | Zarori Nai | Afsana Khan | B Praak | Punjabi |
| 2022 | Liger | Coka 2.0 | Sukh-E, Lisa Mishra | Jaani, DJ Chetas-Lijo George | Hindi |
| 2022 | Liger | Coka 2.0 | Ram Miriyala, Geetha Madhuri | Jaani, DJ Chetas-Lijo George | Telugu |
| 2022 | Liger (D) | Coka 2.0 | Ram Miriyala, Geetha Madhuri | Jaani, DJ Chetas-Lijo George | Tamil |
| 2022 | Moh | Sab Kuch | B Praak | B Praak | Punjabi |
| 2022 | Moh | Salooq | B Praak | B Praak | Punjabi |
| 2022 | Moh | Meri Zuban | Kamal Khan | B Praak | Punjabi |
| 2022 | Moh | Mere Kol | Afsana Khan | B Praak | Punjabi |
| 2022 | Moh | Aulaad | Jaani | B Praak | Punjabi |
| 2022 | Honeymoon | Jhaanjar | B Praak | B Praak | Punjabi |
| 2022 | Honeymoon | Aa Chaliye | B Praak | B Praak | Punjabi |
| 2022 | Honeymoon | Hypnotize | Guppy Grewal, Shipra Goyal | B Praak | Punjabi |
| 2022 | Honeymoon | Naa Main Bewafa | Tanvir Hussain | B Praak | Punjabi |
| 2022 | Honeymoon | Honeymoon Title Track | Gippy Grewal, Simar Kaur | B Praak | Punjabi |
| 2022 | Govinda Naam Mera | "Kya Baat Ay 2.0" | Harrdy Sandhu, Nikhita Gandhi | Tanishk Bagchi, B Praak, Kimera | Hindi |
| 2023 | Carry on Jatta 3 | Carry On Jatta 3 Title Track | Gippy Grewal, Simar Kaur | Jaani | Punjabi |
| 2023 | Carry on Jatta 3 | Farishtey | B Praak | Jaani | Punjabi |
| 2023 | Carry on Jatta 3 | Jatti | Ammy Virk, Gippy Grewal | Jaani | Punjabi |
| 2023 | Carry on Jatta 3 | Lehanga | Gippy Grewal | Jaani | Punjabi |
| 2023 | Carry on Jatta 3 | Bura Haal | Atif Aslam | Jaani | Punjabi |
| 2023 | Carry on Jatta 3 | Kaale Jaadu | Gippy Grewal | Jaani | Punjabi |
| 2023 | Animal | Saari Duniya Jalaa Denge | B Praak | Jaani | Hindi |
| 2023 | Animal | "Saari Duniya Jalaa Denge" (Extended Film Version) | B Praak | Jaani | Hindi |
| 2023 | Animal | "Yaalo Yaalaa" (D) | Anurag Kulkarni | Jaani | Telugu |
| 2023 | Animal | "Yaalo Yaalaa" (Extended Film Version) (D) | Anurag Kulkarni | Jaani | Telugu |
| 2023 | Animal | "Moochchaangoode" (D) | Mahalingam | Jaani | Tamil |
| 2023 | Animal | "Moochchaangoode" (Extended Film Version) (D) | Mahalingam | Jaani | Tamil |
| 2023 | Animal | "Enivarumo Aa Nall" (D) | Mahalingam | Jaani | Malayalam |
| 2023 | Animal | "Enivarumo Aa Nall" (Extended Film Version) (D) | Mahalingam | Jaani | Malayalam |
| 2023 | Animal | "Appa Nee Nagu" (D) | Anurag Kulkarni | Jaani | Kannada |
| 2023 | Animal | "Appa Nee Nagu" (Extended Film Version) (D) | Anurag Kulkarni | Jaani | Kannada |
| 2024 | Yodha | "Qismat Badal Di" | B Praak | B Praak, Aditya Dev | Hindi |
| 2024 | Mr. & Mrs. Mahi | "Dekha Tenu" | Mohammad Faiz | Jaani | Hindi |
| 2025 | Raid 2 | "Nasha" | Jasmine Sandlas, Sachet Tandon, Divya Kumar, Sumontho Mukherjee | White Noise Collectives | Hindi |
| 2025 | Sarzameen | Mere Murshid Mere Yaara" | Vishal Mishra, Salman Ali | Vishal Mishra | Hindi |
| 2025 | Son of Sardaar 2 | "Pehla Tu Duja Tu" | Vishal Mishra | Jaani, Hunny | Hindi |
| 2025 | Son of Sardaar 2 | "Nachdi" | Neha Kakkar | Jaani, Hunny | Hindi |
| 2025 | De De Pyaar De 2 | "3 Shaukk" | Karan Aujla, Jyotica Tangri, Avvy Sra | Avvy Sra, DJ Chetas | Hindi |
| 2026 | Ishqnama | Narak | B Praak, Jyotica Tangri | B Praak | Punjabi |
| 2026 | Ishqnama | Tu Ladvayengi | G Khan, Jasmeen Akhtar | Jaani | Punjabi |
| 2026 | Ishqnama | Narak - Reprise Version | Shehnaaz Gill,Bunny | B Praak | Punjabi |
| 2026 | Ishqnama | Ki Keya | B Praak | Jaani | Punjabi |
| 2026 | Ishqnama | Aaja Yaara | B Praak | Jaani | Punjabi |
| 2026 | Ishqnama | Duniya | B Praak | Jaani | Punjabi |
| 2026 | Ishqnama | Mirzya | Afsana Khan | B Praak | Punjabi |
| 2026 | Ishqnama | Kabutar Chine | Bhupinder Babbal | Jaani | Punjabi |
