= Bala (2019 film) =

2019 Indian film by Amar Kaushik

- Theatrical release poster
- Directed by: Amar Kaushik
- Written by: Niren Bhatt
- Screenplay by: Ravi Muppa
- Story by: Pavel Bhattacharjee
- Produced by: Dinesh Vijan
- Starring: Ayushmann Khurrana; Bhumi Pednekar; Yami Gautam
- Narrated by: Vijay Raaz
- Cinematography: Anuj Rakesh Dhawan
- Edited by: Hemanti Sarkar
- Music by: Songs and Score: Sachin–Jigar; Guest Composers: Jaani; B Praak
- Production companies: Maddock Films; Jio Studios
- Distributed by: AA Films
- Release date: 8 November 2019
- Running time: 133 minutes
- Country: India
- Language: Hindi
- Budget: ₹25 crore
- Box office: ₹172 crore

Bala is a 2019 Indian Hindi-language satirical comedy film directed by Amar Kaushik and produced by Dinesh Vijan, based on an original story by Bengali film director Pavel Bhattacharjee. It stars Ayushmann Khurrana, Bhumi Pednekar and Yami Gautam.

Bala revolves around the protagonist Balmukund Shukla, a young man living in Kanpur who is suffering from male pattern baldness, and the story is about his lack of confidence and the societal pressure that comes with premature balding. It highlights social issues of baldness and colourism. Filming was held in Kanpur, Mumbai and Lucknow. The soundtrack album was composed by Sachin–Jigar.

Bala was released in preview shows on 7 November 2019, prior to its cinema release a day later. It is a critical and commercial success, grossing ₹172 crore worldwide against a production budget of ₹25 crore. Bala was showcased in Indo-German Filmweek 2020 in Berlin on 27 September 2020. At the 65th Filmfare Awards, Bala received 3 nominations, including Best Actor (Khurrana) and Best Supporting Actress (Seema Pahwa).

== Plot ==
The film opens in Kanpur in 2005, where 14-year-old Balmukund "Bala" Shukla, proud of his hair, leads his classmates in teasing a bald teacher. He borrows notes from the studious, dark-complexioned Latika Trivedi and passes them off as his own to impress the fair-skinned Shruti. When Latika exposes him, Bala insults her complexion. The narrator notes society's preference for beauty and fair skin, particularly in marriage.

Fourteen years later, Bala is balding prematurely and works as a fairness-cream salesman by day and a nightclub comedian by night. Blaming his baldness on his father's genes, he lashes out at his bald father Hari, a ghar jamai. Hari gives him a wig and reminds him that baldness is only external. With renewed confidence, Bala begins courting Pari Mishra, a fair-skinned model, and they decide to marry. Before the wedding, Bala texts Pari to disclose his baldness, but the message accidentally reaches someone else. Believing Pari knows and accepts the truth, he marries her.

Latika meanwhile faces repeated rejection from prospective suitors because of her dark skin. An Australia-settled NRI, Rohan, is attracted to her, but their meeting collapses when his mother comments on her complexion. Rohan later reconciles with Latika, revealing that he was initially attracted to her Instagram profile. Latika says she has no Instagram account, exposing that Bala had created a fake profile using airbrushed photographs of her at his aunt's request.

Furious, Latika confronts Bala the day after his wedding, insisting that she is not ashamed of her skin and warning him to stay out of her life. Pari overhears, discovers Bala's baldness and leaves him. She explains that her looks are both her main source of attention and her livelihood, as she lacks the academic ability to pursue another profession. She subsequently seeks to annul their marriage.

Feeling responsible, Latika apologises and becomes Bala's lawyer. During the court case, she establishes that Pari married Bala for his wit and charm and that he neither defrauded nor deliberately misled her, although he concealed his baldness. Pari argues that someone uncomfortable with himself cannot sustain a relationship. Bala ultimately agrees that Pari has the right to end the marriage, explaining that the law cannot compel love and that a half-hearted marriage cannot succeed.

At a fairness-cream sales event, Bala realises that beauty is only skin-deep and publicly removes his wig, embracing his appearance. He also realises that he loves Latika and rushes to propose, only to find Rohan and his family arranging her marriage. Latika rejects Bala's proposal, though they resume their friendship.

The film ends with Bala accepting his baldness and performing a new comedy routine about skin-deep beauty and the meaning of life.

== Cast ==
- Ayushmann Khurrana as Balmukund "Bala" Shukla
  - Sachin Choudhary as young Bala
- Bhumi Pednekar as Latika Trivedi, Bala's schoolmate and childhood friend
  - Saniya Touqeer as young Latika
- Yami Gautam as Pari Mishra, Bala's former wife
- Javed Jaffrey as Bachchan Dubey, Bala's friend
- Saurabh Shukla as Hari Ram Shukla, Bala's father
- Seema Bhargava Pahwa as Indira "Aanra" Jakharia, Latika's maternal aunt
- Varun Shashi Rao as Rohan Joshi, Latika's boyfriend
- Deepika Chikhalia as Sushila Mishra, Pari's mother
- Sunita Rajwar as Manju Bajpai Shukla, Bala's mother
- Umesh Shukla as Bhuvan Kumar Bajpai, Bala's grandfather
- Abhishek Banerjee as Ajeet "Ajju" Saini
  - Rajat Singh as young Ajju
- Charu Agrawal as Shruti Kanojia
  - Sunehri Shah as young Shruti
- Dheerendra Kumar Gautam as Bihaan Shukla, Bala's brother
- Sonam Bajwa as Swasti
- Harrdy Sandhu in the song "Naah Goriye"
- Aparshakti Khurana as Arjun Singh, Shruti's boyfriend
- Sumit Arora as Vivek Saxena, Bala's boss
- Ziya Ahmed as Vishal Mishra, Pari's father
- Ranjan Raj as Sumit Singh
- Sushil Dubey as school teacher Anand Biswas
- Mushtaq Khan as Nikhil Raina
- Mukteshwar as Madhav Saini, Ajju's father
- Anand Mishra as Mukesh Kashyap, Bala's friend
- Prabhat Kumar as Ruppan Walia
- Aatmaja Pandey as Vikas Tripathi, Latika's client
- Sawan Nigam as Nandkishore Arora
- Swastika Chakraborty as Keerti Joshi, Rohan's mother
- Shashie Verma as Hair transplant Doctor
- Vijay Raaz as personification of hair / Narrator (Voice)

== Production ==
=== Casting ===
The cast of the film was announced by producer Dinesh Vijan. The film, directed by Amar Kaushik, was publicized to star Ayushmann Khurrana in the titular role, Yami Gautam as a model based in Lucknow and Bhumi Pednekar as a dusky small-town educated woman.

=== Filming ===
Principal photography began on 6 May 2019, and the film was shot in Mumbai, Lucknow, and Kanpur. Filming concluded on 7 July 2019, with a special party for the wrap-up.

== Soundtrack ==
Bala

Soundtrack album by Sachin–Jigar, Jaani and B Praak
- Released: 8 November 2019
- Recorded: 2019
- Genre: Feature film soundtrack
- Length: 15:32
- Language: Hindi
- Label: Sony Music India

The music and background score is composed by Sachin–Jigar, with guest composers Jaani and B Praak composing the song "Naah Goriye" which is a recreated version of the song "Naah" by the same artists released in 2017 while lyrics have been written by Mellow D, Jaani, Badshah, Priya Saraiya, Jigar Saraiya and Bhargav Purohit, a debutante. Vocals were provided by Saraiya, Badshah, Shalmali Kholgade, Gurdeep Mehndi, Divya Kumar, Asees Kaur, Jubin Nautiyal, Papon, Harrdy Sandhu and Swasti Mehul, thus marking the second instance after Dum Laga Ke Haisha to not have Ayushmann Khurrana sing for any of his films.

The song "Don't Be Shy Again" is from an original track of the same title from the album 'Rouge' by Rouge, composed by Dr Zeus and written by Lola Olafis. This is the second time the song is being recreated after 2015's film Alone which was titled 'Touch My Body', sung by Aditi Singh Sharma and picturised on Bipasha Basu.

Track listing
No.	Title	Lyrics	Singer(s)	Length
1.	"Don't Be Shy Again"	Mellow D, Badshah	Badshah, Shalmali Kholgade, Gurdeep Mehendi	2:43
2.	"Naah Goriye" (Music: B Praak)	Jaani	Harrdy Sandhu, Swasti Mehul	3:04
3.	"Pyaar Toh Tha"	Priya Saraiya	Jubin Nautiyal, Asees Kaur	3:50
4.	"Tequila"	Jigar Saraiya	Divya Kumar, Jigar Saraiya	2:41
5.	"Zindagi"	Bhargav Purohit	Papon	3:14
6.	"Pyaar Toh Tha - Reprise (unreleased)"		Mustafa Zahid	3:51
Total length:				15:32

== Marketing and release ==
The theme poster of Bala was released on 27 May giving a release date.

With the release of the theatrical poster the release date was changed, the film was released in preview shows on 7 November 2019 and theatrically released in India on 8 November 2019.

== Controversies ==
After the trailer of the film was released, it was accused of copyright violation by the makers of Ujda Chaman, which also has a storyline similar to Bala. Ujda Chaman is an official remake of Kannada film Ondu Motteya Kathe.

On the release of its first song "Don't Be Shy", music composer-singer Dr Zeus claimed that the makers have used his track without giving due credit and acquiring any sort of rights.

== Reception ==
=== Critical response ===
Bala received generally positive reviews from critics with praise for the performances, writing, direction and the social message.

Bollywood Hungama gave 3.5 out of 5 and said, "Bala not only entertains thoroughly but also delivers a very important message that will surely be lapped up by the audiences." Ronak Kotecha of The Times of India rated the movie 4 stars on five and wrote, "'Bala' remains a light-hearted comedy with situations that are relatable. Just like the film's message, 'Bala' is beautiful even with its flaws, and never fails to entertain." Monika Rawal Kukreja of Hindustan Times reviewed, "Bala is a well-made film that stays true to its genre for most of the time. It makes right jokes at the time and leaves you in stitches more often that you’d expect."

Anna M. M. Vetticad of Firstpost praised the use of Kanpuriya Hindi in the film but was critical of its messaging, writing, “No one on Team Bala seems to have detected the irony in casting a light-skinned actor as Latika and painting her face black, rather than casting a black woman to play a black woman.” Kennith Rosario of The Hindu said, "A hollow film combed over with humour." India Today rated the movie 4 on 5 and said, "King Midas Ayushmann Khurrana delivers another blockbuster." News18 rated the movie 3 on 5 and said, "Bala could have been a crackerjack of a film but allows the novelty of its premise to wear out too easily. Bala, Kanpur’s “edible young man” (sic), certainly gets your attention, but does not manage to sweep you off your feet."

=== Box office ===
Bala's opening day domestic collection was ₹10.15 crore. On the second day, the film collected ₹15.73 crore. On the third day, the film collected ₹18.07 crore, taking total opening weekend collection to ₹43.95 million.

As of 9 December 2019, the film grossed ₹139.02 crore in India and ₹32.43 crore overseas for a worldwide gross of ₹171.5 crore.

== See also ==
- Kubja, referenced several times in the film
