= Naah =

2017 single by Harrdy Sandhu

Single by Harrdy Sandhu
- Language: Punjabi
- Released: 30 November 2017
- Studio: Studio Fuzz, Delhi
- Genre: Bhangra
- Length: 3:22
- Label: Sony Music India
- Composer: Jaani
- Lyricist: Jaani

Music video
- "Naah" on YouTube

"Naah" (transl. No) is a song by Indian singer Harrdy Sandhu. Written and composed by Jaani and arranged by B. Praak, it was released on November 30, 2017. The dance choreography was arranged and shot by Arvindr Khaira, while the music video features the Moroccan model Nora Fatehi as Sandhu's love interest.

== Reception ==
The song is one of the most viewed Punjabi songs on YouTube. As of 11 December 2021, it has garnered over 530 million views on YouTube.

== Bollywood ==
"Naah" was remade for the soundtrack of the Hindi film Bala, as "Naah Goriye", with singer Swasti Mehul. The music video featured Ayushmann Khurana, Harrdy Sandhu, and Sonam Bajwa grooving to the beats in the visuals.

== Personnel ==
- Song : Naah
- Artist : Harrdy Sandhu
- Starring : Harrdy Sandhu, Nora Fatehi
- Lyrics & Composition : Jaani
- Music : B Praak
- Recording Studio : Studio Fuzz, Delhi
- Mixing & Mastering : Eric Pillai (Future Sound Of Bombay)
- Video Director : Arvindr Khaira
- DOP : Bhanu Pratap
- Editor : Adele Pereira
- Colorist : Nadeem Akhtar
- Assistant Director : Harman Buttar
- Choreographer : Sahaj Singh, Shreoshi Kumar
- Hair Styling (Harrdy Sandhu) : Ali Khan
- Hair Styling & Make Up (Nora) : Juan Marcelo Pedrozo
- Costume Styling (Nora) : Sunakshi Kansal
- Publicity Creatives / Designs : Roop Kamal Singh & Aman Kalsi
- Digital Promotions : Lovish Kathuria
- Label : Sony Music India
