= Titliaan =

2020 single by Afsana Khan and Jaani

Single by Afsana Khan and Jaani
- Language: Punjabi, Urdu
- Released: 9 November 2020
- Length: 4:21 (music video); 3:16 (audio)
- Label: Desi Melodies
- Composer: Jaani
- Lyricist: Jaani

Music video
- "Titliaan" on YouTube

"Titliaan" (transl. Butterflies) is a Punjabi song released in 2020, with lyrics by Jaani and music by Avvy Sra, sung by Afsana Khan. The music video, featuring Harrdy Sandhu and Sargun Mehta, was directed by Arvindr Khaira. The song become a blockbuster in 2020, crossing over 333 million views on YouTube.

== Reception ==
The song reached number 15 on Billboard's Top Triller Global Chart in January 2021.

== Music video ==
The song starts with Harddy Sandhu being taken out of his captivity, while a masked woman is seen walking down the stairs, indicating that she is planning to kill Sandhu. The song starts with a dialogue voiced by the woman, who reveals herself to be Sargun Mehta, to Sandhu. A flashback sequence reveals that the duo was initially a couple. Harddy's character is shown to be a casanova, who keeps indulging with other women, while being married to Sargun. Sargun realises his character and opts out of her marriage, after giving several chances to her husband to be trustworthy. However, he doesn't change, and Sargun decides to take revenge on him and plans to kill him. At the end of the video, when the chained Sandhu is about to be murdered, something unexpected happens.

== Alternate version ==
"Titliaan Warga"

Single by Harrdy Sandhu and Jaani
- Language: Punjabi, Urdu
- Released: 6 January 2021
- Length: 4:01 (music video); 3:48 (audio)
- Label: Desi Melodies
- Composer: Jaani
- Lyricist: Jaani
- Producer: Avvy Sra

Music video
- "Titliaan Warga" on YouTube

Another version of the song, "Titliaan Warga" (transl. Like a butterfly), was released on 6 January 2021. The lyrics were again written by Jaani, and sung by Harrdy Sandhu, who had featured in the music video of the previous version. The music video, starring Harrdy Sandhu and Sargun Mehta, was directed by Arvindr Khaira.
