= Code Name: Tiranga =

2022 Indian film by Ribhu Dasgupta

- Theatrical release poster
- Directed by: Ribhu Dasgupta
- Written by: Ribhu Dasgupta
- Produced by: Bhushan Kumar; Krishan Kumar; Ribhu Dasgupta; Reliance Entertainment; Vivek B. Agrawal
- Starring: Parineeti Chopra; Harrdy Sandhu; Sharad Kelkar
- Cinematography: Tribhuvan Babu Sadineni
- Edited by: Sangeeth Prakash Varghese
- Music by: Score: Gilad Benamram; Songs: Jaidev Kumar; Vipin Patwa
- Production companies: T-Series Films; Reliance Entertainment; Film Hangar
- Distributed by: Reliance Entertainment
- Release date: 14 October 2022
- Running time: 134 minutes
- Country: India
- Language: Hindi
- Box office: ₹1.41 crore

Code Name: Tiranga is a 2022 Indian Hindi-language spy action drama film written and directed by Ribhu Dasgupta. The film is jointly produced by T-Series, Reliance Entertainment and Film Hangar. It stars Parineeti Chopra, Harrdy Sandhu and Sharad Kelkar. The film released on 14 October 2022, received mostly negative reviews from critics and was declared a box-office bomb.

== Plot ==
An Indian Research and Analysis Wing spy on an unfaltering and fearless mission across the Middle East in a race against time where sacrifice is her only choice.

== Cast ==
- Parineeti Chopra as Durga Devi Singh / Ismat
- Harrdy Sandhu as Dr. Mirza Ali
- Sharad Kelkar as Khalid Omar
- Rajit Kapur as Kabir Ali
- Dibyendu Bhattacharya as Ajay Bakshi
- Shishir Sharma as Iftikar Khan
- Sabyasachi Chakrabarty as Ranjit Kapoor
- Deesh Mariwala as Goyal
- Prabhat Kumar Sharma as Agent Nair
- Erin Gurdal as Mariyam, Omar’s Wife
- Nishant Thakur as Sharma
- Prasoon Arya as Afghani Groom
- Ayushi Thakur as Afghani Bride
- Musap Eyma as Omar's Son
- Hasan Yanik as Omar's Security Guard
- Vikas Tomar as Family Member
- Merve Ozel as Ferozi
- Ayub Azam as Sameer Rao
- Umar Suhail as Haqqani

== Production ==
The film's pre-production began around December 2020. It was announced, that Parineeti Chopra would play an undercover RAW agent in Ribhu Dasgupta's next. It is her second collaboration with Dasgupta post The Girl on the Train.

Harrdy Sandhu was cast opposite Chopra, while Sharad Kelkar was cast as the main antagonist.

Shooting of the film started in April 2021 in Turkey, including Istanbul, where a major portion of the film was shot.

== Soundtrack ==
Code Name: Tiranga

Soundtrack album by Jaidev Kumar and Vipin Patwa
- Released: 1 November 2022
- Recorded: 2022
- Studios: Neo Sounds & Saffron Touch Studio
- Genres: Romance; Soundtrack
- Length: 13:40
- Language: Hindi
- Label: T-Series
- Producer: Bhushan Kumar

The songs for the film are composed by Jaidev Kumar & Vipin Patwa and lyrics are penned by Kumaar, while a few lines of Bankim Chandra Chatterjee's Vande Mataram have been borrowed for a song of the same name. Background music score composed by Gilad Benamram.

No.	Title	Lyrics	Music	Singer(s)	Length
1.	"Ki Kariye"	Kumaar	Jaidev Kumar	Harrdy Sandhu, Sakshi Holkar	2:13
2.	"Dumadum Mast Kalandar"	Kumaar	Jaidev Kumar	Sardar Ali, Sanj V, Shahzad Ali, Gurucharan Singh	3:12
3.	"Vande Mataram"	Kumaar, Bankim Chandra Chatterjee	Vipin Patwa	Shankar Mahadevan	4:13
4.	"Yaar Ve"	Kumaar	Vipin Patwa	Arijit Singh	4:03
Total length:					13:40

== Release ==
The film was theatrically released on 14 October 2022 and the same was announced on 20 September 2022. After the theatrical release, the film was made available for streaming worldwide exclusively on Netflix from 16 December 2022.

== Reception ==
=== Critical response ===
The film received mostly negative reviews. On the review aggregator website Rotten Tomatoes, 0% of 8 critics' reviews are positive, with an average rating of 3.2/10.

While praising the performance, News 18 gave the film 3 out of 5 and wrote, "Ribhu Dasgupta’s direction film's script suffers from cliched and weak plot lines. It manages to engage the audience, taking full advantage of its breathtaking locations. Harrdy Sandhu is treat to watch while Parineeti Chopra slays as a RAW Agent."

Times of India gave the film 2.5 out of 5 and wrote, "It’s refreshing to watch Parineeti Chopra take on the villains with the sole intention of serving the country. Action choreography gets the maximum share of credit, as the story of this espionage thriller is quite predictable right from the beginning." India Today gave the film 1.5 out of 5 and noted, "Parineeti Chopra delivers a power-packed performance in Code Name: Tiranga. Her action scenes look flawless and well rehearsed. However, after a point, she fails to make an impact." They further noted, "There was absolutely no research put in behind a film about the country’s smartest, RAW."

NDTV gave 1.5 out of 5 and said, "Code Name Tiranga, is a series of yawn-inducing gunfights interspersed with fleeting sequences in which the characters are given lines to speak. In a film that is literally all over the place, the actors have their jobs cut out. They struggle to rise above the deafening din and be heard and understood." Firstpost gave 0.5 out of 5 and mentioned, "Writing a woman as the lead in an actioner is the only good idea to be found in the entire length and breadth of this thrill-less espionage ‘thriller’, Code Name: Tiranga is a disaster. The wait continues."

Scroll wrote, "Except for a point-of-view sequence in which Durga storms Khalid’s citadel, the 127-minute movie is too sluggishly staged to sell Parineeta Chopra as an action heroine. Harrdy Sandhu valiantly tries to be noticed in a film that is barely interested in him. The film isn’t interested in its own subject matter either." ABP News stated, "Parineeti's performance in the film deserves a special mention. She lends the right kind of pragmatic depth to the otherwise films about spies' who mostly have a straight face in all situations."

=== Box office ===
Code Name: Tiranga competed with the Ayushmann Khurrana-starred Doctor G, which was released on the same day. The film collected ₹0.15 crore at the domestic box office on its opening day. The film then collected ₹0.15 crore on day 2 and ₹0.07 crore on day 5. It ended its theatrical run on day 7 with a total collection of ₹0.70 crore.
