= Gaiety Theatre, Shimla =

Theatre in India

Gaiety Theatre
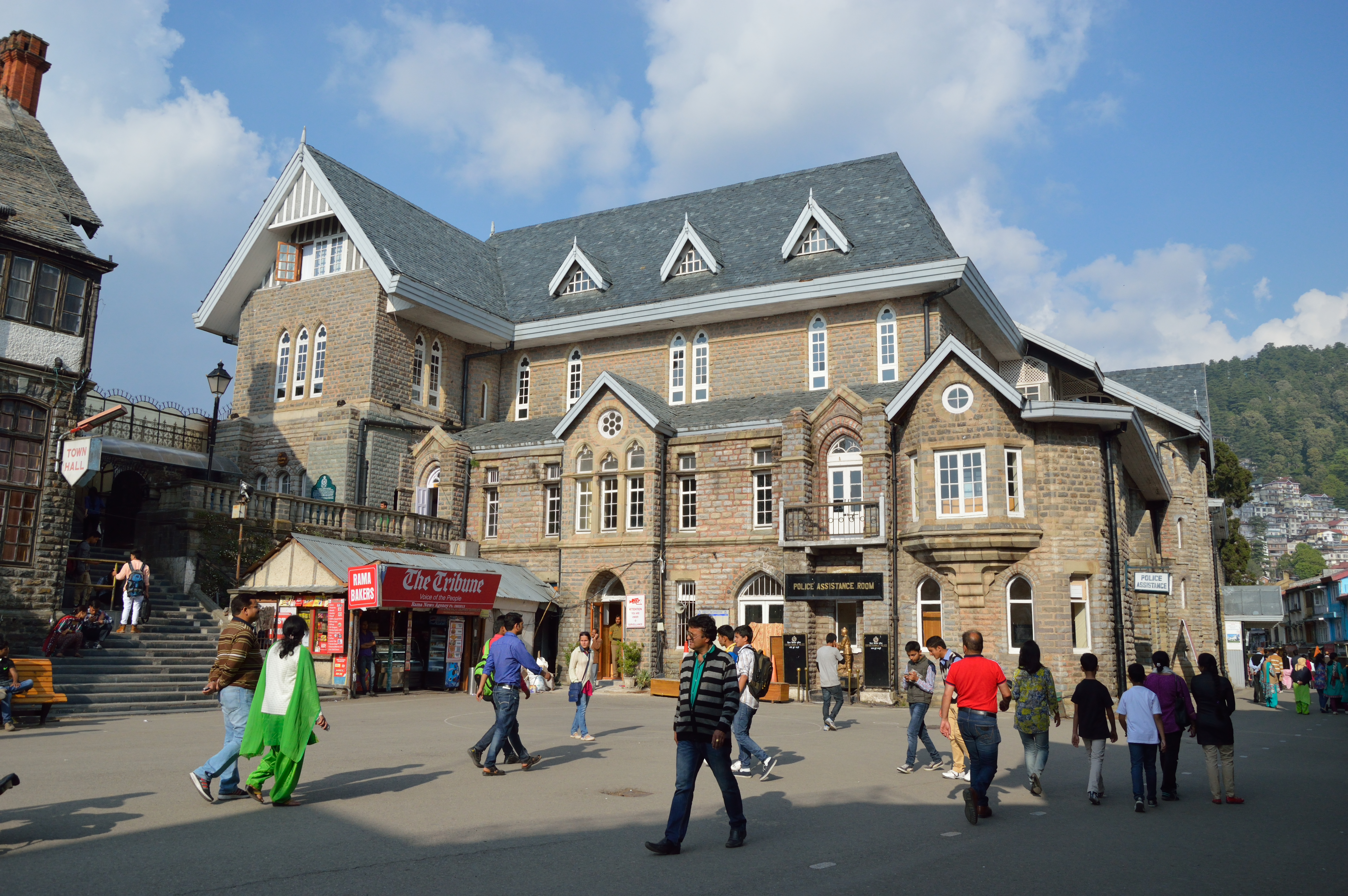
- Gaitey Theater as seen from Mall Road

- Location within Himachal Pradesh Gaiety Theatre, Shimla (India)

General information
- Architectural style: Gothic
- Location: The Ridge, Shimla, India
- Coordinates: 31.1047°N 77.1738°E
- Opened: 30 May 1887; 138 years ago

Design and construction
- Architect: Henry Irwin

Gaiety Theatre or Gaiety Heritage Cultural Complex is historic theatre and tourist destination in Shimla. It is located on Mall Road. It is the hub of cultural events of the state. It also very popular among Bollywood as many music videos and movies are often filmed here, including the 2019 song "Pachtaoge" by Arijit Singh and 2022 song "O Aasmanwale" by Jubin Nautiyal.

== History ==
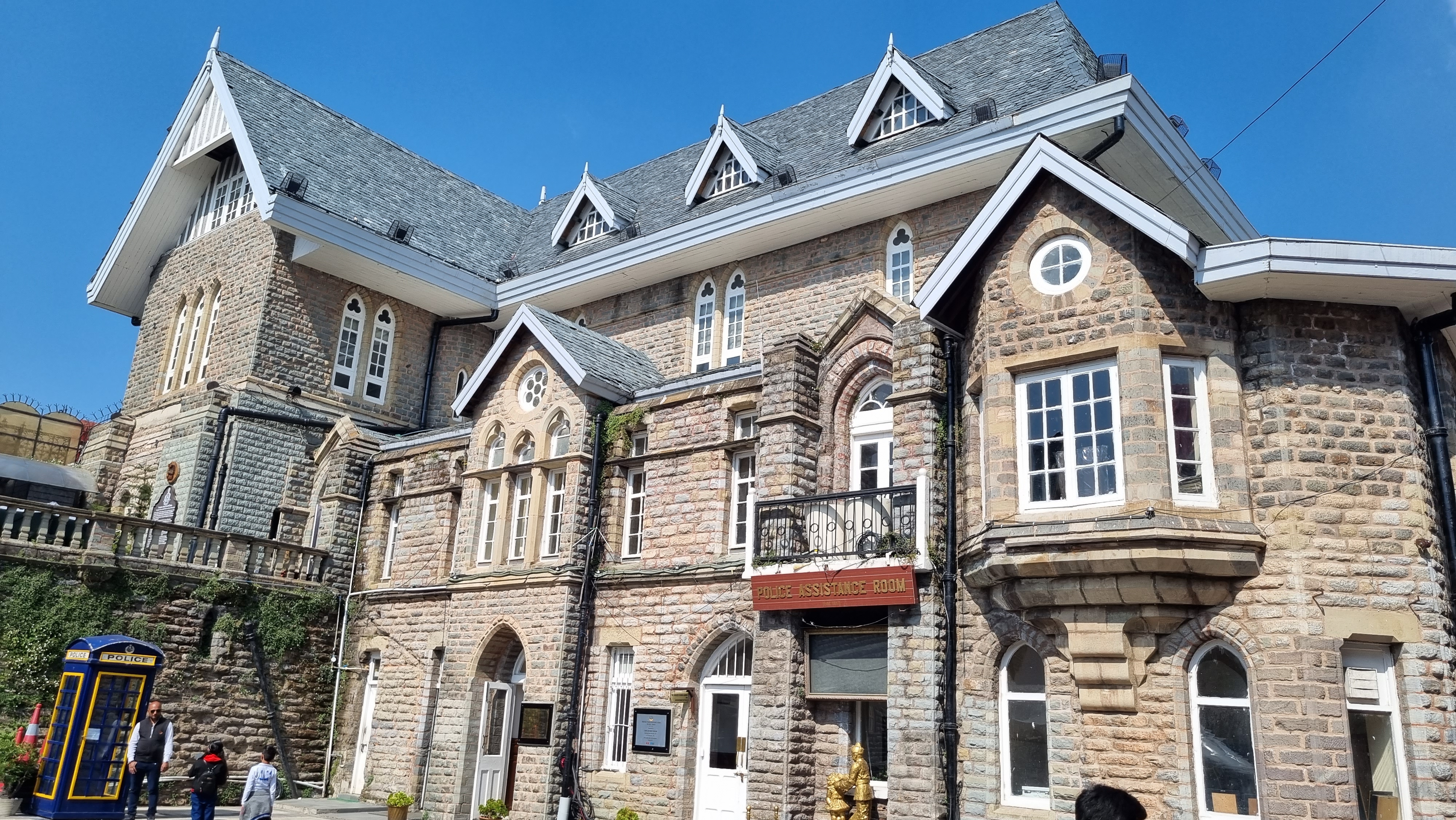
Gaiety Theatre or Gaiety Heritage Cultural Complex in Shimla, photographed in May 2023.

The Gaiety Theatre was opened on 30 May 1887, to a design by the English architect Henry Irwin. It is an example of the Gothic Revival style of architecture, derived from British Victorian examples. It was once part of the large town hall complex. It had a capacity of more than 300 people. Initially, it was a five-storey building with a theatre, ballroom, armoury, police office, bar, and galleries. After nearly two decades from its date of establishment, it was found that the building was structurally unsafe. It was partially demolished, but the Gaiety Theatre remains untouched. With a rich history to its credit, the theatre was the center for entertainment and socialisation, where Viceroy Lord Lytton wrote and staged a play called Walpole, and Rudyard Kipling acted in 'a scrap of paper'. Legends like Baden Powell, K.L. Sehgal, Prithvi Raj Kapoor, Balraj Sahni, Pran, Tom Alter, Manohar Singh, Jennifer Kendall, Anupam Kher, Naseeruddin Shah, Shahid Kapoor, Ayushmann Khurrana, Udit Narayan, Sonu Nigam, Mohit Chauhan and Shreya Ghoshal and others have also performed here. At one time the popularity of English plays in the theatre earned the nickname, 'Mecca of Theatre'.

== Current time ==
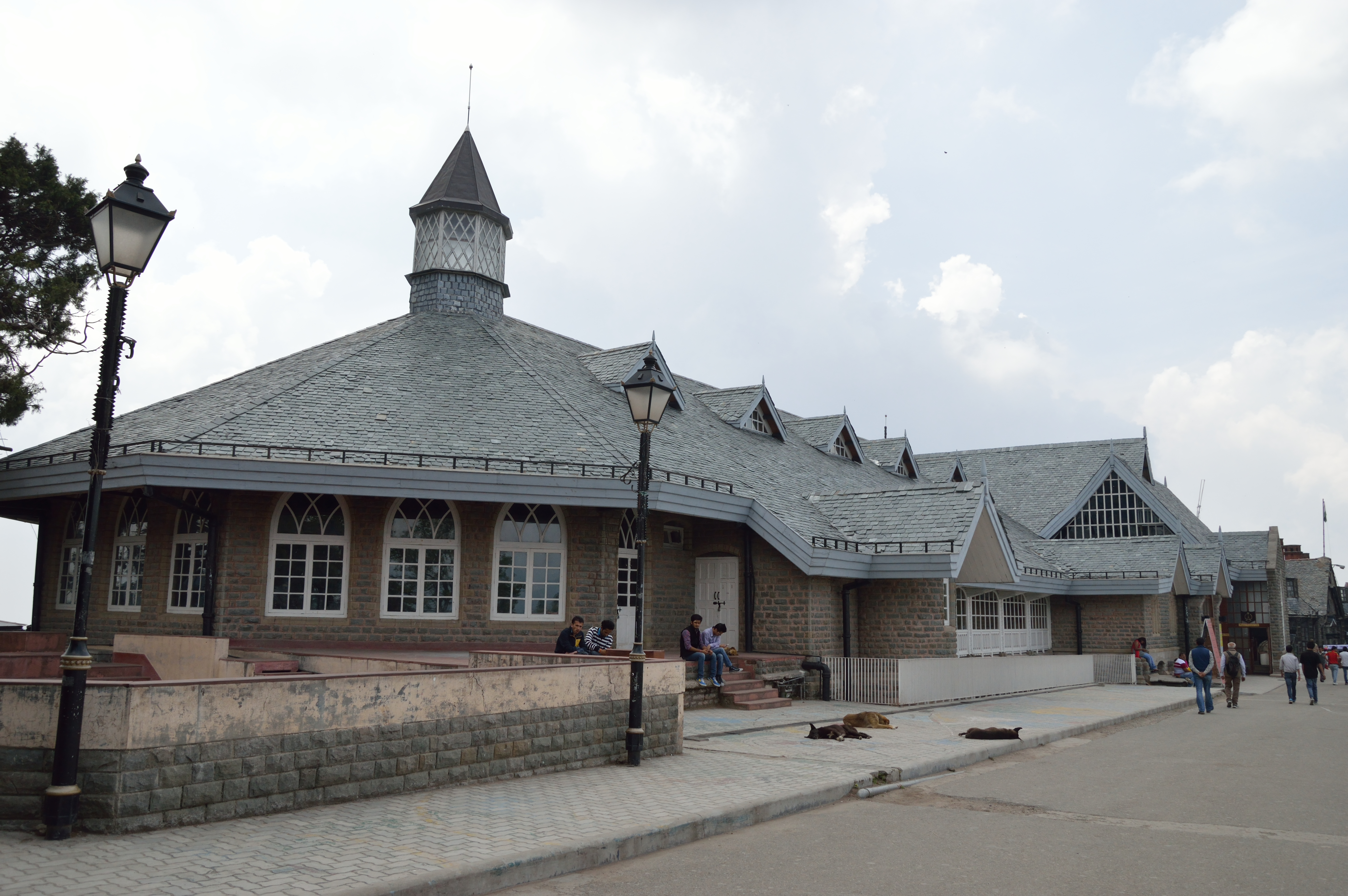
Gaiety Theatre view with its Open Theatre from The Ridge

The room has superb acoustics, and though it has undergone some minor renovations, the screen used is still the same as the one designed by the architect. With an array of venues, including an exhibition hall, an art gallery, a multi-purpose hall, an amphitheatre, and an old theatre hall, this is the hub of performing arts in the state. The complex witnesses a huge volume of visitors year-round due to its cultural prominence. Even today, several drama societies actively use the space, which has also hosted renowned Indian actors and singers. The complex supports painting, photography, dance, drama, theatrics, elocution, sculpture, and classical and folk music. At the same time Gaiety Complex also provides Shimla schools an opportunity to participate in the cultural activities organised here. More than a century-old symbol of art and culture, the Gaiety is primarily known for its social club.

=== Art Gallery ===
This gallery is attached to Lalit Kala Academy, New Delhi. It holds an exhibition of Nationally and Internationally renowned artists, highlighting modern and traditional art.

=== Exhibition Hall ===
This is another exhibition hall, having display boards to exhibit paintings, sculptures, crafts, and photographs of the people belonging to India.

=== Multi-Purpose Hall ===
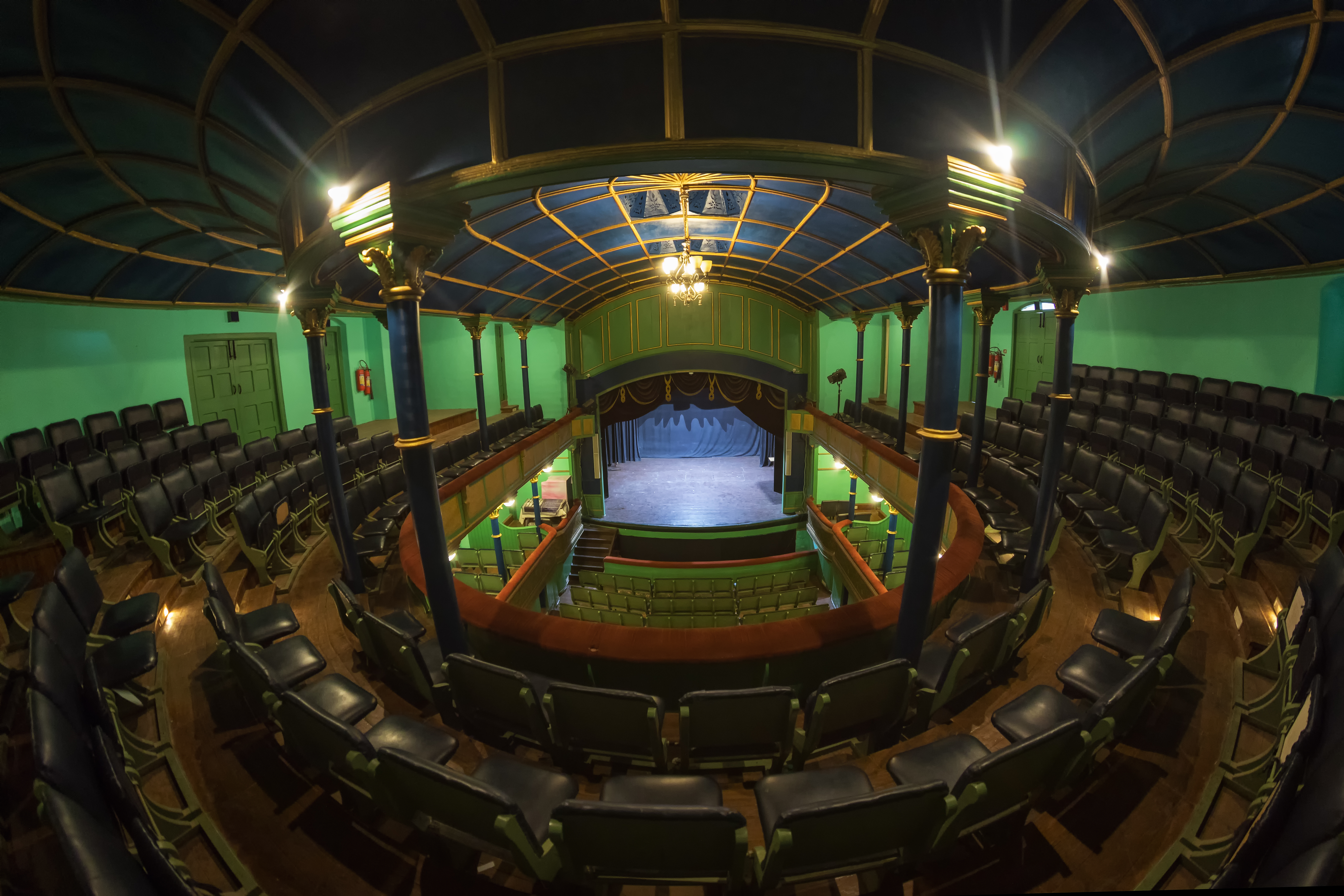
Gaiety Theatre multi-purpose hall from inside

The multi-purpose hall has a seating arrangement of 450 people, with all the modern facilities for indoor cultural activities.

=== Amphitheatre ===
The amphitheatre is an open-air theatre for enacting street plays small interaction and open-air cultural programs with seating for 100 people.

== In popular culture ==
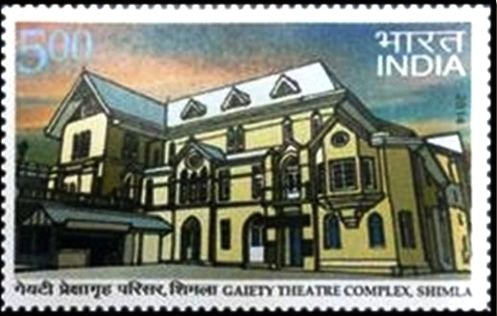
2014 India Post stamp featuring the theatre

Gaiety Theatre has been used as a setting location for various films and music videos, such as many scenes of the movie Tamasha movie, the music video for "Pachtaoge" song by Arijit Singh, the song "Main Nikla Gaddi Le Ke" from the movie Gadar- Ek Prem Katha and the 2022 song "O Aasmanwale" by Jubin Nautiyal were filmed here.
