= Harrdy Sandhu =

Indian singer and actor (born 1986)

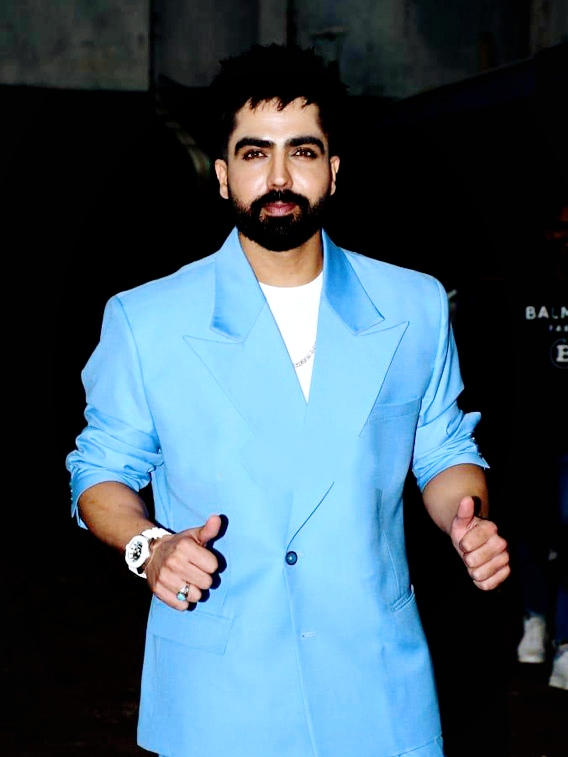
- Sandhu in 2022

Background information
- Born: Hardavinder Singh Sandhu; 6 September 1986 (age 40); Patiala, Punjab, India
- Genres: Filmi; Film score; Soundtrack; Jazz; Pop; Indian classical; EDM
- Occupations: Singer; actor; cricketer
- Labels: T-Series; Sony Music India; White Hill Music; Tips; YRF Music; Zee Music Company; Ishtaar Music; Saregama
- Cricket career

Cricket information
- Batting: Right-handed
- Bowling: Right-arm fast medium
- Role: Bowler

Domestic team information
- Years: Team
- 2005: Punjab

Career statistics
Competition	First class
Matches	3
Runs scored	11
Batting average	5.50
100s/50s	0/0
Top score	6
Balls bowled	558
Wickets	12
Bowling average	26.00
5 wickets in innings	0
10 wickets in match	0
Best bowling	6/134
Catches/stumpings	0/0
- Source: ESPNcricinfo

Hardavinder "Harrdy" Singh Sandhu (born 6 September 1986) is an Indian singer, actor and former cricketer who works in Punjabi and Hindi films. His first song was "Tequilla Shot", and he gained popularity with "Soch" (2013) and "Joker" (2014), which were written by Jaani and music composed by B Praak. Sandhu made his acting debut in Yaaran Da Katchup (2014). His song "Soch" was remade for the 2016 Bollywood film Airlift. His song "Naah" was remade for the film Bala as "Naah Goriye" with singer Swasti Mehul.

In 2021, he made his Hindi film debut with Kabir Khan's sports-drama 83 which is based on 1983 Cricket World Cup. He has since starred in the spy action drama Code Name: Tiranga (2022).

== Early life and career ==
Sandhu was born on 6 September 1986 in Patiala, Punjab to Jasvir Singh Sandhu and Balbir Kaur in a Jat family.

Sandhu played cricket for over a decade as a fast bowler, but suffered a severe elbow injury, forcing him to give up the game in 2007. He shifted his focus from sports to singing, took vocal training for eighteen months and released his first album, This is Harrdy Sandhu in 2011, composed by V. Grooves.

He made his debut as an actor with the Punjabi movie Yaaran Da Katchup in 2014. The movie proved to be an average grosser. Yet, he found success with tracks such as "Joker", "Backbone", "Horn Blow", "Yaar Ni Milya" with Jaani and B Praak, which proved to be big hits.

Later, in 2017, he released the track "Naah" featuring Nora Fatehi, with lyrics by Jaani and music by B Praak. In 2018 after huge success of "Naah", he released "Kya Baat Ay" with the same team, which also proved to be a huge hit. Both songs have since crossed 500+ million views on YouTube individually.

In later years, he released some other tracks such as "Superstar", "Dance Like", "Jee Karda", "Titliaan Warga", which were also hits. He also sang some tracks in Bollywood films such as "Chandigarh" from Good Newwz and "Naah Goriye" from Bala, the latter of which was a remake of his own song "Naah", which he released in 2017.

He made his Bollywood debut as an actor with sports drama film 83, which is based on India's victorious campaign at the 1983 Cricket World Cup. He played the role of former Team India fast bowler Madan Lal, who was an important part of the 1983 World Cup winning team. In November 2021, he released "Bijlee Bijlee" through Jaani's Desi Melodies, written and composed by Jaani, and produced by B Praak. The song, along with its hook dance step, became viral on Instagram reels with more than 1.4 million reels. In August 2022, Puma signed Harrdy Sandhu as their brand ambassador.

== Discography ==
=== Albums ===
Year	Album	Music Director	Lyricist	Label	Notes
2012	This Is Harrdy Sandhu	Mr. V Grooves	Various	Sony Music India	Debut album
2023	Pleasures	Arvindr Khaira	Raj Ranjodh	Harrdy Sandhu and Universal Music	Music video of "Psycho" from the album is the first Indian music video shot on virtual production.

=== Single ===
Year	Song	Music Director	Lyricist	Label	Notes
2012	Tequilla Shot	Mr. V Grooves	Manu Goraya	Sony Music India	From the album This Is Harrdy Sandhu
2012	Pehli Goli	Mr. V Grooves	Saini	Sony Music India	From the album This Is Harrdy Sandhu
2012	Aashqui Te Loan	Mr. V Grooves	Vikram Rehal	Sony Music India	From the album This Is Harrdy Sandhu
2013	Kudi Tu Pataka	JSL Singh	Baljinder Singh Mahant	JRS	with Ammy Virk, Babbal Rai, A kay, Ranjit Bawa, Prabh Gill
2013	Soch	B Praak	Jaani	JRS, T-Series	Featuring Himanshi Khurana in the music video
2014	Joker				
2015	Saah	Pav Dharia	Koki Deep	Speed Records	
2015	Without You (Soch)	Vaibhav Saxena, B Praak	Vaibhav Saxena, Jaani	T-Series	An official re-creation of "Soch", commissioned by T-Series
2015	Naa Ji Naa	B Praak	Jaani	Sony Music India	
2016	Hornn Blow	B Praak	Jaani	T-Series, JRS	
2017	Backbone	B Praak	Jaani	Sony Music India	
2017	Naah	B Praak	Jaani	Sony Music India	Featuring Nora Fatehi in the music video
2017	Yaar Ni Milyaa	B Praak	Jaani	White Hill Music	
2018	Kya Baat Ay	B Praak	Jaani	Sony Music India	Featuring Carolina Moural in the music video
2019	Yaar Superstar	Meet Sehra	Babbu	Sony Music India	
2019	She Dance Like	B Praak	Jaani	Sony Music India	Featuring Lauren Gottlieb in the music video
2020	Jee Karr Daa	Akull	Mellow D	Sony Music India	Featuring Amyra Dastur in the music video
2021	Titliaan Warga	Avvy Sra	Jaani	Desi Melodies	After the massive success of the song "Titliaan", in whose music video Sandhu starred alongside Sargun Mehta, this sequel was released
2021	Bijlee Bijlee	B Praak	Jaani	Desi Melodies	Featuring Palak Tiwari
2022	Kudiyan Lahore Diyan	B Praak	Jaani	Desi Melodies	Featuring Aisha Sharma in the music video
2024	Tu Ru Ruu	Bunny	Sagar	Desi Melodies	
2025	Baby	Prodgk	Kaptaan	Harrdy Sandhu Official	
2025	Noor	Sagar & Bunny	Sagar	Harrdy Sandhu Official	Featuring Shehnaaz Gill in the music video

=== Film ===
Year	Song	Film	Composer(s)	Co-singer(s)	Lyrics	Label
2016	"Ki Kariye Nachna Aaonda Nahi"	Tum Bin II	Ankit Tiwari	Neha Kakkar, Raftaar	Manoj Muntashir	T-Series
2018	"Little Little"	Yamla Pagla Deewana: Phir Se	D Soldierz	Solo	D Soldierz	Saregama
2018	"Tu Jaane Na"	Ishqaa	Money Aujla	Solo	Maninder Kailey	Times Music
2019	"Naah Goriye"	Bala	Jaani, B Praak	Swasti Mehul, Sonam Bajwa, Ayushmann Khurrana	Jaani	Sony Music India
2019	"Speaker Phaat Jaye"	Total Dhamaal	Gourov-Roshin	Abuzer Akhtar, Jonita Gandhi, Aditi Singh Sharma	Kumaar	Saregama
2019	"Chandigarh Mein"	Good Newwz	Tanishk Bagchi, Badshah	Badshah, Lisa Mishra, Asees Kaur	Tanishk Bagchi, Badshah	Zee Music Company
2022	"Ki Kariye"	Code Name: Tiranga	Jaidev Kumar	Sakhsi Holkar	Kumaar	T-Series
2022	"Kya Baat Ay 2.0"	Govinda Naam Mera	Tanishk Bagchi, B Praak	Nikhita Gandhi	Jaani	Sony Music India
2026	"Wow"	Hai Jawani Toh Ishq Hona Hai	Tanishk Bagchi, Rony Ajnali, Gill Machhrai	Kiran Bajwa	Rony Ajnali, Gill Machhrai	Tips
2026	"Vallah"	Cocktail 2	Pritam, Amitabh Bhattacharya	Bayanni	Amitabh Bhattacharya, Rony Ajnali, Gill Machhrai	Universal Music India

== Filmography ==
Year	Title	Role	Language	Notes
2014	Yaaran Da Katchup	Harrdy Gill	Punjabi	
2017	Mera Mahi NRI	Sherry	Punjabi	
2019	Bala	Himself	Hindi	Special appearance in the music video of the song "Naah Goriye"
2019	Good Newwz	Himself	Hindi	Special appearance in the music video of the song "Chandigarh Mein"
2021	83	Madan Lal	Hindi	
2022	Code Name: Tiranga	Dr. Mirza Ali	Hindi	

== Awards and nominations ==
Year	Award	Category	Work	Result	ref
2014	PTC Punjabi Music Awards	Most Romantic Ballad of the Year	Soch	Won	
2014	PTC Punjabi Music Awards	Most Popular Song of the Year	Soch	Won	
2014	PTC Punjabi Music Awards	Best Music Video	Soch	Won	
2015	PTC Punjabi Film Awards	Best Debut (Male)	Yaaran Da Katchup	Nominated	
2015	Punjabi Music Awards	Most Popular Song of the Year	Joker	Nominated	
2015	Punjabi Music Awards	Most Romantic Ballad of the Year	Joker	Nominated	
