= Pachtaoge =

2019 Hindi song

Single by Arijit Singh

from the album Jaani Ve
- Language: Hindi
- Released: 23 August 2019
- Recorded: 2018
- Genre: Indian pop
- Length: 3:47
- Label: T-Series
- Songwriters: B Praak; Jaani
- Producer: Bhushan Kumar

Arijit Singh singles chronology
"Le Ja Tu Kahin" (2018)	"Pachtaoge" (2019)	"Intezaar" (2019)

"Pachtaoge" (transl. "You Will Regret") is a 2019 Hindi song, sung by Arijit Singh. The music is by B Praak and the lyrics are written by Jaani.

== Background and release ==
Originally, the song was sung by Atif Aslam, but was re-recorded by Arijit Singh. The song was released on 23 August 2019 by T-series on YouTube.

== Music video ==
The video was directed by Arvindr Khaira and shot in Shimla in June 2019. The main dance scenes of the song were shot in Gaiety Theatre of Shimla. It is about love, betrayal and heartbreak. The song's music video features Vicky Kaushal, Nora Fatehi as the protagonists, and Prabh Uppal playing the role of antagonist. Vicky and Nora as couple and Prabh as boyfriend of Nora.

== Credits and personnel ==
- Song – Pachtaoge
- Album – Jaani Ve
- Starring – Vicky Kaushal & Nora Fatehi
- Featuring – Prabh Uppal
- Singer – Arijit Singh
- Lyrics & Composer – Jaani
- Music – B Praak
- Mix Master – Gurinder Guri
- Recording – Akaash Bambar
- Music Label – T-Series
- Guitars By – Shomu Seal
- Flute By – Paras Nath
- Video Director – Arvindr Khaira
- Dop – R Dee
- Editor/Grade – Zipsi
- Asst. Director- Satnam, Sukhman Sukhu, Har G
- Jaani's Assistant – Gurashish Romana Steadicam: Amaninder Singh
- Production – Fateh Films & Sai Film
- Photographer – Shivam
- Choreographer – Sumit
- Art Director – Pinky Art
- Prabh Uppal costume – Anupama Garg
- Vicky Kaushal and Nora Fatehi costume – Amandeep Kaur
