= Govinda Naam Mera =

2022 Indian film by Shashank Khaitan

- Official release poster
- Directed by: Shashank Khaitan
- Written by: Shashank Khaitan
- Produced by: Karan Johar; Hiroo Yash Johar; Apoorva Mehta; Shashank Khaitan
- Starring: Vicky Kaushal; Bhumi Pednekar; Kiara Advani
- Cinematography: Vidhushi Tiwari
- Edited by: Charu Shree Roy
- Music by: Score: John Stewart Eduri; Songs: Meet Bros; Tanishk Bagchi; B Praak; Sachin–Jigar; Rochak Kohli
- Production companies: Viacom18 Studios; Dharma Productions; Mentor Disciple Films
- Distributed by: Disney+ Hotstar
- Release date: 16 December 2022
- Running time: 131 minutes
- Country: India
- Language: Hindi

Govinda Naam Mera (transl. Govinda Is My Name) is a 2022 Indian Hindi-language comedy thriller film written and directed by Shashank Khaitan and produced by Karan Johar, Apoorva Mehta, and Shashank Khaitan under the banner of Dharma Productions, in association with Viacom18 Studios. The film stars Vicky Kaushal, Bhumi Pednekar, and Kiara Advani. It premiered on 16 December 2022 on Disney+ Hotstar to positive reviews.

== Plot ==
Govind A. "Govinda" Waghmare (Vicky Kaushal) works as a backup dancer for Bollywood films in Mumbai, and wishes to be a dance choreographer someday. He has a bitter relationship with his wife Gauri (Bhumi Pednekar), and wants to divorce her, to be with his girlfriend Suku (Kiara Advani) who is also a dancer. Gauri demands that in order to divorce her, he would first have to pay her ₹2 crores, returning the amount paid to him in dowry at the time of their marriage. Gauri has a boyfriend named Baldev, who is an insurance agent.

Govinda's father, Gopi Vishwakarma, was a famous fight choreographer and his mother, Asha Waghmare, was a backup dancer. They fell in love while working together in films and got married. When Govinda was little, Gopi died in an accident and Charulata and Vishnu Vishwakarma, Gopi's wife and son from his first marriage, claim that they are the rightful owner of the bungalow which Gopi had left for Govinda and Asha in his will. The Vishwakarma family claim that Gopi's marriage with Asha was a sham and was just part of a film shooting. It has led to a long running legal dispute between the two families over ownership of the bungalow. Asha has been pretending to be paralyzed in order to gain sympathy and move the case in their favour.

Govinda thinks of killing Gauri and takes a gun from Inspector Javed, an old friend of Gopi's, but he cannot muster the courage to kill her. Javed demands ₹2 lakhs for the gun but Govinda is unable to pay him and gets threatened by him regularly. Govinda and Suku get an opportunity to choreograph a music video for the rich producer Ajit Dharkar's drug-addicted son Sandeep aka Sandy. The music video is made, but Govinda and Suku have more screen time in it compared to Sandy, which angers Ajit and he demands that they repay him ₹30 lakhs, which was the amount spent in making the song.

Sometime later, Govinda finds Sandy injured in his car post an accident. With him being unconscious, Govinda finds and steals drugs from his car, which are worth crores of rupees and Suku suggests they sell them. They both go to Govinda's house and are shocked to find Gauri lying dead on the floor, seemingly murdered. They are clueless as to who may have killed her, and bury her in the garden outside the house, removing all other evidence. The next morning, Manju, the maidservant discovers a piece of broken glass on the floor with blood stains on it. She suspects Govinda for killing Gauri and reports it to Inspector Javed.

It is revealed that Suku had been working for Vishnu and passing on information to him which would help him in the case regarding the bungalow. Baldev confronts Govinda and says that he suspects him for killing Gauri as he knows that she had made a life insurance worth ₹2 crores with Govinda as the nominee, and he says that he knew nothing about it. On their lawyer Kaustabh's suggestion, Govinda and Asha decide to sell the bungalow to the Vishwakarma family for ₹2 crores and settle somewhere else. Meanwhile, Sandy is shocked to find the drugs missing from his car. Ajit receives an anonymous tip that Govinda has the drugs, and has him detained by the police, along with everyone else who knows him.

The police search for the drugs at his house, but cannot find them. On being questioned, Suku says that Govinda has murdered Gauri and buried her. The police dig up the ground outside the house but cannot find Gauri's body, which leaves Suku shocked. Moreover, Govinda unexpectedly claims that he and Gauri are already divorced and he doesn't know of her whereabouts. Some of the drugs are surprisingly found at Inspector Javed's house, leading the police to believe that he had stolen it. The Vishwakarma family, after acquiring the bungalow, finds out that Gopi had illegally acquired the land in which it was built and that a school will be built there. This creates problems for them as they have already sold the bungalow to a real estate developer for ₹150 crores. A raid is conducted at Ajit's house and on finding more drugs in his possession, the police detain him.

Six months later, Suku, Vishnu and Charulata receive a call from Govinda to come and meet him in Thailand. On reaching there, they are shocked to find Govinda living a luxurious life, along with Asha and Gauri, who is alive. Govinda reveals that he had found out that Suku had betrayed him and was working for Vishnu. He, along with Gauri and Asha, had made an elaborate plan in which they would fake Gauri's death to get the insurance money, steal and sell the drugs from Sandy by framing Inspector Javed, and sell the bungalow for a hefty sum, fully aware that it was illegally acquired. Baldev and Kaustubh were also in on the plan and had received their respective shares. The film ends with Suku, Vishnu and Charulata falling unconscious as their drinks were drugged, and Govinda and the others walking off, laughing.

== Cast ==
- Vicky Kaushal as Govind "Govinda" Waghmare, Gauri's husband and Suku's boyfriend
- Bhumi Pednekar as Gauri Waghmare, Govinda's wife
- Kiara Advani as Suku Shetty, Govinda's girlfriend
- Sayaji Shinde as Ajit Dharkar
- Renuka Shahane as Asha Waghmare, Govinda's mother and Gopi's second wife
- Dayanand Shetty as Inspector Javed
- Amey Wagh as Kaustubh Godbole, Govinda's cousin
- Aseem Hattangadi as Advocate Bhide
- Girish Oak as ACP Sunil Kulkarni
- Jeeva Ranjeet as Sandeep Dharkar aka Sandy, Ajit's son
- Viraj Ghelani as Baldev Chaddha aka Ballu, Gauri's boyfriend
- Wilson Tiger as Gopi Vishwakarma
- Veenah Naair as Charulata Vishwakarma, Gopi's first wife and Govinda's step-mother
- Akshay Gunawat as Vishnu Vishwakarma, Gopi's elder son and Govinda's half-brother
- Trupti Khamkar as Manju
- Umedh Singh as Inspector Satish Bhosle
- Shashank Khaitan as Anand Joshi, builder
- Ranbir Kapoor as himself (special appearance in and after the song "Bijli")
- Amy Aela (special appearance in the song "Bijli")
- Ganesh Acharya as himself (Special Appearance)

== Production ==
=== Development ===
It was announced in January 2020 that Karan Johar and Shashank Khaitan were set to come together again after several collaborations for a spy comedy titled Mr. Lele starring Varun Dhawan, Bhumi Pednekar and Janhvi Kapoor. A first look poster was later released featuring Dhawan. However, the project was shelved a few months later due to the COVID-19 pandemic in India. In January 2021, the film was revived with Pednekar rejoining the cast, Vicky Kaushal replacing Dhawan and Kiara Advani replacing Kapoor.

=== Filming ===
Principal photography of the film begun in Mumbai in March 2021. Filming was halted for several weeks in April when both Kaushal and Pednekar tested positive for COVID-19 in the second wave of COVID-19 pandemic. Shoot resumed in June 2021. A song from the film was shot during the end of August 2021 on board the Roll-on/roll-off to Alibaug. Several scenes featuring Kaushal and Advani were also filmed in Pondicherry.

== Soundtrack ==
Govinda Naam Mera

Soundtrack album by Meet Bros, Tanishk Bagchi, B Praak, Sachin–Jigar and Rochak Kohli
- Released: 14 December 2022
- Recorded: 2021–2022
- Genre: Feature film soundtrack
- Length: 32:14
- Language: Hindi
- Label: Sony Music India

The music of the film is composed by Meet Bros, Tanishk Bagchi, B Praak, Sachin–Jigar and Rochak Kohli.

The film score is composed by John Stewart Eduri.

The song "Kyaa Baat Haii 2.0" was recreated from the 2018 track Kya Baat Ay which was sung by Harrdy Sandhu, written by Jaani and composed by B Praak.

Track listing
| No. | Title | Lyrics | Music | Singer(s) | Length |
|---|---|---|---|---|---|
| 1. | "Bijli" | Vayu | Sachin-Jigar | Mika Singh, Neha Kakkar, Sachin-Jigar | 2:54 |
| 2. | "Bana Sharabi" | Tanishk Bagchi | Tanishk Bagchi | Jubin Nautiyal | 3:48 |
| 3. | "Kyaa Baat Haii 2.0" | Jaani | Tanishk Bagchi, B Praak | Harrdy Sandhu, Nikhita Gandhi | 2:56 |
| 4. | "Pappi Jhappi" | Kumaar | Meet Bros | Meet Bros, Harry Arora | 2:58 |
| 5. | "Hello" | Gurpreet Saini | Rochak Kohli | Rochak Kohli | 3:53 |
| 6. | "Bijli" (Remix) | Vayu | Sachin-Jigar | Sachin-Jigar, Dj Chetas, Mika Singh, Neha Kakkar | 2:54 |
| 7. | "Kyaa Baat Haii 2.0" (Remix) | Jaani | Tanishk Bagchi, B Praak, Kimera | Tanishk Bagchi, B Praak, Kimera, Harrdy Sandhu, Nikhita Gandhi | 2:45 |
| 8. | "Bana Sharabi" (Female Version) | Tanishk Bagchi | Tanishk Bagchi | Tanishk Bagchi, Neeti Mohan | 3:49 |
| 9. | "Bana Sharabi" (Reprise) | Tanishk Bagchi | Tanishk Bagchi | Tanishk Bagchi, Lakshay Kapoor | 2:29 |
| 10. | "Bana Sharabi" (Instrumental) | Tanishk Bagchi | Tanishk Bagchi | Instrumental | 3:48 |
| Total length: | | | | | 32:14 |

== Marketing and release ==
In November 2021, Karan Johar announced the film with the new current title as well as three character posters which introduced Kaushal as Govinda Waghmare, Pednekar as his wife and Advani as his girlfriend. In August 2022, it was announced that the film was heading for a streaming release on Disney+ Hotstar sometime in November 2022, with the film's digital rights being sold for ₹62 crores. The film was premiered on 16 December 2022 on Disney+ Hotstar.

== Reception ==
Archika Khurana of The Times of India rated the film 3.5 stars out of 5 and wrote, "Right from Vicky and Kiara shaking a leg to the track Pappi Jhappi to donning matching outfits, everything reminds you of the madness and quirks of the 90s comedies. Govinda Naam Mera is definite crowd-pleaser that entertains with ample laughter, confusion and comedy". Sonil Dedhia of News 18 rated the film 3.5 out of 5 stars and wrote "Govinda Naam Mera is the kind of low-brow humour you enjoy without pretensions. Kaushal steal the show his energy levels coupled with self-assured act. Advani pairs off very well with Kaushal. She is not just a glamour quotient here but is in super form. Pedenkar has limited screen time but is simply outstanding".

Bollywood Hungama rated the film 3 stars out of 5 and wrote, "Govinda Naam Mera rests on a far-fetched and illogical second half. But thanks to the performances, fast-paced narrative and some unexpected comic and thrilling moments, it turns out to be a watchable film". Taru B Masand of Times Now gave 3 stars out of 5 and wrote, "It is a family entertainer and a perfect pick for a movie night. Despite the slow build-up, the film emerges as a winner with its comic timings, a cameo by Ranbir Kapoor, brilliant climax, and just a perfect cast". Prateek Sur of Outlook rated the film 3 stars out of 5 and wrote, "Govinda Naam Mera saves itself with a killer climax. While some of the twists you figure out along the way, a few of those twists when they come in the climax, you're really left with a feeling of immense satisfaction". Parina Taneja of India TV rated the film 2.5 stars out of 5 and wrote, "Govinda Naam Mera, starring Vicky Kaushal, Kiara Advani and Bhumi Pednekar, is not just about comedy but is loaded with many twists and turns which makes it a quirky thriller".

Shubham Kulkarni of Koimoi rated the film 3 out of 5 stars and wrote, "Govinda Naam Mera is surprisingly a very smart movie that draws the blueprint of the past but also realises the time it is made in. Kaushal is so effortlessly blends in this setup and believes in Govinda Waghmare, Advani is growing immensely she impresses in whatever she is given and you are invested in what part she has in the story rather than being a glamourous [sic] girlfriend, Pednekar is fun to watch but hope there was more screentime of her because she manages to turn heads even with the limited space. Rest everyone including Shahane, Wagh, Khamkar and Shetty are amazing to watch". Rohit Bhatnagar of The Free Press Journal rated the film 3 out of 5 stars and wrote "Govinda Naam Mera is a trippy laugh riot with a surprising events, but still a one-time watch. Vicky succeeds but somewhere he falls too. His ‘taporigiri’ act looks pushy in a few scenes. Kiara is watchable and reminds one of Karisma Kapoor from David Dhawan films in the 1990s. Bhumi, has less screen time, does her job well and earns brownie points simply because she is a Maharashtrian originally. Shahane is a treat to watch, Wagh and Khamkar play their respective parts with sincerity. Ranbir Kapoor's cameo just lights up the whole canvas".

Himesh Mankad of Pinkvilla rated the film 2 out of 5 stars and wrote "Govinda Naam Mera rides on a rather flat narrative where nothing really comes together apart from the final 20 minutes, Kaushal’s does well to play his part of Govinda, Advani delivers in a big way and certainly stands out from the rest with her act in the film. Pednekar does well as a dominating wife, but the character doesn’t have enough shades". Tushar Joshi of India Today rated the film 2 out of 5 stars and wrote "Govinda Naam Mera is a letdown. The experience in the first half, is messy however second half, especially the climax and the last one hour, are the best parts of the film. Kaushal aces in every scene, giving it his all. Be it the comic or the romantic moments, he gives this film his all as Govinda Waghmare, Bhumi’s scenes with Vicky in the first half are a major highlight, Advani has a few scenes where she shines, but overall she’s reduced to playing the pretty girl in distress. Kapoor's cameo that momentarily lifts the vibe of the film".
