= B Praak =

Indian singer and music producer (born 1986)

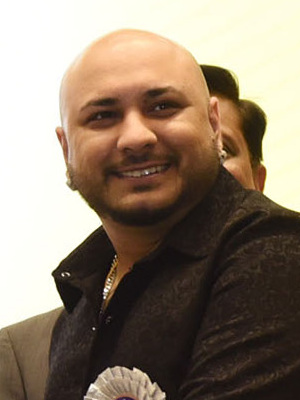
- Praak in 2021
- Born: Pratik Bachan; 7 February 1986 (age 40); Chandigarh, India
- Occupations: Singer; composer; music director; music producer
- Years active: 2009–present
- Musical career
- Origin: Punjab, India
- Genres: Soundtrack; Sad; Romantic; Rock; Indian classical
- Instruments: Vocals; keyboards
- Labels: Speed Records; Desi Melodies; Tips; T-Series; Sony Music India; Zee Music Company

Pratik Bachan (born 7 February 1986), best known by his stage name B Praak (formerly Prakky B), is an Indian singer, music director, composer and music producer associated with the Punjabi and Hindi music industry. He started his career as a music producer, and later debuted as a singer with the song "Mann Bharrya". He has won many awards including a National Film Award and two Filmfare Awards.

He is a frequent collaborator with lyricist Jaani. He entered into Hindi cinema in 2019 with two songs as singer in the films Kesari and Good Newwz starring Akshay Kumar, and as a guest composer in the satire Bala.

== Life and music career ==
Praak was born as Pratik Bachan in Chandigarh. His father, Varinder Bachan (−2021), was a Punjabi and Hindi music producer and composer of pop and folk music and Hindu bhajans, who also worked in Punjabi films such as Jatt Punjab Daa.

He started his career as music director with name of "Prakky B". He produced music for a few songs, but songs got no recognition. In 2012, he met lyricist Jaani and started collaborating with him under the stage name B Praak. In 2013, they released their first song "Soch" sung by Harrdy Sandhu and composed by him.

In later years, he composed and produced music for numerous of tracks of singers like Jassie Gill, Harrdy Sandhu, Amrinder Gill, Gippy Grewal, Diljit Dosanjh, Ammy Virk etc. with lyrics by Jaani. He composed tracks such as "Taara", "Joker", "Na Ji Na", "Ik Saal", "Do You Know", "Supna", "Backbone", "Horn Blow" and many more.

He later debuted as singer in 2018 with the single "Mann Bharrya". He also sang more songs such as "Bewafaai", "Mastaani" and composed tracks such as "Qismat", "Naah", "Kya Baat Ay", "Hath Chummne", "Guitar Sikhda" in same and following year. He also produced music for Qismat, a film inspired by his song of the same name, for the first time in his career with lyrics by Jaani.

Praak made his Hindi film debut in 2019, first as a singer with the song "Teri Mitti" from the Hindi film Kesari starring Akshay Kumar and Parineeti Chopra, written by Manoj Muntashir and composed by Arko Pravo Mukherjee, and months later as a composer with a recreation of his song "Naah", titled Naah Goriye, which was featured on the soundtrack of the Ayushmann Khurrana-starrer Bala. During this time, he also crooned a promotional song featuring Kumar for his second song as a singer, "Ali Ali", which was featured on the soundtrack of the film Blank and was again composed by Mukherjee, while next crooning a remake of the popular song "O Saaki Saaki" for Batla House, written and composed by Tanishk Bagchi, where he sang alongside Neha Kakkar and Tulsi Kumar, in his first ensemble effort. He next reunited with Kumar for the comedy-drama film Good Newwz, crooning the song "Maana Dil", composed by Bagchi and written by Rashmi Virag. Additionally, he recorded a reprise version of the song "Dilbara" from the 2019 remake of the film Pati Patni Aur Woh, which was composed by Sachet–Parampara and written by Navi Ferozpurwala, and again in his duet with Sunidhi Chauhan for the song "Bharat Salaam", which was written and composed by Mithoon, and featured on the Hindi version soundtrack of Hotel Mumbai.

In the same year he released "Pachtaoge", sung by Arijit Singh, composed by him and written by Jaani. The music video featured Vicky Kaushal and Nora Fatehi, making it his first Hindi music video collaboration. In the same year he released the single "Filhall", featuring Akshay Kumar and Nupur Sanon in the music video, sung and composed by Praak with lyrics by Jaani.

In the same year, he sang his first Telugu song "Suryudivo Chandrudivo", for the film Sarileru Neekevvaru featuring Mahesh Babu.

In 2020, he released tracks such as "Kuch Bhi Ho Jaye", "Besharam Bewaffa", "Kyon", and "Baras Baras", and he composed the songs for Ammy Virk's film Sufna with lyrics by Jaani. He also performed some of the songs.

In early 2021, he released the single "Mazaa", and later in the same year, "Baarish Ki Jaaye", featuring Nawazuddin Siddiqui and Sunanda Sharma in the music video, with lyrics by Jaani. Praak won the National Film Award for Best Male Playback Singer in 2021 for his rendition of "Teri Mitti" at the 67th National Film Awards.

In July 2021, he released the sequel to the song "Filhall", "Filhaal 2: Mohabbat".

In July 2021, he sang "Ranjha" for the film Shershaah that starred Sidharth Malhotra and Kiara Advani. The song was the 2nd most streamed song in 2021 on Spotify in India. Another song was released from the film Shershaah named "Mann Bharrya 2.0" which was a recreation of B Praak's Single "Mann Bharrya", recreated by B Praak himself along with Jaani. The song was streamed more than 50 million times on Spotify.

In September 2021, a sequel to his much popular soundtrack of the film Qismat 2 was released, in which he served as music director for all songs and composer for two songs with lyrics by Jaani.

In 2022, his first Bollywood project as music director came in Akshay Kumar's Bachchan Pandey in which he sang two songs "Meri Jaan Meri Jaan", "Saare Boli Bewafa" with lyrics by Jaani.

== Personal life ==
In 2019, he married Meera in Chandigarh. They have had two sons together: Adabb (born 2020), and Fazza who died at the time of birth in 2022.

== Singles ==
=== As singer and music director ===
Year	Song	Lyricist	Composer	Language	Notes	Record label
2016	Surma to Sandals	Jaani	No	Punjabi	Featuring Ammy Virk	T-Series
2017	Mann Bharrya	Jaani	No	Punjabi	Featuring Himanshi Khurana	Speed Records
2017	Bewafaai	Jaani	No	Punjabi	Featuring Gauhar Khan	Speed Records
2018	Mastaani	Jaani	No	Punjabi	Featuring Nimrit Kaur Ahluwalia	Speed Records
2018	Hath Chummne (Cover)	Jaani	No	Punjabi	With Jaani	Desi Melodies
2019	Filhaal	Jaani	No	Hindi/Punjabi	Featuring Akshay Kumar & Nupur Sanon	Desi Melodies
2020	Kuch Bhi Ho Jaaye	Jaani	Yes	Hindi/Punjabi	Only lyrical video	Desi Melodies
2020	Koi Faryaad (Unplugged)	Faizz Anwar	No	Hindi	Originally sung by Jagjit Singh	T-Series
2020	Sach Keh Rha Hai (Cover)	Sameer	No	Hindi	Originally sung by KK	Saregama
2020	Besharam Bewaffa	Jaani	No	Hindi/Punjabi	Featuring Divya Khosla Kumar & Gautam Gulati; From album Jaani Ve	T-Series
2021	Mazza	Jaani	No	Hindi	Featuring Gurmeet Chaudhary & Hansika Motwani	Saregama
2021	Baarish Ki Jaaye	Jaani	No	Hindi	Featuring Nawazuddin Siddiqui & Sunanda Sharma	Desi Melodies
2021	Filhaal2 Mohabbat	Jaani	No	Hindi/Punjabi	Featuring Akshay Kumar & Nupur Sanon; Sequel to Filhaal	Desi Melodies
2022	Ik Mil Mainu Apsara	Jaani	Yes	Punjabi	With Asees Kaur; Featuring Sandeepa Dhar; New version of Jaani's Apsara	Desi Melodies
2022	Ishq Nahi Karte	Jaani	No	Hindi	Featuring Emraan Hashmi & Sahher Bamba	DRJ Records
2022	Duniya	Jaani	Yes	Hindi	Featuring Sunny Singh & Saiee Manjrekar	YRF
2023	Achha Sila Diya	Jaani	No	Hindi	Featuring Rajkumar Rao & Nora Fatehi	T-Series
2023	Badhte Jana Hai	B Praak	Yes	Hindi		Speed Records
2024	Mukke Paye Si	Sagar	No	Punjabi	Featuring Neha Sharma & Sunny Kaushal	Desi Melodies
2025	Mahakaal	Jaani	No	Hindi		Kripa Record
2025	Mahakaal	Kalyan Chakravarthy Tripuraneni	No	Telugu		Kripa Record
2025	Barsana Mila Hai	Shri Haridas Ji	No	Hindi	Co-singer Afsana Khan	Kripa Record
2026	Braj Ras	Jaani & Traditional	Yes	Hindi	Co-music Mir Desai	Kripa Record
2026	Mero Mann	Shri Vinod Baba Ji Maharaj	No	Hindi		Kripa Record

=== As a music director ===
Year	Album	Singer(s)	Lyricist	Composer	Language	Record label
2012	Dhokha	Gora Chakwala		Yes		Goyal Music
2013	Soch	Harrdy Sandhu	Jaani	Yes	Punjabi	T-Series
2014	Joker	Harrdy Sandhu	Jaani	Yes	Punjabi	T-Series
2014	Saree Wali Girl	Girik Aman	Jaani	Yes	Punjabi	Sony Music India
2014	Ik Saal	Jassi Gill	Jaani	Yes	Punjabi	Sony Music India
2015	Taara	Ammy Virk	Jaani	Yes	Punjabi	Sony Music India
2015	Go Baby Go	Ronnie	Jaani	Yes	Punjabi	Panj-aab Records
2015	Supna	Amrinder Gill	Jaani	Yes	Punjabi	Rhythm Boyz
2015	Naa Ji Naa	Harrdy Sandhu	Jaani	Yes	Punjabi	Sony Music India
2015	Mere Kol	Prabh Gill	Jaani	Yes	Punjabi	Sony Music India
2015	O Kithe	Kamal Khan	Jaani	Yes	Punjabi	Sony Music India
2015	Yaar Matlabi	Karan Benipal	Jaani	Yes	Punjabi	T-Series
2015	Without You	Harrdy Sandhu, Vaibhav Saxena	Jaani	Yes	Punjabi	T-Series
2015	Paani	Yuvraj Hans	Jaani	Yes	Punjabi	Rhythm Boyz
2016	Hornn Blow	Harrdy Sandhu	Jaani	Yes	Punjabi	T-Series
2016	Surma To Sandals	Ammy Virk	Jaani	Yes	Punjabi	T-Series
2016	Do Din	Manraaj	Jaani	Yes	Punjabi	Sony Music India
2016	Marijuana	Hardik Trehan	Jaani	Yes	Punjabi	Speed Records
2016	Oscar	Gippy Grewal	Jaani	Yes	Punjabi	Tips Official
2016	Ikk Vaari Hor Soch Lae	Harish Verma	Jaani	Yes	Punjabi	Speed Records
2016	Hauli Hauli	BIG Dhillon	Jaani	Yes	Punjabi	Times Music
2016	Suicide	Sukh E Muzical Doctorz	Jaani	No	Punjabi	T-Series
2016	Bacha	Prabh Gill	Jaani	Yes	Punjabi	Speed Records
2016	Ghat Boldi	Gippy Grewal	Jaani	No	Punjabi	SagaHits
2016	Subha Subha	Ranvir	Jaani	No	Punjabi	Speed Records
2016	Do You Know	Diljit Dosanjh	Jaani	No	Punjabi	Famous Studios
2017	Backbone	Harrdy Sandhu	Jaani	Yes	Punjabi	Sony Music India
2017	Pucheya Na Karo	Sammy Singh	Jaani	No	Punjabi	Speed Records
2017	Yaar Ve	Harish Verma	Jaani	Yes	Punjabi	Speed Records
2017	Oye Hoye Oye Hoye	Jaz Dhami	Jaani	No	Punjabi	Zee Music Company
2017	Car Nachdi	Gippy Grewal feat Bohemia	Jaani	Yes	Punjabi	T-Series
2017	Qismat	Ammy Virk	Jaani	No	Punjabi	Speed Records
2017	Violin	Arshhh Feat Roach Killa	Jaani	Yes	Punjabi	Speed Records
2017	Jimmy Choo Choo	Guri Feat Ikka	Jaani	No	Punjabi	Geet MP3
2017	Yaar Ni Milyaa	Harrdy Sandhu	Jaani	Yes	Punjabi	Ishtar Punjabi
2017	Guitar Sikhda	Jassi Gill	Jaani	No	Punjabi	Speed Records
2017	Naah	Hardy Sandhu	Jaani	Yes	Punjabi	Sony Music India
2018	Dil Ton Black	Jassi Gill feat Badshah	Jaani	No	Punjabi	T-Series
2018	Hath Chumme	Ammy Virk	Jaani	No	Punjabi	Desi Melodies
2018	Sooraj	Gippy Grewal	Jaani	No	Punjabi	T-Series
2018	Fitoor	B Jay Randhawa	Jaani	No	Punjabi	TOB Gang
2018	Mai Terra Akshay	Babbal Rai ft Bohemia	Jaani	No	Punjabi	Humble Music
2018	Kya Baat Ay	Hardy Sandhu	Jaani	No	Punjabi	Sony Music India
2018	Teri Khamiyan	Akhil	Jaani	No	Hindi/Punjabi	Speed Records
2018	Pinjraa	Gurnazar Chattha	Jaani	No	Punjabi	Speed Records
2018	I Need Yaa	Sukh-E Muzical Doctorz	Jaani	Yes	Punjabi	Sony Music India
2019	Ve Pathra	Gursaaz	Jaani	No	Punjabi	T-Series
2019	Gali Da Gunda	Sahiba	Jaani	No	Punjabi	Desi Melodies
2019	Jaani Ve Jaani	Afsana Khan, Jaani	Jaani	Yes	Punjabi	Desi Melodies
2019	Rona Sikhade Ve	Miel	Jaani	No	Punjabi	Single Track Studio
2019	Hawaa	Grann Sidhu	Jaani	No	Punjabi	T-Series
2019	Kalla Changa	Ninja	Jaani	No	Punjabi	Ishtar Punjabi
2019	Dance Like	Harrdy Sandhu	Jaani	No	Punjabi	Sony Music India
2019	Laare	Maninder Buttar	Jaani	Yes	Punjabi	Ishtar Punjabi
2020	Bandeya	Gurjot Singh Kaler	Jaani	No	Punjabi	Speed Records
2021	Koi Hor	Dilnoor, Afsana Khan	Gurnazar Chatha	No	Punjabi	Pellet Drum Productions
2021	Goriyaan Goriyaan	Romanna	Jaani	No	Punjabi	Desi Melidies
2021	Doob Gaye	Guru Randhawa	Jaani	No	Hindi	T-Series
2021	Patthar Wargi	Ranvir	Jaani	No	Hindi	T-Series
2021	Ilzaam	Manraj	Romanna	No	Punjabi	Pellet Drums Production
2021	Bijlee Bijlee	Harrdy Sandhu	Jaani	No	Punjabi	Desi Melodies
2022	Kudiyan Lahore Diyan	Harrdy Sandhu	Jaani	Yes	Punjabi	Desi Melodies
2022	More Saiyaan Ji	Maninder Buttar	Jaani	Yes	Punjabi	Ishtar Punjabi
2023	Ittar	Jasmine Sandlas	Jaani	Yes	Punjabi	Desi Melodies
2023	Ankhaan Meech Ke	Akhil Sachdeva	Jaani	Yes	Punjabi	Hitz Music
2023	Chandni	Sachet–Parampara	Jaani	No	Punjabi	T-Series
2024	Theek Hai Na Tu?	Sarang Sikander	Jaani	Yes	Punjabi	Humble Music
2024	Saiyaan Ki Bandook	Sonu Thukral, Renuka Panwar	Jaani	No	Punjabi	Desi Melodies
2025	Aayiye Ram Ji	Shreya Ghoshal	Jaani	No	Hindi	Kripa Record
2025	Radha Gori Gori	Indresh Upadhyay	Traditional	No	Hindi	Kripa Record
2025	Mera Yaar	Dilnoor	M Ravi	No	Hindi	Universal Music India
2025	Pyaro Vrindavan	Indresh Upadhyay		No	Hindi	Kripa Record
2025	Radhika Dulari	Indresh Upadhyay	Ravindra Jain	No	Hindi	Kripa Record

=== As a singer only ===
Year	Song	Music director	Lyricist	Co-singer	Language	Record label
2019	Nain Tere	Sukh-E	Jaani		Punjabi	Speed Records
2020	Kyon	Payal Dev	Kunaal Vermaa	Payal Dev	Hindi	Apni Dhunn
2020	Dil Tod Ke	Rochak Kohli	Manoj Muntashir		Hindi	T-Series
2021	Muaka Hai	Rochak Kohli	Manoj Muntashir		Hindi	T-Series
2022	Dhoke Pyaar Ke	Rochak Kohli	Rashmi Virag		Hindi	T-Series
2022	Roohedaariyaan	Akashdeep Sengupta	Shloke Lal	Neeti Mohan	Punjabi	Desi Melodies
2022	Kya Hota	Bunny	Jaani	Romana	Punjabi	Desi Melodies
2023	Tujhe Yaad Naa Meri Aayi 2	Jatin–Lalit	Jaani		Hindi	Sony Music India
2025	Lagey Rabb Warga	Mukku, Suyash, Danny	Mukku		Punjabi	Desi Melodies
2025	Dhan Gur Tegh Bahadur	Ani	Damanpreet Singh Kotla	Nirvair Khalsa Jatha Uk	Punjabi	Kripa Record
2026	Jugni	Avvy Sra, MNLTX	FXRZII	Sonu Thukral	Punjabi	ST Music
2026	Gaadi Jeevan Ki	Lakshay	Dhrruv Yogi, Paradox	Paradox	Haryanvi	Kripa Record
2026	Hum Katha Sunate Ram Sakal Gun Dham Ki (Recreated Version)	Siddharth Amit Bhavsar & Mir Desai	Ravindra Jain	Kavita Krishnamurthy, Indresh Upadhyay, Aditya Gadhvi, Prateeksha Srivastava	Hindi	Tilak Bhakti Path

== Soundtrack albums ==
=== As a music director ===
Year	Movie /Album	Song	Singer(s)	Composer	Lyricist	Language	Record label
2014	Shayar	Shayar (Intro)	Jaani	Yes	Jaani	Punjabi	Sony Music India
2014	Shayar	Ikk Saal	Jassie Gill	Yes	Jaani	Punjabi	Sony Music India
2015	Shayar	Taara	Ammy Virk	Yes	Jaani	Punjabi	Sony Music India
2015	Shayar	Na Ji Na	Harrdy Sandhu	Yes	Jaani	Punjabi	Sony Music India
2015	Shayar	Saanwariya	Amrinder	Yes	Jaani	Punjabi	Sony Music India
2015	Shayar	Supna	G Preet	Yes	Jaani	Punjabi	Sony Music India
2015	Shayar	Naina Nu	Armaan Kang	Yes	Jaani	Punjabi	Sony Music India
2015	Shayar	Mai Kehnda Nahi	Shivam	Yes	Jaani	Punjabi	Sony Music India
2015	Shayar	Do Din	Manraaj	Yes	Jaani	Punjabi	Sony Music India
2016	Kaptaan	Oscar	Gippy Grewal, Badshah	Yes	Jaani	Punjabi	Tips Music
2017	Sargi	Fer Ohi Hoyea	Jassie Gill	No	Jaani	Punjabi	Speed Records
2018	Qismat	Kaun Hoyega	B Praak, Divya Bhatt	No	Jaani	Punjabi	Speed Records
2018	Qismat	Awaaz	Kamal Khan	No	Jaani	Punjabi	Speed Records
2018	Qismat	Fakira	Gurnam Bhullar	No	Jaani	Punjabi	Speed Records
2018	Qismat	Dholna	B Praak	No	Jaani	Punjabi	Speed Records
2019	High End Yaariyan	Rabba Ve	B Praak	No	Jaani	Punjabi	Speed Records
2019	Jaani Ve	Pachtaoge	Arijit Singh, Atif Aslam (replaced)	No	Jaani	Punjabi / Hindi	T-Series
2019	Jaani Ve	Jinke Liye	Neha Kakkar	No	Jaani	Punjabi / Hindi	T-Series
2019	Jaani Ve	Besharam Bewaffa	B Praak	No	Jaani	Punjabi / Hindi	T-Series
2019	Bala	Naah Goriye	Hardy Sandhu, Swasti Mehul	No	Jaani	Hindi	Sony Music India
2020	Sufna	Qabool A	Hashmat Sultana	No	Jaani	Punjabi	Speed Records
2020	Sufna	Jaan Deyan Ge	Ammy Virk	No	Jaani	Punjabi	Speed Records
2020	Sufna	Ammi	Kamal Khan	No	Jaani	Punjabi	Speed Records
2020	Sufna	Channa Ve	B Praak	No	Jaani	Punjabi	Speed Records
2020	Sufna	Jannat	B Praak	No	Jaani	Punjabi	Speed Records
2020	Sufna	Shukriya	B Praak	No	Jaani	Punjabi	Speed Records
2020	Ik Sandhu Hunda Si	Galib	B Praak	No	Jaani	Punjabi	Humble Music
2021	Shershaah	Mann Bharya 2.0	B Praak	Yes	Jaani	Hindi	Sony Music India
2021	Ucha Pind	Maula	B Praak	No	Jaani	Punjabi	ND Music
2021	Ucha Pind	Channa Ve	Kamal Khan	No	Jaani	Punjabi	ND Music
2021	Qismat 2	Qismat 2 – Title Track	B Praak	No	Jaani	Punjabi	Tips Punjabi
2021	Qismat 2	Janam	Romy	Yes	Jaani	Punjabi	Tips Punjabi
2021	Qismat 2	Teri Akheeyan	Ammy Virk, Afsana Khan	No	Jaani	Punjabi	Tips Punjabi
2021	Qismat 2	Kis Morh Te	B Praak, Jyoti Nooran	No	Jaani	Punjabi	Tips Punjabi
2021	Qismat 2	Mere Yaara Ve	B Praak	No	Jaani	Punjabi	Tips Punjabi
2021	Qismat 2	Paagla	B Praak, Asees Kaur	Yes	Jaani	Punjabi	Tips Punjabi
2022	Bachchan Pandey	Meri Jaan Meri Jaan	B Praak	Yes	Jaani	Hindi	T-Series
2022	Lekh	Udd Gaya	B Praak	No	Jaani	Punjabi	Ishtar Punjabi
2022	Lekh	Bewafai Kar Gaya	B Praak	Yes	Jaani	Punjabi	Ishtar Punjabi
2022	Lekh	Mere Yaar	Gurnam Bhullar	No	Jaani	Punjabi	Ishtar Punjabi
2022	Lekh	Beliya	Gurnam Bhullar	No	Jaani	Punjabi	Ishtar Punjabi
2022	Lekh	Zarori Nai	Afsana Khan	Yes	Jaani	Punjabi	Ishtar Punjabi
2022	Moh	Sab Kuch	B Praak	No	Jaani	Punjabi	Tips Punjabi
2022	Moh	Salooq	B Praak	No	Jaani	Punjabi	Tips Punjabi
2022	Moh	Meri Zuban	Kamal Khan	No	Jaani	Punjabi	Tips Punjabi
2022	Moh	Mere Kol	Afsana Khan	No	Jaani	Punjabi	Tips Punjabi
2022	Moh	Aukaad	Jaani	No	Jaani	Punjabi	Tips Punjabi
2022	Honeymoon	Jhaanjar	B Praak	No	Jaani	Punjabi	T-Series
2022	Honeymoon	Aa Chaliye	B Praak	No	Jaani	Punjabi	T-Series
2022	Honeymoon	Hypnotize	Gippy Grewal, Shipra Goyal	No	Jaani	Punjabi	T-Series
2022	Honeymoon	Naa Main Bewafa	Tanvir Hussain	No	Jaani	Punjabi	T-Series
2022	Honeymoon	Honeymoon Title Track	Gippy Grewal, Simar Kaur	No	Jaani	Punjabi	T-Series
2022	Govinda Naam Mera	Kya Baat Ay 2.0	Hardy SandhuNikhita Gandhi	Yes	Jaani	Hindi	Sony Music India
2022	Govinda Naam Mera	Kya Baat Ay 2.0 (Remix)	Hardy SandhuNikhita Gandhi	Yes	Jaani	Hindi	Sony Music India
2023	Zohrajabeen	Kya Loge Tum	B Praak	No	Jaani	Punjabi/Hindi	Desi Melodies
2023	Zohrajabeen	Yaar Ka Sataya Hua Hai	B Praak	No	Jaani	Punjabi/Hindi	Desi Melodies
2023	Zohrajabeen	Allah De Bandeya	B Praak	No	Jaani	Punjabi/Hindi	Desi Melodies
2023	Zohrajabeen	Zohrajabeen	B Praak	Yes	Jaani	Punjabi/Hindi	Desi Melodies
2023	Zohrajabeen	Mal Mal	B Praak	No	Jaani	Punjabi/Hindi	Desi Melodies
2023	Zohrajabeen	Aate Rehte Haim	B Praak	No	Jaani	Punjabi/Hindi	Desi Melodies
2023	Zohrajabeen	Farehaa	B Praak	No	Jaani	Punjabi/Hindi	Desi Melodies
2023	Zohrajabeen	Hota Hai Ji Hota Hai	B Praak	No	Jaani	Punjabi/Hindi	Desi Melodies
2023	Zohrajabeen	Main Aaunga	B Praak	Yes	Jaani	Punjabi/Hindi	Desi Melodies
2023	Zohrajabeen	Tu Tu Tu	B Praak	No	Jaani	Punjabi/Hindi	Desi Melodies
2026	Ishqnama	Narak	B Praak, Jyotica Tangri	Yes	Jaani	Punjabi	Tips Punjabi
2026	Ishqnama	Tu Ladvayengi	G Khan, Jasmeen Akhtar	No	Jaani	Punjabi	Tips Punjabi
2026	Ishqnama	Narak - Reprise Version	Shehnaaz Gill, Bunny	Yes	Jaani	Punjabi	Tips Punjabi
2026	Ishqnama	Ki Keya	B Praak	No	Jaani	Punjabi	Tips Punjabi
2026	Ishqnama	Aaja Yaara	B Praak	No	Jaani	Punjabi	Tips Punjabi
2026	Ishqnama	Duniya	B Praak	No	Jaani	Punjabi	Tips Punjabi
2026	Ishqnama	Mirzya	Afsana Khan	Yes	Jaani	Punjabi	Tips Punjabi
2026	Ishqnama	Kabutar Chine	Bhupinder Babbal	No	Jaani	Punjabi	Tips Punjabi

=== As a playback singer ===
Year	Movie /Album	Song	Music	Lyricist	Co-singer(s)	Language	Record label
2018	Namaste England	Bhare Bazaar	Badshah, Rishi Rich	Master Rakesh, Badshah	Vishal Dadlani, Payal Dev, Badshah	Hindi	Sony Music India
2019	Kesari	Teri Mitti	Arko	Manoj Muntashir		Hindi	Zee Music Company
2019	Kesari	Teri Mitti (Tribute Version)	Arko	Manoj Muntashir		Hindi	Zee Music Company
2019	Blank	Ali Ali	Arko	Arko		Hindi	Zee Music Company
2019	Batla House	O Saki Saki	Tanishk Bagchi		Neha Kakkar, Tulsi Kumar	Hindi	T-Series
2019	Hotel Mumbai	Bharat Salaam	Mithoon		Sunidhi Chauhan	Hindi	Zee Music Company
2019	Daaka	Koi Aaye Na Rabba	Rochak Kohli	Kumaar		Punjabi	T-Series
2019	Pati Patni Aur Woh	Dilbara (Version 2)	Sachet- Parampara	Navi Ferozpurwala		Hindi	T-Series
2019	Good Newwz	Maana Dil	Tanishk Bagchi	Rashmi Virag		Hindi	Zee Music Company
2019	Bala	Naah Goriye	B Praak	Jaani	Hardy Sandhu, Swasti Mehul	Hindi	Sony Music India
2020	Durgamati	Baras Baras	Tanishk Bagchi		Altmish Fridi	Hindi	T-Series
2021	Koi Jaane Na	Jaane De	Rochak Kohli	Manoj Muntashir		Hindi	T-Series
2021	Shershaah	Ranjha	Jasleen Royal	Anvita Dutt	Jasleen Royal, Romy	Hindi	Sony Music India
2021	Shershaah	Mann Bharya 2.0	B Praak	Jaani		Hindi	Sony Music India
2021	Shershaah	Mann Bharya 2.0 (Film Version)	B Praak	Jaani	Payal Dev	Hindi	Sony Music India
2021	Satyameva Jayate 2	Janna Ganna Manna	Arko	Manoj Muntashir	Arko	Hindi	T-Series
2021	Tadap	Hoye Ishq Na	Pritam	Irshad Kamil	Dino James	Hindi	T-Series
2022	Bachchhan Paandey	Meri Jaan Meri Jaan	B Praak	Jaani		Hindi	T-Series
2022	Bachchhan Paandey	Saare Bolo Bewafa	Jaani	Jaani		Hindi	T-Series
2022	Oye Makhna	Chum Chum Rakheya	Gaurav Dev, Kartik Dev	Kirat Gill		Punjabi	Saregama
2022	Govinda Naam Mera	Kya Baat Ay 2.0	B Praak, Tanishk Bagchi	Jaani	Hardy Sandhu, Nikhita Gandhi	Hindi	Sony Music India
2022	Govinda Naam Mera	Kya Baat Ay 2.0 (Remix)	B Praak, Tanishk Bagchi, Kimera	Jaani	Hardy Sandhu, Nikhita Gandhi	Hindi	Sony Music India
2023	Bholaa	Aadha Main Aadhi Vo	Ravi Basrur	Irshad Kamil		Hindi	T-Series
2023	Carry On Jatta 3	Farishtey	Jaani			Punjabi	East Sunshine Productions
2023	Mission Raniganj	Jeetenge	Arko	Kumar Vishwas	Arko	Hindi	Jjust Music
2023	Animal	Saari Duniya Jalaa Denge	Jaani			Hindi	T-Series
2024	Fighter	Heer Aasmani	Vishal-Shekhar	Kumaar	Vishal Dadlani, Shekhar Ravjiani	Hindi	T-Series
2024	Jatt Nuu Chudail Takri	Parindey	Avvy Sra	Harmanjeet		Punjabi	Speed Records
2024	Jatt Nuu Chudail Takri	Rabba Mereya	Avvy Sra	Jaani		Punjabi	Speed Records
2024	Yodha	Tiranga	Tanishk Bagchi	Manoj Muntashir		Hindi	T-Series
2024	Yodha	Qismat Badal Di	B Praak, Aditya Dev	Jaani	Ammy Virk	Hindi	T-Series
2024	Crew	Darbadar	Akshay & IP	IP Singh	Asses Kaur	Hindi	TIps Music
2024	Samandar	Tu Maro Dariyo	Kedar & Bhargav	Bhargav Purohit		Gujarati	KP & UD Motion Pictures
2024	Jatt & Juliet 3	Ki Hoya	Bunny	Jaani	Afsana Khan	Punjabi	Speed Records
2024	Gandhi 3 Yarran Da Yaar	Chann	Avvy Sra	Harmanjeet		Punjabi	Times Music
2024	The Buckingham Murders	Yaad Reh Jaati Hai	Payal Dev	Kunaal Vermaa		Hindi	Tips Music
2024	Bandaa Singh Chaudhary	Shabash Jawaana	Rahul Jain	Kunaal Vermaa		Hindi	Zee Music Company
2024	The Miranda Brothers	Pyaar Bhi Jhoota	Tanishk Bagchi, R. D. Burman	Tanishk Bagchi, Majrooh Sultanpuri	Yo Yo Honey Singh	Hindi	T-Series
2024	Kanguva	Fire Song	Devi Sri Prasad	Raqueeb Alam	Pavithra Chari	Hindi	Saregama
2025	Fateh	Rona Taqdeer	Shabbir Ahmed	Shabbir Ahmed, Ajay Pal Sharma	Saloni Thakkar	Hindi	Zee Music Company
2025	Sky Force	Maaye	Tanishk Bagchi	Manoj Muntashir		Hindi	Saregama
2025	Badnaam	Bijliaan	Avvy Sra	Harmanjeet		Punjabi	Flow Fire
2025	Pind Peya Saara Jombieland Baneya	Duniya	Avvy Sra	Khara		Punjabi	Tips Punjabi
2025	Metro... In Dino	Yaad (Encore)	Pritam	Momin Khan Momin, Sandeep Shrivastava	Shilpa Rao	Hindi	T-Series
2025	Sarzameen	Ve Mahiya	Vishal Khurana K	Kausar Munir		Hindi	Saregama
2025	Tehran	Ishq Bukhaar	Tanishk Bagchi	Irshad Kamil	Shreya Ghoshal	Hindi	Zee Music Company
2025	Baaghi 4	Marjaana	Siddhaant Miishhraa	Sameer Anjaan	Siddhaant Miishhraa	Hindi	T-Series
2025	Mehar	Yaari	Jay Katyal	Sumny Thulewal	Jay Katyal	Punjabi	Dreams Music
2025	The Ba***ds of Bollywood	"Sajna Tu Beiman"	Shashwat Sachdev		Shilpa Rao, Shashwat Sachdev	Hindi	T-Series
2025	Ajey: The Untold Story of a Yogi	Galliyaan Chhod Chale	Meet Bros	Jashar Singh, Nandini Singh		Hindi	Samrat Cinematics
2025	Ek Deewane Ki Deewaniyat	Hum Bas Tere Hain	Rahul Mishra	Prince Dubey		Hindi	Play DMF
2025	Ikk Kudi	Ishq Diyan Doraan	MixSingh	Vicky Sandhu		Punjabi	Speed Records
2025	Jaani Aaya Hai	Dil Kaat Ke	Bunny	Jaani		Hindi	Desi Melodies
2026	Border 2	Himdusan Meri Jaan	Anu Malik, Mithoon	Javed Akhtar, Manoj Muntashir	Mohit Chauhan	Hindi	T-Series
2026	Border 2	Border	Gurmoh, Traditional	Anurag Singh		Punjabi	T-Series
2026	Ishqa'n De Lekhe	Mohabbat	Avvy Sra	Amrit Dhillon		Punjabi	Speed Records
2026	Shera	Kaash Tu Mera Na Hunda	Gaurav Dev & Kartik Dev	Eemaan	Jyoti Nooran	Punjabi	Speed Records
2026	Carry On Jatta 4	Dil Diyan Gallan	Jatinder Shah	Happy Raikoti		Punjabi	Moviebox Record Label
2026	Singh Vs Kaur 2	Dil Udeya	Kulshan Sandhu	Happy Raikoti	Sultana Khan	Punjabi	Speed Records
2026	Daayra	Sach Ka Daayra	Amit Trivedi	Gulzar		Hindi	Times Music
2026	Prem Keetanu	Iahq Ka Ghulaam	The Rish	Kunaal Vermaa		Hindi	Zee Music Company
2026	King of Salangpur	Jai Hanuman	Prashant Satose	Niraj Ker		Gujarati	Vamika Productions

== Awards and nominations ==
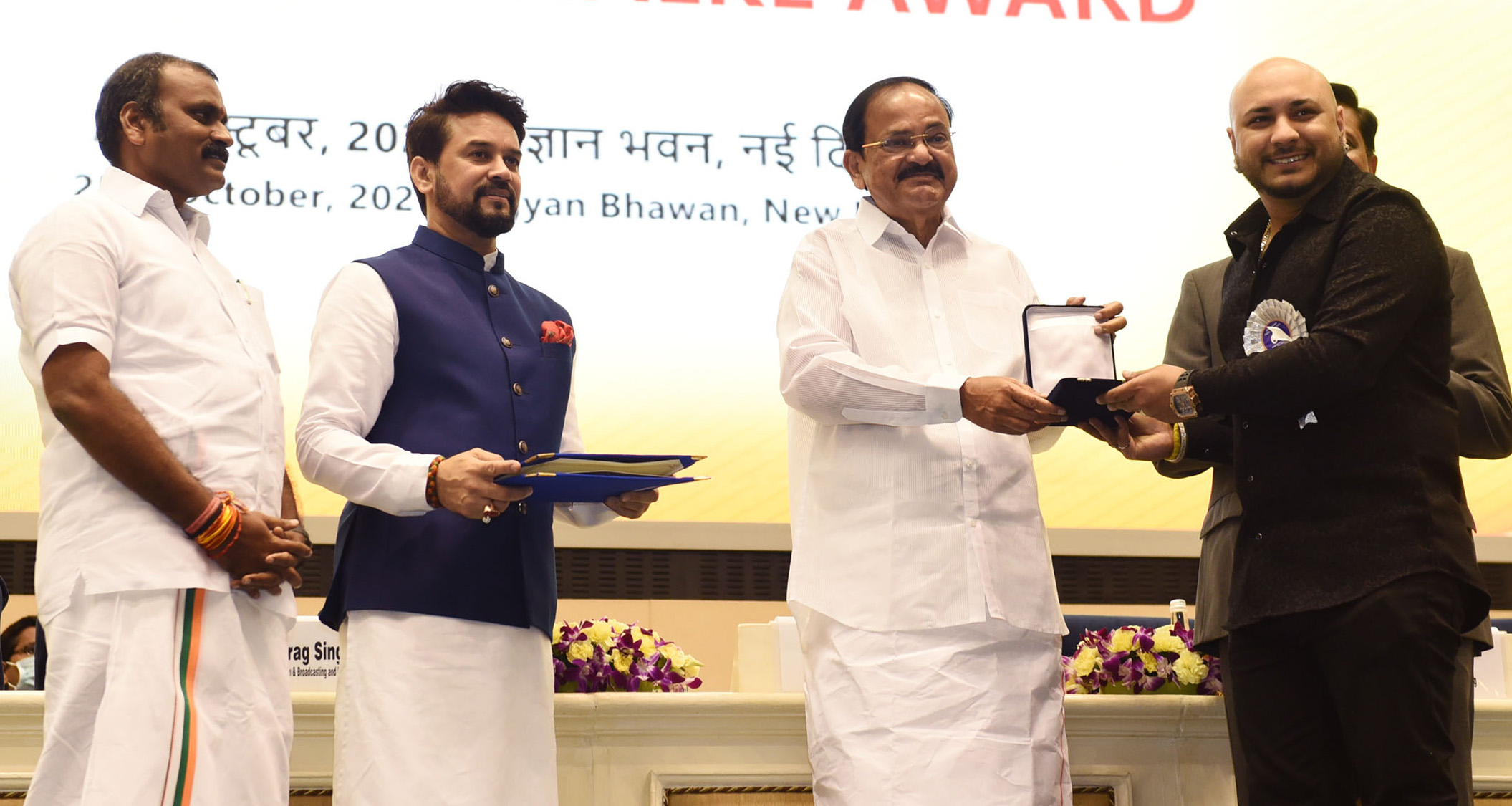
B Praak being felicitated by Vice President Naidu at 66th National Film Awards

Year	Award	Category	Film	Song(s)	Result	Ref(s)
2020	Filmfare Awards	Best Male Playback Singer	Kesari	Teri Mitti	Nominated	
2022	Filmfare Awards	Best Male Playback Singer	Shershaah	Mann Bharrya	Won	
2022	Filmfare Awards	Best Music Director	Shershaah	—N/a	Won	
2021	International Indian Film Academy Awards	Best Male Playback Singer	Kesari	Teri Mitti	Nominated	
2022	International Indian Film Academy Awards	Best Male Playback Singer	Shershaah	Mann Bharrya	Nominated	
2022	International Indian Film Academy Awards	Best Lyricist	Shershaah	Mann Bharrya	Nominated	
2022	International Indian Film Academy Awards	Best Music Director	Shershaah	—N/a	Won	
2021	National Film Awards	Best Male Playback Singer	Kesari	Teri Mitti	Won	
