= Filhaal 2: Mohabbat =

2021 single by B Praak and Jaani

Single by B Praak
- Language: Punjabi, Hindi
- Released: 6 July 2021
- Genre: Indian pop
- Length: 5:25
- Label: Desi Melodies
- Songwriter: Jaani

Music video
- "Filhaal2 Mohabbat" on YouTube

"Filhaal 2: Mohabbat" (transl. Momentary 2: Love) is a 2021 Indian album song written by Jaani and sung by B Praak. The song serves as a sequel to Praak's 2019 hit single "Filhall". The video of the song is directed by Arvindr Khaira while the music is produced by B Praak. This song features Akshay Kumar and Nupur Sanon in the music video.

== Cast ==
- Akshay Kumar as Dr Kabir Malhotra
- Nupur Sanon as Meher Grewal
- Ammy Virk as Meher's husband

== Music video ==
The music video titled "Filhaal 2: Mohabbat" was released by Desi Melodies on YouTube. It marks the second collaboration between Kumar, Sanon, Praak and Jaani after "Filhall" (2019).

The song depicts the feelings of Kabir and the old loving time they spend together. Parts of the song were shot on the flyover of the underconstruction Dwarka Expressway.

== Reception ==
It received more than 50 million views on YouTube within 24 hours of the official release.

The official video reached 100 million+ views on 9 July 2021 within just 3 days of release.

== Song credits ==
- Song : Filhaal2 Mohabbat
- Singer : B Praak
- Starring : Akshay Kumar, Nupur Sanon, Ammy Virk
- Lyricist and Composer : Jaani
- Music Director : B Praak
- Music Programmers : Gaurav Dev & Kartik Dev
- Mixing and Mastering : Gurjinder Guri & Akaash Bambar
- Video Director : Arvindr Khaira
- DOP : Anurag Solanki, Al Ameel
- Creative Director / Steadicam : Amaninder Singh
- Editor : Adele Periera
- Assistant Director : Satnam, Sukhman Sukhu, Jais Sivia, Gaurav
- Producers : Jaani, Arvindr Khaira and Akshay Kumar
- Executive Producer : Avadh Nagpal
- Projection : Dilraj Nandha
- Online Promotion: Net Media
- Label : Desi Melodies
- Supporting Production : Cape of Good Films
- Special Thanks : Azeem Dayani
