= Filhall =

2019 single by B Praak and Jaani

Single by B Praak and Jaani
- Language: Punjabi, Hindi
- Released: 9 November 2019
- Genre: Indian pop
- Length: 5:30
- Label: Desi Melodies
- Songwriter: Jaani

Music video
- "Filhall" on YouTube

"Filhall" (transl. Momentary) is a 2019 Indian album song written by Jaani and sung by B Praak. The video of the song is directed by Arvindr Khaira and the music is produced by B Praak. This song features Akshay Kumar and Nupur Sanon.

== Cast ==
- Akshay Kumar as Dr Kabir Malhotra
- Nupur Sanon as Meher Grewal
- Asmita Sood as Kabir's wife
- Ammy Virk as Meher's husband

== Music video ==
The music video titled "Filhall" was released by Desi Melodies on YouTube. This is the debut music video of Akshay Kumar. It also introduces Nupur Sanon, Kriti Sanon's sister, to the audiences.

The video shows story of two lovers who were separated due to some circumstances coincidentally met after few years. The song basically depicts their feelings at that time that they again want to be together but can't because they both are with someone else now.

== Reception ==
The song was a major hit in 2019. It received more than 13 million views on YouTube within 24 hours of the official release. It became the fastest Indian music video to reach 100, 200, 300, million views on YouTube. As of 20 June 2025, The song has 1.2 billion views on YouTube.

== Sequel ==
On 23 January 2020, Akshay Kumar and the whole team announced the sequel to "Filhall". The shoot of the song was delayed because of the COVID-19 Pandemic in India. On 24 June 2021, Akshay Kumar, B Praak, Jaani and their team shared the official poster of the song, "Filhaal 2: Mohabbat", stating that the teaser will be released on 30 June 2021. The song was released on 6 July 2021.

== Charts ==
Chart (2019–20)	Peak position	References
UK Asian | Official Charts Company	2	
India | Apple Music	1	
