= List of Punjabi films of 2019 =

This is a list of Punjabi films of 2019.

== Box office ==
Rank	Movie	Production House / Studio	Worldwide Gross (Original)	Source
1	Shadaa	A & A Advisors	₹53.10 crore (US$5.6 million)	
2	Ardaas Karaan	Humble Motion Pictures	₹31.82 crore (US$3.4 million)	
3	Chal Mera Putt	Rhythm Boyz Entertainment	₹31.29 crore (US$3.3 million)	
4	Muklawa	White Hill Studios	₹25.52 crore (US$2.7 million)	
5	Manje Bistre 2	Humble Motion Pictures	₹19.25 crore (US$2.0 million)	
6	Kala Shah Kala	Naughty Men Productions	₹19 crore (US$2.0 million)	
7	Nikka Zaildar 3	Patiala Motion Pictures	₹17.95 crore (US$1.9 million)	
8	Guddiyan Patole	Villagers Film Studio	₹17 crore (US$1.8 million)	
9	Rabb Da Radio 2	Vehli Janta Films	₹14 crore (US$1.5 million)	
10	Uda Aida	Vehli Janta Films	₹13 crore (US$1.4 million)	

== January - December ==
Opening		Title	Director	Cast	Producer	Ref
J A N	4	Ishqaa	Nav Bajwa	Nav Bajwa, Payal Rajput, Karamjit Anmol	Nav Bajwa	
J A N	11	Do Dooni Panj	Harry Bhatti	Amrit Maan, Isha Rikhi, Karamjit Anmol	Badshah	
J A N	18	Kaka Ji	Mandeep Benipal	Dev Kharoud, Jagjeet Sandhu	Dreamreality Movies	
F E B	1	Kaake Da Viyah	Raj Yuvraj Bains	Jordan Sandhu, Prabh Grewal	Bebe Inc.	
F E B	1	Uda Aida	Ksshitij Chaudhary	Tarsem Jassar, Neeru Bajwa, Karamjit Anmol	Vehli Janta Films	
F E B	14	Kala Shah Kala	Amarjit Singh	Binnu Dhillon, Sargun Mehta, Jordan Sandhu, Karamjit Anmol	Naughty Men Productions	
F E B	22	High End Yaariyaan	Pankaj Batra	Jassi Gill, Ranjit Bawa, Ninja	Pitaara Talkies	
M A R	8	Guddiyan Patole	Vijay Kumar Arora	Gurnam Bhullar, Sonam Bajwa	Villagers Film Studio	
M A R	15	Band Vaaje	Ravi Verma	Binnu Dhillon, Mandy Takhar, Gurpreet Ghuggi, Jaswinder Bhalla	Shah and Shah	
M A R	29	Rabb Da Radio 2	Sharan Art	Tarsem Jassar, Simi Chahal	Vehli Janta Films	
A P R	5	Yaara Ve	Rakesh Mehta	Gagan Kokri, Yuvraj Hans	Gordon Bridge, Freshly Ground Ent.	
A P R	12	Manje Bistre 2	Baljit Singh Deo	Gippy Grewal, Simi Chahal, Gurpreet Ghuggi, Rana Ranbir, Karamjit Anmol	Humble Motion Pictures	
A P R	26	Nadhoo Khan	Imran Sheikh	Harish Verma, Wamiqa Gabbi	Loud Roar Films, Music Tym Production	
M A Y	3	Dil Diyan Gallan	Uday Pratap Singh	Parmish Verma, Wamiqa Gabbi	Pitaara Talkies	
M A Y	3	Blackia	Sukhminder Dhanjal	Dev Kharoud	Ohri Productions Pvt Ltd	
M A Y	24	Muklawa	Simerjit Singh	Ammy Virk, Sonam Bajwa	White Hill Studios	
M A Y	24	Chandigarh Amritsar Chandigarh	Karan Guliani	Gippy Grewal, Sargun Mehta, Rajpal Yadav	Leostride Entertainment	
M A Y	31	Family 420 Once Again	Gurchet Chitrakar	Gurchet Chitrakar, Mark Calaway, Rana Jung Bahadur, Gurpreet Bhangu, Parminder Gill	Pitaara Talkies	
J U N	7	Laiye Je Yaarian	Sukh Sanghera	Amrinder Gill, Harish Verma, Roopi Gill, Rubina Bajwa	Rhythm Boyz Entertainment, Papilio Media	
J U N	14	Jind Jaan	Darshan Bagga	Rajvir Jwanda, Sara Sharma, Jaswinder Bhalla		
J U N	21	Shadaa	Jagdeep Sidhu	Diljit Dosanjh, Neeru Bajwa	A & A Advisors	
J U N	28	Mindo Taseeldarni	Avtar Singh	Kavita Kaushik, Rajvir Jawandha, Karamjit Anmol	Karamajit Anmol Productions	
J U L	5	DSP Dev	Mandeep Benipal	Dev Kharoud, Mehreen Pirzada, Manav Vij	Dreamreality Movies	
J U L	12	Munda Hi Chahida	Santosh Subhash Thite, Deepak Thaper	Harish Verma, Rubina Bajwa	Neeru Bajwa Productions	
J U L	19	Ardaas Karaan	Gippy Grewal	Gippy Grewal, Japji Khaira	Humble Motion Pictures	
J U L	26	Chal Mera Putt	Janjot Singh	Amrinder Gill, Simi Chahal, Iftikhar Thakur	Rhythm Boyz Entertainment	
A U G	2	Sikander 2	Manav Shah	Guri, Kartar Cheema	GK Studios	
A U G	9	Singham	Navaniat Singh	Parmish Verma, Sonam Bajwa	Ajay Devgn FFilms, Panorama Studios, T-Series	
A U G	15	Mitti Virasat Babbaran Di	Hariday Sheetty	Jagjeet Sandhu, Japji Khaira, Nishawn Bhullar	H.M. Creations	
A U G	23	Naukar Vahuti Da	Smeep Kang	Binnu Dhillon, Kulraj Randhawa, Gurpreet Ghuggi, Jaswinder Bhalla	Rangrezaa Films, Omjee Star Studios	
A U G	30	Surkhi Bindi	Jagdeep Sidhu	Gurnam Bhullar, Sargun Mehta	Shri Narotam Ji Films	
S E P	6	Saak	Kamaljit Singh	Jobanpreet Singh, Mandy Takhar	Jatinder Jay Minhas and Rupinder Preet Minhas	
S E P	6	Jaddi Sardar	Manbhavan Singh	Sippy Gill, Dilpreet Dhillon, Guggu Gill, Gurpreet Bhangu, Parminder Gill	Baljit Singh Johal	
S E P	13	Teri Meri Jodi	Aditya Sood, Kk Taharpuriya	Sammy Gill, King Chouhan, Rana Jung Bahadur, Arshdeep Purba, Parminder Gill	Karan Arora, Manjit Khaira	
S E P	20	Nikka Zaildar 3	Simerjit Singh	Ammy Virk, Wamiqa Gabbi, Nirmal Rishi, Nisha Bano, Parminder Gill	Karan Arora, Manjit Khaira	
S E P	27	Doorbeen	Ishan Chopra	Ninja, Wamiqa Gabbi, Jass Bajwa	Azaad Parindey Films	
O C T	11	Tara Mira	Rajiev Dhingra	Ranjit Bawa, Nazia Hussan	Guru Randhawa	
O C T	18	Unni Ikki	Livtar Singh, Kaypee Gill	Jagjeet Sandhu, Sawan Rupowali, Karamjit Anmol, Nirmal Rishi	KP Motion Pictures, Fish Eye Group	
O C T	18	Ardab Mutiyaran	Manav Shah	Ninja, Sonam Bajwa, Ajay Sarkaria, Mehreen Pirzada	White Hill Studios	
N O V	1	Daaka	Baljit Singh Deo	Gippy Grewal, Zareen Khan	T-Series	
N O V	8	Nanka Mel	Prince Kanwaljit Singh, Simranjit Singh	Rosshan Prince, Rubina Bajwa	Kar Productions, Mad 4 Music	
N O V	15	Jhalle	Amarjit Singh	Binnu Dhillon, Sargun Mehta	Binnu Dhillon, Sargun Mehta and Munish Walia	
N O V	29	Gidharh Singhi	Vipin Parashar	Jordan Sandhu, Rubina Bajwa	Dreamspark Movies	
D E C	13	Amaanat	Royal Singh	Dheeraj Kumar, Neha Pawar		

== Events ==
- PTC Punjabi Film Awards 2019 on 16 March 2019
