= Surkhi Bindi =

2019 Punjabi language film directed by Jagdeep Sidhu

- First look poster
- Directed by: Jagdeep Sidhu
- Screenplay by: Rupinder Inderjit
- Story by: Rupinder Inderjit
- Produced by: Ankit Vijan; Navdeep Narula; Gurjit Singh; Santosh Subhash Thite
- Starring: Sargun Mehta; Gurnam Bhullar
- Cinematography: Akashdeep Pandey
- Edited by: Manish More
- Music by: Sandeep Saxena
- Production company: Shri Narotam Ji Films
- Distributed by: Zee Studios
- Release date: 30 August 2019
- Running time: 128 minutes
- Country: India
- Language: Punjabi
- Budget: ₹4.50 crores
- Box office: ₹21.70 crores

Surkhi Bindi (Surkhi - lipstick; Bindi - a red dot sticker applied by women) is a 2019 Indian-Punjabi drama film written by Rupinder Inderjit and directed by Jagdeep Sidhu. The film was produced by Shri Narotam Ji Films and bankrolled by Ankit Vijan, Navdeep Narula, Gurjit Singh and Santosh Subhash Thite. It is the story of a village girl's dream to migrate to Canada and how her husband fulfills her dream by giving her wings with his limited resources but a very big heart. It stars Sargun Mehta, Gurnam Bhullar, Rupinder Rupi, Nisha Bano, along with Neeru Bajwa (in a special appearance).

Film production started on 4 April 2019 and was theatrically released on 30 August 2019 to positive reviews with Gurnam Bhullar and Sargun Mehta's chemistry being highly praised by critics and audiences. The film performed well at the box office with a domestic gross of INR 7.20 crores ($1.02 million) .

== Plot ==
Randeep Kaur (aka Rano) works at a beauty parlour, wishing to marry her Prince Charming and move to Canada. But when she grows up she soon realizes that her dreams were dreams only as all her school friends made it big in life except for her. One day as per suggestion from her younger sister, she visits an immigration consultant who advises her to join a two-year course in a Canadian cosmetology college post which she can obtain her permanent residence status. She is supposed to pay Rs. 4 lakhs every semester plus Rs. 5 lakhs upfront as their commission. Rano says she doesn't have any money at which the immigration consultant tells her not to worry as there were several guys here who are willing to shell out that much money to obtain a Canadian permanent residence by marrying her on paper. She is hesitant to do this contract/ paper marriage but the immigration consultant sends a prospective groom to the beauty parlor where she works, without her knowledge and he creates a scene with her and everyone there. She is therefore fired from the job and when she returns to her village, her father gets her married to Sukhwinder Singh (aka Sukha) against her will.

She then moves to her in-law's house where she has to live with Sukha's non-cooperative aunt and abusive brother-in-law. She is very unhappy with Sukha and starts cursing her fate as she is now become a housewife but Sukha then starts changing her mind towards him by telling her not to give up in life and that she should temporarily start her own beauty parlour and move to Canada within six months from the earnings. Sukha's brother-in-law gets jealous and drives them away from the house and they then move to the city where the landlady helps her by set up the beauty parlour in her leased upper floor apartment and also helps her to get new clients by referring her shop customers to the beauty parlour. Sukha personally helps Rano in the beauty parlour by doing all the odd jobs like cleaning, mopping and serving tea to her clients. Soon their world turns around and they start earning money and even the landlady later helps them in their personal life by getting Sukha's cousin brother freed from the jail and then the aunt changes for good and starts living together with Sukha and Rano along with her son.

Sukha and Rano have saved money but still fall Rs. 2 lakhs short to give to the immigration consultant. So they borrow some money from the landlady and collect some more from Sukha's company friends who start a chit fund to help each other. Meanwhile, Sukha's brother-in-law gets to know of the money which Sukha has collected and demands its from him otherwise he threatens to throw Sukha's sister out from his home. Sukha gives in to this threat and therefore gives him the money but still Sukha's sister and her kids leave that house as her husband beat her up and they therefore start living with Sukha and Rano. Now with no money left for Rano to migrate to Canada, the landlady advises her to participate in a bridal make-up artist contest held by real life actress Neeru Bajwa. Rano is looked down by the event manager as she is a simpleton and doesn't know English but still goes on to win the competition through her hard work and supportive husband who keeps encouraging her to never give up.

On the stage when she receives the trophy, she gives a speech that no one in her life ever supported her and everyone including her father crushed her dream but her husband lifted her up and supported her at every step and made her dreams turn into reality and that every girl should get a thoughtful & supportive husband like Sukha. She also conveys that she will now not go to Canada as her Canada is here in India with her husband through the love and happiness that he gives her. She then invites him on stage and everyone applauds them. The film closes by showing them having a new beauty parlour at Sukha's village where she is taking care of her client who is Sukha's classmate. Sukha comes in with tickets to Malaysia and the film ends with the two of them on a flight on their way to visit Malaysia .

== Cast ==
- Gurnam Bhullar as Sukha
- Sargun Mehta as Rano
- Rabab Sidhu as Young Rano
- Nisha Bano
- Rupinder Rupi
- Sukhwinder Raj
- Kaka Kautki
- Neeru Bajwa (Special Appearance)

== Production ==
Surkhi Bindi was announced in March 2018; and was scheduled to be released on 8 March 2019 but was postponed due to Jagdeep Sidhu’s busy schedule as he was working in Guddiyan Patole, Shadaa, and Nikka Zaildar 3. Instead of the film Guddiyan Patole was released on the date which also stars Gurnam Bhullar and is written by Sidhu.

Earlier, the film was supposed to be directed by Vijay Kumar Arora, who has also directed Sidhu’s written Harjeeta and Guddiyan Patole, and star Bhullar and Simi Chahal in lead roles. Later, Arora was replaced by Sidhu while Chahal was replaced by Sargun Mehta. First schedule of principal photography of the film began on 4 April 2019 and was finished on 6 May 2019 while second schedule began in early June 2019.

== Soundtrack ==
Surkhi Bindi

Soundtrack album by V RAKX Music, Kick Masterz and Laddi Gill
- Released: 24 August 2019
- Recorded: 2019
- Genre: Feature film soundtrack
- Language: Punjabi
- Label: Zee Music Company
External audio
- Audio song on YouTube

The soundtrack is composed by V RAKX Music, Kick Masterz and Laddi Gill on lyrics of Vicky Dhaliwal, Gurnam Bhullar, Kuldeep Sandhu and Deep Bhekha. Songs are sung by Gurnam Bhullar.

Track listing
No.	Title	Lyrics	Music	Singer(s)	Length
1.	"Karmawala"	Vicky Dhaliwal	V Rakx Music	Gurnam Bhullar	2:28
2.	"Pariya"	Deep Bhekha	V Rakx Music	Gurnam Bhullar	4:06
3.	"Demanda"	Vicky Dhaliwal	V Rakx Music	Gurnam Bhullar	3:22
4.	"Duniya"	Gurnam Bhullar	kickMasterz	Gurnam Bhullar	3:42
5.	"Surkhi Bindi - Title Track"	Gurnam Bhullar	V RAKX Music	Gurnam Bhullar	2:59
6.	"Ganna Te Gurh"	Gill Raunta	Laddi Gill	Gurnam Bhullar	3:03

== Marketing and release ==
The first look poster of the film was released on 1 August 2019. The official trailer of the film was released by Zee Studios on 9 August 2019. It garnered 5.1 million views since its release on YouTube. It was released on 30 August 2019.

== Reception ==
=== Critical response ===
Gurnaaz Kaur of The Tribune gave three and half out of five stars, felt that the 'right to live their dreams was the core of this beautiful love story.' Gurnaaz praised the performance of Bhullar, and opined that the film was not just a comedy but had a subject which invoked sensibilities subtly. Gurnaaz concluded, "Watch it for the stellar act displayed by Sargun Mehta and Gurnam Bhullar, their exhilarating love story and the happy ending that stays with you even when you step out of the theatre."

=== Box office ===
==== India ====
Movie fetched a slow start on opening day collecting ₹30lacs($41,894) only . Film grew over weekend collecting ₹2.25crores($318,995).Movie collected ₹3.85crores($547,813) in its first full week.Film has grossed at total of ₹7.20crores($1,028,689) till now.

==== Overseas ====
In its opening weekend internationally movie collected $246,371(₹1.73crores). At the second weekend movie collected $518,224(₹3.65). Movie continued its successful run collecting $661,083(₹4.70crores). Movies major markets overseas are Canada [$466,893(₹3.26crores)], United States[$146,894(₹1.04crores)], Australia[A$114,836(₹58lacs)], United Kingdom[£70,086(₹63lacs)]. Movie's gross currently stands at $830,589(₹5.85crores).
