= Ravi Dubey =

Indian actor and producer (born 1983)

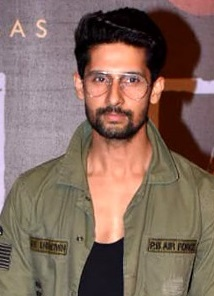
- Dubey at the screening of Article 15 in 2019
- Born: 23 December 1983 (age 42); Gorakhpur, Uttar Pradesh, India
- Education: Rajiv Gandhi Institute of Technology, Mumbai
- Occupations: Actor; model; television presenter; producer
- Years active: 2006–present
- Organization: Dreamiyata Entertainment Pvt Ltd
- Spouse: Sargun Mehta (m. 2013)

Ravi Dubey (born 23 December 1983) is an Indian actor, model, television presenter and producer. He rose to fame by starring in the family dramas, Saas Bina Sasural and Jamai Raja. He also participated in reality shows, Nach Baliye 5 and Fear Factor: Khatron Ke Khiladi 8. He made his feature film debut portraying Lakshmana in Namit Malhotra's Ramayana.

In 2016, Dubey founded the production house Dreamiyata Entertainment Pvt Ltd, producing television series such as Udaariyaan, Ganga Mai Ki Betiyan, Tu Juliet Jatt Di and Punjabi films like Saunkan Saunkane and Saunkan Saunkanay 2.

== Early life ==
Dubey was born in Gorakhpur, Uttar Pradesh and was brought up in Delhi, India. His father, Gyan Prakash Dubey, is a civil engineer, who has worked with management in various real estate organisations in the Delhi/NCR region.

Dubey moved to Mumbai from Delhi to study electronic and telecommunications engineering at the Rajiv Gandhi Institute of Technology. Later, he started working as a model.

== Career ==
=== Television debut (2006–2009) ===
Dubey started his career as a model, then he started his acting career in 2006 with the parallel lead role of Ravi Agarwal in the DD National television show Stree... Teri Kahaani, which was produced by actors, Dilip Kumar and Saira Banu. Later he portrayed the small role of "Veer" in Sahara One's soap opera Doli Saja Ke. Thereafter, he appeared as the male lead in Yahan Ke Hum Sikandar, where he played the role of Ravi.

Dubey has done up to 40 television commercials, including Reliance, TVS Victor, Mrs. Marino, Gee Pee Mobile, Nestle, ICICI, Action Milano Shoes, Fairever, Santro and Water Kingdom.

In December 2008, Dubey replaced Vinay Rohrra for portraying the male lead in Zee television's show Ranbir Rano. After the show ended, Dubey was cast opposite Sargun Mehta in Zee television's soap opera, 12/24 Karol Bagh.

=== Breakthrough (2010–2013) ===
In October 2010, Dubey featured opposite Aishwarya Sakhuja for Sony Entertainment Television's romantic drama, Saas Bina Sasural, in which he portrayed the male lead role of Tej Prakash Chaturvedi. While working in the show, Dubey started his film career with a cameo in Bollywood; he signed for Arun Govil's 2011 Hindi film U R My Jaan.

In January 2012, Dubey participated in Sony Entertainment Television's reality-based comedy series of Comedy Circus titled, Kahani Comedy Circus Ki. Dubey said, "I am super excited as I have always loved the show. So far I have never had the opportunity to try my hands at comedy, which I believe is the toughest of all."

In December 2012, Dubey participated in the fifth season of Star Plus television's celebrity couple dance reality show, Nach Baliye, along with Sargun Mehta. And on 23 March 2013, in the finale episode, he became the first runner-up of the show. Dubey also participated in another of Nach Baliye's celebrity couple dance reality series titled, Nach Baliye Shriman v/s Shrimati in 2013.

In May 2013, Dubey started hosting television shows. He replaced Mohit Malhotra to host Star Plus television's dance reality show, India's Dancing Superstar.

In September 2013, he was approached for the lead role of Rajbir in Rashmi Sharma's show Desh Ki Beti Nandini, but he opted out of the show. Dubey has also appeared along with Shweta Salve at Indian Television Academy's ramp show, Fashion Ka Jalwa.

=== Further success and production (2014–2025) ===
In March 2014, Dubey got the male lead in Zee television's soap opera, Jamai Raja, in which he plays the role of Siddharth "Sid" Khurana opposite Nia Sharma; the show being produced by actor, Akshay Kumar, and co-produced by Ashvini Yardi, under their own production banner, Grazing Goat Pictures.

In December 2014, Dubey hosted an award event of Zee television, Zee Rishtey Awards, along with Shabbir Ahluwalia.

In 2017, Dubey participated in Colors stunt reality show, Khatron Ke Khiladi 8, where he ended up being the 2nd runner-up while Shantanu Maheshwari was the winner and Hina Khan was the 1st runner-up.

In November 2017, Dubey was seen as one of the contestants in the Colors comedy show, Entertainment Ki Raat, along with Dipika Kakar and Asha Negi. He also participated in Star Plus reality show, Lip Sing Battle, along with wife Sargun Mehta, Rithvik Dhanjani and Asha Negi.

In January 2018, Dubey hosted the Colors singing reality show, Rising Star. In June 2018, he also hosted the Star Plus game show, Sabse Smart Kaun. In February 2019, Dubey replaced Aditya Narayan to host the seventh season of Sa Re Ga Ma Pa L'il Champs on Zee TV. He also hosted Zee Rishtey Awards in 2014, 2015, 2017, 2018 and 2019.

He made his debut into the digital space alongside Nia Sharma with the web series, Jamai 2.0, serving as the reboot of his Zee TV show Jamai Raja. The series opened to good reviews. The second season released in February 2021. His next streaming venture was the web series, Matsya Kaand on MX Player, where he played the titular character of Matsya.

In 2016, he founded his own production house Dreamiyata Entertainment Pvt Ltd, with his wife Sargun Mehta and co-produced Punjabi films, including Kala Shah Kala and Jhalle (both 2019), Saunkan Saunkane (2022), and Saunkan Saunkanay 2 (2025). In March 2021, Dreamiyata Entertainment produced its first television series Udaariyaan, which aired on Colors TV. Dubey followed this by producing multiple television shows and streaming ventures across various genres.

=== Venture into Bollywood; Ramayana (2026–present) ===
In October 2024, Dubey was cast as Lakshmana in Ramayana: Part 1 (2026), which also marked his film acting debut. Despite initial skepticism over his television background, Dubey delivered a breakout performance that earned widespread acclaim within an ensemble of established stars. Sunil Lahri, who portrayed Lakshmana in Ramanand Sagar's 1987 series Ramayan, praised Dubey for capturing the character's vital innocence and intensity. Critics further highlighted his comic timing in banter scenes opposite Ranbir Kapoor's Rama. He is set to reprise his role in Ramayana: Part 2, which is scheduled to release on Diwali 2028.

== Personal life ==
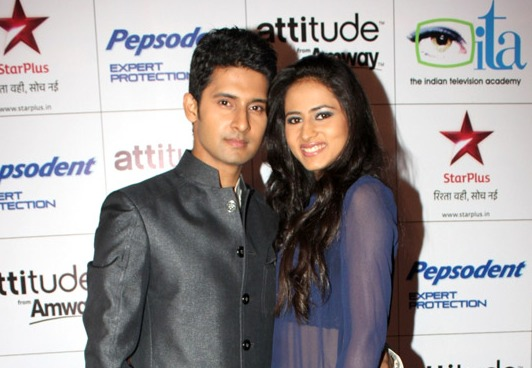
Ravi Dubey with his wife Sargun Mehta at 12th ITA Awards

Dubey married actress Sargun Mehta on 7 December 2013.

Dubey is a follower of Nichiren Buddhism.

He said, "I started following it (Buddhism) when I was going through a very rough patch in my life and I wanted some understanding of the chaos that was going on in one's life. I wanted to align myself and feel better about myself. So, when things went out of control, I started chanting at that time."

== Filmography ==
=== Films ===
==== Producer ====
Year	Title	Ref.
2019	Kala Shah Kala	
2019	Jhalle	
2022	Saunkan Saunkne	
2025	Saunkan Saunkanay 2	

==== Actor ====
Year	Title	Role	Notes	Ref.
2026	Ramayana: Part 1	Lakshmana	Debut in film as an actor	
2027	Ramayana: Part 2 †	Lakshmana	Debut in film as an actor	

=== Television ===
Year	Title	Role	Notes	Ref.
2006–2007	Stree Teri Kahani	Ravi Agarwal		
2007–2008	Yahan Ke Hum Sikandar	Ravi		
2007–2008	Doli Saja Ke	Veer Kapoor		
2008–2009	Ranbir Rano	Ranbir		
2009–2010	12/24 Karol Bagh	Omkar Dagar		
2010–2012	Saas Bina Sasural	Tej Prakash Chaturvedi		
2011	Meri Maa	Himself	Guest appearance	
2011–2013	Parvarrish – Kuchh Khattee Kuchh Meethi	Aadarsh Khanna		
2012	Teri Meri Love Stories	Mukul	Episodic role	
2012–2013	Nach Baliye 5	Contestant	1st runner-up	
2013	Nach Baliye Shriman v/s Shrimati	Contestant		
2013	India's Dancing Superstar	Host		
2013	MasterChef India 3	Himself	Guest appearance	
2013	Nach Baliye 6	Himself	Guest appearance	
2013	Boogie Woogie Kids Championship	Himself	Guest appearance	
2014	Comedy Nights with Kapil	Himself	Guest appearance	
2014–2017	Jamai Raja	Siddharth Khurana/Karanvir Khurana		
2014; 2015	Qubool Hai	Siddharth Khurana	Guest appearance	
2015	Kumkum Bhagya	Siddharth Khurana	Guest appearance	
2015–2016	India's Best Dramebaaz	Host		
2016	Tashan-e-Ishq	Siddharth Khurana	Guest appearance	
2017	Bigg Boss 10	Himself	Guest appearance	
2017	Fear Factor: Khatron Ke Khiladi 8	Contestant	2nd runner-up	
2017	India Banega Manch	Himself	Guest appearance	
2017	Bhaag Bakool Bhaag	Himself	Guest appearance	
2017	Bigg Boss 11	Himself	Guest appearance	
2017	The Drama Company	Host		
2017	Lip Sing Battle	Himself	Guest appearance	
2017–2018	Entertainment Ki Raat	Various Characters		
2018	Rising Star 2	Host		
2018	Tu Aashiqui	Himself	Guest appearance	
2018	Aap Ke Aa Jane Se	Himself	Guest appearance	
2018	Sabse Smart Kaun	Host		
2018	Jammin	Host		
2019	Sa Re Ga Ma Pa L'il Champs	Host		
2021–2024	Udaariyaan	Producer		
2021	Bigg Boss 15	Himself	Guest appearance	
2022	Swaran Ghar	Producer		
2023	Junooniyatt	Producer		
2023–2024	Daalchini	Producer		
2024	Badall Pe Paon Hai	Producer		
2025–present	Ganga Mai Ki Betiyan	Producer		
2025–present	Tu Juliet Jatt Di	Producer		
2026–present	Sayoneee	Producer		

=== Web series ===
Year	Title	Role	Notes	Ref.
2019–2021	Jamai 2.0	Siddharth Khurana		
2021	Matsya Kaand	Matsya		
2023	Lakhan Leela Bhargava (LLB)	Lakhan Leela Bhargava		
2024–2025	Dil Ko Rafu Karr Lei	–	Producer	
2024–2025	Lovely Lolla	–	Producer	
2025	Haale Dil	–	Producer	
2025	Tu Aashiki Haii	–	Producer	

=== Music videos ===
Year	Title	Singer(s)
2020	Toxic	Badshah and Payal Dev
2024	Ve Haaniyaan	Danny
2025	Fanaa Karr De	Danny and Avvy Sra

== Discography ==
Year	Title	Album	Notes	Ref.
2019	"Rubaru"	Jamai 2.0		
2020	"Aankde"	N/A	Poem	

== Awards ==
Year	Award	Category	Work	Result	Ref.
2015	Indian Television Academy Awards	GR8! Face Of The Year-Male	Jamai Raja	Won	
2016	Gold Awards	Best Onscreen Jodi (With Nia Sharma)	Jamai Raja	Won	
2018	Gold Awards	Best Anchor	Rising Star 2	Won	
