= Nigah Marda Ayi Ve =

2023 Indian Punjabi-language

- Directed by: Rupinder Inderjit
- Written by: Rupinder Inderjit
- Produced by: Raman Aggarwal; Vishal Johal
- Starring: Gurnam Bhullar; Sargun Mehta
- Cinematography: Sam Malhi
- Music by: Gaurav Dev; Kartik Dev; Desi Crew; Daddy Beats; Daoud Music; Score: Sandeep Saxena
- Production companies: Top Notch Studios UK; Diamondstar Worldwide
- Distributed by: Omjee Star Studios
- Release date: 17 March 2023
- Running time: 123 minutes
- Country: India
- Language: Punjabi

Nigah Marda Ayi Ve is a 2023 Punjabi-language, romantic-drama film written and directed by Rupinder Inderjit, starring Gurnam Bhullar and Sargun Mehta.

== Synopsis ==
An adventurous road trip takes Harman and Scarlett on a journey not only through love and life but also leaves them heartbroken.

== Cast ==
- Gurnam Bhullar as Harmandeep Singh
- Sargun Mehta as Scarlett Sandhu
- Nisha Bano as Jessica Sandhu
- Jasneet Kooner as Misha
- Adi Chugh

== Release ==
The film was released on 17 March 2023.

== Reception ==
Punjab Mania published a positive review of the film. Reviews from The Times of India and The Indian Express were more critical.
