= Sabse Smart Kaun? =

- Genre: Game show
- Presented by: Ravi Dubey
- Country of origin: India
- Original language: Hindi
- No. of seasons: 1
- No. of episodes: 80

Production
- Production company: Optimystix Entertainment

Original release
- Network: Star Plus
- Release: 4 June – 21 September 2018

Sabse Smart Kaun? (transl. Who is Smarter?) is a Hindi reality show aired on StarPlus. It premiered on 4 June 2018 on StarPlus. It was launched on StarPlus under the Rishta Wahi, Baat Nayi Campaign. The play-along feature enables the viewers to participate in each round using their phones enabling the game to be open for People who can play along through the Hotstar app.
