= Sargun Mehta =

Indian actress and film producer (born 1988)

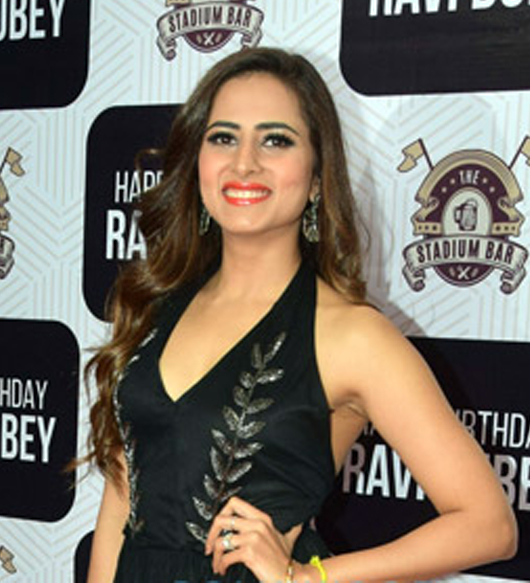
- Mehta in 2017
- Born: 6 September 1988 (age 38); Chandigarh, India
- Education: Kirori Mal College
- Occupations: Actress; model; producer
- Years active: 2009–present
- Spouse: Ravi Dubey (m. 2013)

Sargun Mehta (born 6 September 1988) is an Indian actress, model, and producer who predominantly works in Hindi television and Punjabi films. One of the highest paid Punjabi actress, Mehta is the recipient of five PTC Punjabi Film Awards and two Filmfare Awards Punjabi.

Mehta began acting in theatre productions in her college, and later ventured into television roles, having made her screen debut in 2009 with 12/24 Karol Bagh. Her notable roles include Phulwa (2011–2012), Kya Huaa Tera Vaada (2012–2013) and Balika Vadhu (2013–2014).

Mehta made her film debut with the 2015 Punjabi film Angrej; and earned her the PTC Punjabi Film Award for Best Actress. Her performance in Love Punjab (2016) and Lahoriye (2017) won her two Filmfare Awards Punjabi for Best Actress. Mehta has since earned praises for playing a modern woman in Qismat (2018) and Qismat 2 (2021), a beautician in Surkhi Bindi (2019) and a police officer in Cuttputlli (2022), which marked her debut in Hindi films.

== Early life and education ==
Mehta was born on 6 September 1988 in Chandigarh, India, She has a younger brother. As a child, along with her brother, Mehta auditioned for the dance reality show Boogie Woogie; they were both rejected. Mehta did her schooling at the Sacred Heart Convent school and Carmel Convent School in Chandigarh. She did her graduation in Bachelor of commerce from the Kirori Mal College, Delhi University. She then began studying for a Master's degree in Business Management, but left to pursue her acting career. Thereafter, she was cast in the television programme 12/24 Karol Bagh. After the programme ended, she shifted to Mumbai.

== Career ==
=== Acting debut, early work and recognition (2009–2011) ===
Mehta began her career with theatre shows. During her three years in college in Delhi, she performed in several theatrical productions. Later, she was selected for the supporting role in Zee TV's 2009 television programme 12/24 Karol Bagh. In it, she appeared opposite Ravi Dubey in the role of Neetu Sethi, an effervescent young woman. The show tells the story of four children, Simi, Anuj, Neetu and Mili, of the Sethi family, which lives in the middle-class locality of Karol Bagh in Delhi. Neetu is the third sibling out of the four, who is married to the mentally challenged Omi (played by Ravi Dubey). In an interview with The Hindu, Mehta said that she gained the role by accident: "My friends and I from the theatre club were asked by one of our professors to audition for the role and I landed Neetu's part".

Following the programme's end, Mehta portrayed the lead in another Zee TV production, Apno Ke Liye Geeta Ka Dharmayudh. In the show, which first aired in December 2010, she played the role of Geeta, who stands up for truth and saves her family from being ruined because of the misuse of section 498A which aims to protect women from domestic violence and abuse. In May 2011, the show went off-air after it failed to gain popularity.

In January 2011, Mehta featured as the lead protagonist opposite Ajay Chaudhary in Siddharth Tewary's drama series Phulwa on Colors TV, in which she played the title role. The story is loosely based on the life of Phoolan Devi, the dacoit-turned politician. Referencing her work in the series, she said, "when I did Phulwa it became the significant turning point of my career, which gave me recognition and creative satisfaction as well". The following year, she appeared in an episode of Sony television's crime series Crime Patrol, as Aarti Shekhar.

=== Balika Vadhu and further success in television (2012–2015) ===
In 2012, Mehta was chosen to play the pivotal role of Sonia in Fireworks Productions' suspense/thriller series Hum Ne Li Hai... Shapath, opposite Rahil Azam. The story revolved around a murder that took place at a rave party.

Mehta then guest-starred as Anika, opposite Karan Patel in Shontara Productions' Teri Meri Love Stories Star Plus network anthology series in August 2012.

At the end of October 2012, Mehta was approached for the role of Aradhya in Shashi Mittal's show Dil Ki Nazar Se Khoobsurat, but was removed from the show due to conceptual changes.

Ekta Kapoor's soap opera Kya Huaa Tera Vaada was Mehta's next show. In it, she played an independent girl character after a ten-year leap in the show's storyline. Co-starring alongside Mohit Malhotra, Mona Singh, Mouli Ganguly, and Neelam Sivia, she was cast as grown-up Bulbul, a journalist. She began shooting on 5 December and was telecast in mid-December 2012. She said: "My character has different shades. I haven't done this kind of role before. The show went off the air near the end of May 2013.

After acting in 12/24 Karol Bagh (2009), Phulwa (2011) and Kya Huaa Tera Vaada (2012), she portrayed a docile character role of Ganga in Colors drama series Balika Vadhu. In an interview with Hindustan Times, Mehta said that she was surprised to be offered the role, as it was not her usual character. In mid-November 2014, she quit the show due to creative dissatisfaction.

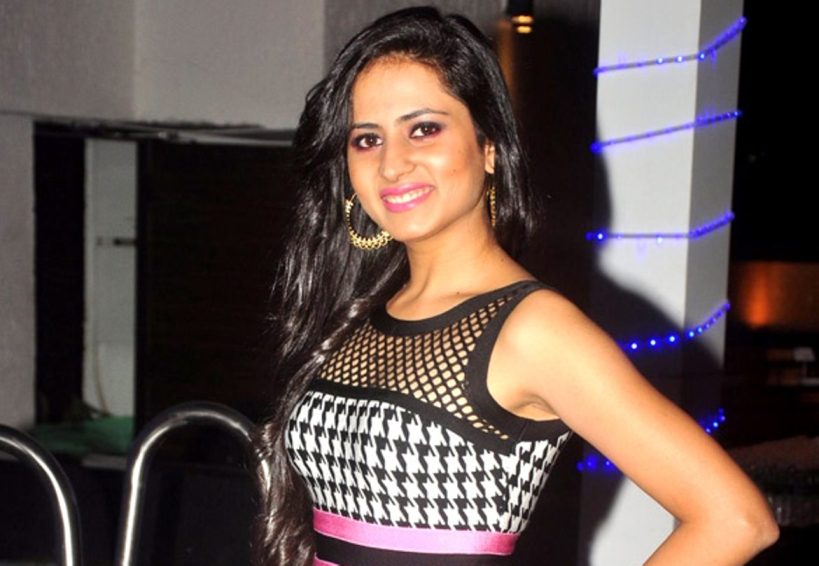
Mehta in 2015

In September 2014, Mehta participated in the reality show, Bigg Boss 8 as a contestant, but she got eliminated in the first episode itself. After a long break from fiction shows, Mehta made a comeback with the Zee TV's mini series Rishton Ka Mela, she began shoot for the show on 16 April 2015, In it, she played the central character Deepika, who is a young beautiful girl of today's modern era. The show had featured ten episodes, in which she starred alongside an ensemble cast of Eijaz Khan, Usha Nadkarni, Ratan Rajput, Anupam Shyam, Karan Mehra, Hiten Tejwani, Gauri Pradhan Tejwani, Sayantani Ghosh and Karan Grover. The show followed the journey of Deepika, a runaway bride, escaping from her cruel police inspector fiancé (played by Eijaz Khan). Deepika runs into a fair where she meets women that each have a story to tell. The show went off-air on 8 May 2015.

=== Established actress in Punjabi cinema (2015–present) ===
In July 2015, Mehta made her filming debut with Angrej, in a Punjabi film directed by Simerjit Singh, alongside Amrinder Gill, Aditi Sharma. In this film she portrayed the central role of Dhan Kaur. The film had receive significant opening in India, which earned ₹40.50 million (US$420,000) in its first week. The film grossed ₹124.5 million (US$1.3 million) in the international markets in 17 days, and emerged as the second highest grossing Punjabi film of 2015. In 2016, she appeared in Love Punjab as Jessica Brar. She got Filmfare Award for Best Actress (Punjabi films) for her portrayal of Jessica. She later participated in the sports reality show, Box Cricket League 2.

In 2017, she appeared in Jindua as Saggi, and in Lahoriye as Amiran, which got her second Filmfare Awards for Best Actress for the film.

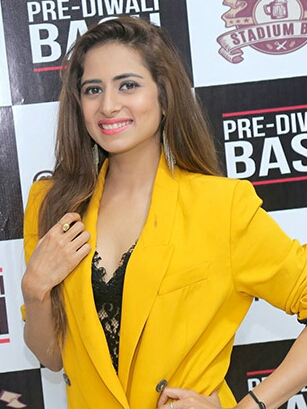
Mehta in 2017

In 2018 she portrayed Baani in Qismat, and got PTC Film Awards for Best Actress.

In 2019, she gave commercial hit Kala Shah Kala with Binnu Dhillon, which is the highest grossing Punjabi film of 2019 as yet. Her second release was Chandigarh Amritsar Chandigarh with Gippy Grewal. Her third release of the year was Surkhi Bindi with Gurnam Bhullar. Gurnaaz of The Tribune Gurnaaz praised the performance of Mehta, and said, "Watch it for the stellar act displayed by Sargun Mehta and Gurnam Bhullar, their exhilarating love story and the happy ending that stays with you even when you step out of the theatre." Her fourth release was quirky comedy Jhalle opposite Binnu Dhillon, co-produced by herself with Dhillon, and Munish Walia. It was released on 15 November.

In 2020, Mehta starred in the music video for "Titliaan" with Harrdy Sandhu.

In 2021, her film Qismat 2, a sequel to her 2018 film Qismat, was released on 24 September.

In 2022, she appeared in romantic comedy film Saunkan Saunkne opposite Ammy Virk and Nimrat Khaira, and Ghund Kadh Le Ni Sohreyan Da Pind Aa Gaya with Gurnam Bhullar, released on 8 July. Her third film of the year Moh, with Jagdeep Sidhu, the director of her earlier film series Qismat, will be released on 16 September 2022.

In 2019, she has opened her own production house Dreamiyata Entertainment Pvt Ltd, with her husband Ravi Dubey and co-produced a film Jhalle. In 2021, Dreamiyata Entertainment produced television series Udaariyaan, which airs on Colors TV.

=== Television ===
In October 2012, Mehta participated in Sony Entertainment Television's reality-based Comedy Circus series titled Comedy Circus Ke Ajoobe, along with Kapil Sharma. It was her first foray into comedy. In January 2013, she quit the show due to her busy schedule involving multiple other programmes.

Mehta walked the ramp at the prestigious award the twelfth Indian Television Academy (ITA)'s fashion event titled, Fashion Ka Jalwa on 4 November 2012. In December 2012, Mehta participated in the fifth season of Star Plus' celebrity couple dance reality show Nach Baliye. She was joined by Ravi Dubey, and on a 23 March 2013 finale episode, she was announced as the first runner-up of show. In addition, she participated in another version of show, entitled Nach Baliye Shriman v/s Shrimati, in which the couples competed against each other. The mini-series began in April 2013, and Mehta competed against Dubey. On 24 May 2013, Mehta walked the ramp as showstopper at Gitanjali Fashion Nights in Mumbai.

In December 2013, she made a special appearance in the sixth season of Nach Baliye, along with Dubey. By the end of 2013, mehta landed her first television hosting assignment with special children's season of Sony Entertainment Television's dance reality show Boogie Woogie.

In January 2014, Mehta featured in the print campaign for the 2014 GR8! TV Magazine's 15th calendar edition, GR8! Love Stories Calendar, which featured twelve real life television couples. She appeared along with her husband, Dubey. The first edition of the calendar was shot by the fashion photographer Pravin Talan, and it was launched by Anu Ranjan and Shashi Ranjan, founders of GR8 Entertainment Ltd., at a Gala event on 6 January 2014. In mid-February 2014, Mehta appeared as a guest along with Sidharth Shukla, Ravi Dubey and Karan Wahi on Colors Television's comedy/talk show Comedy Nights with Kapil, performing in a special episode of Pinky Bua's (Upasana Singh) wedding. Mehta appeared as a special panel member on the show Bigg Boss 8, after getting evicted in the premiere. Bigg Boss 8 on 21 September 2014, along with Gautam Gulati and Sukirti Kandpal.

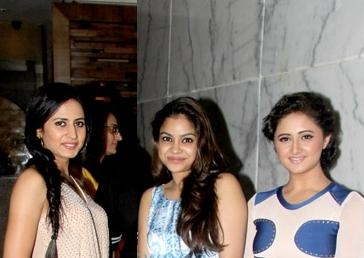
Mehta with Sumona Chakravarti (center) and Rashami Desai (right) on the sets of Comedy Nights with Kapil

On 18 February 2015, Mehta started to shoot for an episode of Colors TV's cookery/talk show Farah Ki Dawat, on which she appeared as a guest in its first episode along with actor Abhishek Bachchan. The show was hosted by filmmaker Farah Khan, and its first episode was telecast on 22 February 2015.

In May 2015, Mehta featured in the director Waseem Sabir's music video titled O Meri Jaan, in which she appeared alongside many actors, include Gautam Rode, Ruhana Khanna, Riddhi Dogra, Meiyang Chang and Hiten Tejwani. The music video highlights the father-daughter relationship, which spreads the message of the importance of raising a girl child with love. The video song sung by Suhail Zargar and It released on Father's Day.

In the second week of June 2015, Mehta was selected to appear as a special dance performer in the seventh season of Star Plus television's couple dance reality show Nach Baliye, in which she performed with the contestants Nandish Sandhu and Rashami Desai in special "Teen Ka Tadka" episode on first week of July 2015.

Mehta appeared as a guest-participant in the ninth season of the reality show Bigg Boss. She participated and teams up with Mandana Karimi and Rishabh Sinha on the day 23 in "Hotel BB" luxury budget task on 3 November 2015.

== Personal life ==
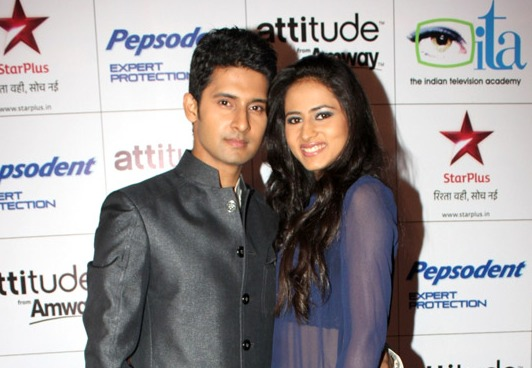
Sargun Mehta with her husband Ravi Dubey at 12th ITA Awards

Mehta began dating her 12/24 Karol Bagh co-star Ravi Dubey in 2009, and married him in December 2013. On 5 February 2013, in an interview with IndiaTimes, Mehta said that she and Dubey "always shared a good bond and understanding. But after doing Nach Baliye together we understand each other professionally more." After marrying, she changed her name to Sargun Mehta Dubey.

== Filmography ==
Key
†	Denotes films that have not yet been released

- All films are in Punjabi, unless otherwise noted.

Year	Title	Role	Notes	Ref.
2015	Angrej	Dhann Kaur		
2016	Love Punjab	Jessica Brar		
2017	Jindua	Saggi		
2017	Lahoriye	Amiran		
2018	Qismat	Baani		
2019	Kala Shah Kala	Pammi		
2019	Chandigarh Amritsar Chandigarh	Reet		
2019	Surkhi Bindi	Rano		
2019	Jhalle	Neena		
2021	Qismat 2	Baani		
2022	Saunkan Saunkne	Naseeb Kaur		
2022	Sohreyan Da Pind Aa Gaya	Roopi		
2022	Chhalla Mud Ke Nahi Aaya	Jeeto	Cameo appearance	
2022	Cuttputlli	SHO Gudiya Parmar	Hindi film	
2022	Moh	Gore		
2022	Babe Bhangra Paunde Ne	Preet		
2023	Nigah Marda Ayi Ve	Scarlett Sandhu		
2023	Sidhus of Southall	Tina Sidhu		
2024	Jatt Nuu Chudail Takri	Rani		
2025	Saunkan Saunkanay 2	Naseeb Kaur		
2025	Sarbala Ji	Rajjo		
2026	Carry On Jatta 4	Reet		

=== Television ===
==== As actress ====
Year	Title	Role	Notes	Ref.
2009	12/24 Karol Bagh	Neetu Sethi Dagar		
2010–2011	Apno Ke Liye Geeta Ka Dharmayudh	Geeta		
2011–2012	Phulwa	Phulwa Singh		
2011	Crime Patrol	Aarti Shekhar		
2012	Hum Ne Li Hai... Shapath	Sonia		
2012	Teri Meri Love Stories	Anika Saxena		
2012	Comedy Circus Ke Ajoobe	Contestant		
2012–2013	Kya Huaa Tera Vaada	Bulbul Ruhia		
2012–2013	Nach Baliye 5	Contestant	1st runner-up	
2013	Nach Baliye Shriman v/s Shrimati	Contestant		
2013–2014	Balika Vadhu	Ganga Singh		
2013–2014	Boogie Woogie Kids Championship	Host		
2014	Bigg Boss 8	Contestant	20th place	
2015	Farah Ki Dawat	Contestant		
2015	Rishton Ka Mela	Deepika		
2015	Bigg Boss 9	Herself	Guest appearance	
2016	Naya Akbar Birbal	Yakshini		
2016	Box Cricket League 2	Contestant		
2016	The Kapil Sharma Show	Dr. Sudha		
2017	Lip Sing Battle	Contestant		
2022	The Kapil Sharma Show	Herself		

==== As producer ====
Year	Title	Notes	Ref.
2021–2024	Udaariyaan	Along with husband Ravi Dubey	
2022	Swaran Ghar	Along with husband Ravi Dubey	
2023	Junooniyat	Along with husband Ravi Dubey	
2023–2024	Dalchini	Along with husband Ravi Dubey	
2024	Badall Pe Paon Hai	Along with husband Ravi Dubey	
2024–2025	Lovely Lolla	Along with husband Ravi Dubey	
2024–2025	Dil Ko Rafu Karr Lei	Along with husband Ravi Dubey	
2025	Haale Dil	Along with husband Ravi Dubey	
2025	Tu Aashiiki Haii	Along with husband Ravi Dubey	
2025–present	Ganga Mai Ki Betiyan	Along with husband Ravi Dubey	
2025–present	Tu Juliet Jatt Di	Along with husband Ravi Dubey	
2026–present	Sayoneee	Along with husband Ravi Dubey	

=== Music video appearances ===
Year	Title	Singer	Ref.
2017	"Qismat"	Ammy Virk	
2019	"Laare"	Maninder Buttar	
2020	"Nach Nach"	Gippy Grewal	
2020	"Toxic"	Payal Dev, Badshah	
2020	"Taare Baliye"	Ammy Virk	
2020	"Titliaan"	Afsana Khan	
2021	"Titliaan Warga"	Harrdy Sandhu, Jaani	
2022	"Mere Kol"	Afsana Khan	
2024	"Ve Haaniyaan"	Danny	

== Awards and nominations ==
Year	Award	Category	Work	Result	Ref.
2014	Indian Television Academy Awards	GR8! Performer Of The Year – Female	Balika Vadhu	Nominated	
2016	PTC Punjabi Film Awards	Best Actress	Angrej	Won	
2016	PTC Punjabi Film Awards	Best Female Debut	Angrej	Nominated	
2017	PTC Punjabi Film Awards	Best Actress	Love Punjab	Won	
2017	Filmfare Awards Punjabi	Best Actress	Love Punjab	Won	
2018	Filmfare Awards Punjabi	Best Actress	Lahoriye	Won	
2018	PTC Punjabi Film Awards	Best Actress	Lahoriye	Won	
2019	PTC Punjabi Film Awards	Best Actress	Qismat	Won	
2020	PTC Punjabi Film Awards	Best Actress	Surkhi Bindi	Nominated	
2022	PTC Punjabi Film Awards	Best Actress – Critics	Qismat 2	Won	
2022	Indian Television Academy Awards	Best Story	Udaariyaan	Won	

== See also ==
- List of Hindi television actresses
- List of Indian television actresses
- List of Indian television actors
