= Guddiyan Patole =

2019 Indian film by Vijay Kumar Arora

- Theatrical release poster
- Directed by: Vijay Kumar Arora
- Written by: Jagdeep Sidhu
- Screenplay by: Jagdeep Sidhu
- Produced by: Bhagwant Virk; Nav Virk
- Starring: Gurnam Bhullar; Sonam Bajwa; Tania; Nirmal Rishi
- Cinematography: Jalesh Oberoi
- Edited by: Bunty Nagi
- Music by: Sahil Singh
- Production company: Villagers Film Studio
- Distributed by: In House Group (India); Rhythm Boyz Entertainment (Overseas)
- Release date: 8 March 2019 (India)
- Running time: 127 minutes
- Country: India
- Language: Punjabi

Guddiyan Patole is a 2019 Indian Punjabi language family drama film written by Jagdeep Sidhu and directed by Vijay Kumar Arora. The film stars Gurnam Bhullar, Sonam Bajwa, Tania, and Nirmal Rishi in lead roles. The film was released theatrically on 8 March 2019.

== Plot ==
Nicole and Kashmeer or Kash are sisters living separately in Canada because of their parents divorce. Nicole lives with her mother Manjeet while Kash lives with her father Johnson, and her stepmother and stepbrother. Manjeet has a broken bond with her family because she married someone of her choice. One day, Manjeet receives a letter from her family in Punjab as an invitation for a kid's birthday party. Manjeet tells Nicole to go and take Kash along with her.

Amreek goes to pick them up from the airport with the intention to marry one of them. When they reach Manjeet's family's home, everyone is happy to see them except for their grandmother Jal Kaur (Nirmal Rishi), who is still upset with Manjeet (whom she has not let into the house for years) and is angry that they invited Manjeet's daughters without her permission.

Meanwhile, Beauty (Honey mattu), their aunt's nephew tries to woo Nicole and ends up getting beaten by Kash. One night, Kash gets drunk and tells everyone that women and men are equal and that if women have made dinner, they should eat it first. Amreek decides Kash is too wild for him, and decides to try to woo Nicole instead.

On the phone, Manjeet tells Nicole to go talk to her grandmother. Nicole is worried that her grandma will beat them up but Manjeet assures her that she was only beaten up one time by her mother when she wore a flowered suit (she tells them to ask about that). Nicole and Kash go to their grandma, and she tells them to leave and refuses to tell them the flowered suit incident. Before going, Nicole tells Jal that Manjeet loves her very much.

After coming back from a suit shop, Kash intentionally shouts to her cousin that she bought many flowered suits and no one can stop her from wearing them outside Jal's room. Jal goes to a cabinet in her room and takes out a flowered suit, and recalls the time when she hit her daughter for wearing the suit.

At the birthday party they were invited for, Kash sees that the men are seated on chairs while the women are sitting and cooking rotis. She tells Manjeet's younger brother that he should be ashamed and that women should also be treated the same as men. He glares at the women, and they continue cooking. Kash then throws a bucket of water there so that they can't cook any more rotis.

Manjeet's two brothers and their wives have a discussion with Kash and Nicole. They want them to sign papers so that they won't get a share of their land in Punjab, saying that they don't want any disputes concerning land in the future and that Manjeet, Kash & Nicole are well settled in Canada. Nicole and Kash sign the papers. Kash tells Nicole not to tell Manjeet.

When Nicole and Kash are leaving, Jal gives them the flowered suit and tells them to give it to their mother. In the car, Nicole points out that Jal sent a suit for Manjeet, and Manjeet didn't send anything for Jal. Kash suddenly realises that Manjeet sent them for Jal. She tells Amreek to turn the car around, and they go back and convince Jal to come with them, that they will enjoy full life for 5-7 days. She complies, and they go out and have fun together.

Kash gets drunk at a party and dances, and Jal disagrees with their idea of "fun". Kash tells Jal to prove that you can dance without getting drunk, and Jal, with Amreek, dances to a song. Kash tells Jal that Manjeet used to say that she is exactly like her grandma; not fully beautiful, yet very high attitude.

They go to Jal's sister's granddaughter's wedding, where her nephew's wife tells her that if she didn't see her daughter's wedding, at least she saw this wedding. They get into a fight, and Jal, Nicole, Kash & Amreek go to Jal's brother's house and visit the Gurdwara where Guru Gobind Singh Ji chose the Panj Pyare. Later on, Kash tells Jal that she wants to get a tattoo of Justin Bieber, and Jal tells her not to, that it attracts unwanted attention. Kash sees Amreek looking at her, and she hits him.

Amreek is still not sure who he should choose; Kash or Nicole. His mind says Nicole, but his heart says Kash. Jal calls him and tells him that she knows he wants to woo Kash or Nicole and she supports him; but, after he's chosen one, he can't eye the other.

They go back home and Jal scolds her sons for making Kash and Nicole sign the papers. They both come out with the papers and rip them, but the elder brother accidentally ripped a child's school certificate instead of the papers, while the other brother ripped the papers, and everyone laughs.

Amreek asks Nicole to help him in telling Kash he likes her (he has chosen Kash). She tells him that if she tells Kash, Kash will reply saying if he can't say it himself, how will he fulfill his promise? Beauty and a Punjabi farmer come and expose their intentions of marrying Kash and Nicole and going to Canada. The family ties them together and beats them; Kash joins in the beating.

Then, it's time for Kash and Nicole to go back. At the airport, Kash tells Nicole that she will be staying here, that she wants to spend time with Jal since she doesn't know how much time Jal has left. She tells Nicole to go and come back with Manjeet. Amreek, who was upset, gets excited when he sees Kash coming back. She tells him to take her to a tattoo parlor, and he agrees.

When she comes back, she tells everyone that she's staying for good, she won't go back and she's thinking of opening a restaurant. Jal notices the new tattoo on her arm and realises that it's her name: Jal Kaur. She hugs Kash. Amreek asks to talk with Kash in private but Kash says that they are a family so tell everyone. He tells Jal first that he has chosen and to save him from getting beaten, then he tells Kash that he likes her a lot and wants to marry her, and if she opens a restaurant, he will peel the potatoes. Kash agrees, and everyone celebrates.

Later on, Kash tells Amreek that now his dream of going to Canada is ruined since she won't be going back. He replies saying that wherever she is, that is his Canada. The movie ends with the song 'Guddiyan Patole'.

== Cast ==
- Sonam Bajwa as Kashmeer ‘Kash’ Kaur
- Tania as Nicole
- Nirmal Rishi as Naani Jal Kaur
- Gurnam Bhullar as Amreek
- Rupinder Rupi as Maami Mukho
- Gurmeet Saajan as Ajaib Singh
- Honey Mattu as Beauty

== Production ==
Principal photography of the film took place between November 2018 and December 2018.

== Soundtrack ==
The film's music was composed by V Rakx, Ikwinder Singh, and Sukh-E, with lyrics by Gurnam Bhullar, Garry Vinder, Vicky Dhaliwal, and Harinder Kaur.

No.	Title	Singer(s)	Length
1.	"Guddiyan Patole"	Gurnam Bhullar	3:32
2.	"Mohobatt"	Lucky Ropar
3.	"Athri Jawani"	Ammy Virk, Gulrez Akhtar
4.	"Lakk De Hulare"	Gurnam Bhullar
5.	"Ishq Diya Shuruvatan"	Gurnam Bhullar
6.	"Maye Ni"	Gurnam Bhullar
7.	"Lakk De Hulare" (Remix)	Gurnam Bhullar

== Reception ==
As of 17 March 2019, the film has grossed ₹1 crore worldwide, including est. ₹6 crore at overseas. In Canada and Australia the film trended in its second weekend even after new releases. The film is also one of the highest grossing Punjabi films in Canada.

In India, Guddiyan Patole was expected to earn ₹50 lakh on its opening day but earned ₹65 lakhs and became the highest grossing Punjabi female lead film. The film collected ₹2.51 crore in its opening weekend. At overseas the film grossed ₹2.25 crore in its opening weekend including ₹1.35 crore from United States and Canada only. In its second weekend the collections just dropped by 15% at North America and the screens were also increased from 25 to 36.
