= Saunkan Saunkne =

2022 Indian film by Amarjit Singh Saron

- Official release poster
- Directed by: Amarjit Singh Saron
- Written by: Amberdeep Singh
- Produced by: Sargun Mehta; Ravi Dubey; Jatin Sethi
- Starring: Ammy Virk; Sargun Mehta; Nimrat Khaira
- Narrated by: Yogesh Grover
- Cinematography: Sana Ravi Kumar
- Edited by: Rohit Dhiman
- Music by: Sandeep Saxena
- Production companies: Naad Studios; Dreamiyata; JR Production House
- Distributed by: Zee Studios; White Hill Studios
- Release date: 13 May 2022
- Running time: 150 minutes
- Country: India
- Language: Punjabi
- Box office: est. ₹55 crore

Saunkan Saunkne (transl. Co-Wife [or] Husband's other wife) is a 2022 Indian Punjabi-language romantic comedy film directed by Amarjit Singh Saron. The film made under the banner of Naad SStudios, Dreamiyata Pvt. Ltd and JR Production House, stars Ammy Virk, Sargun Mehta and Nimrat Khaira. It was released on 13 May 2022 in theaters.

The film is currently among the sixth highest-grossing Punjabi films with a worldwide gross of ₹55 crore in forty five days of its release. A sequel, titled Saunkan Saunkanay 2 was released in 2025.

== Synopsis ==
Nirmal and Naseeb are a happily married couple. They have everything except a child. After eight years of marriage they still miss something. On suggestion of her mother-in-law, Naseeb persuades Nirmal to have a second marriage with her younger sister Kirna. The real drama begins as sharing her husband proves to be a difficult task for Naseeb. Kirna dominates and wins the heart of her husband and mother-in-law and that changes everything for Naseeb. Small squabbles between the two wives lead to comic situation and fun begins.

== Cast ==
- Ammy Virk as Nirmal Singh (husband)
- Sargun Mehta as Naseeb "Seebo" Kaur (first wife)
- Nimrat Khaira as Kirna (second wife)
- Nirmal Rishi as mother of Nirmal Singh
- Kaka Kautki as Naseeb and Kirna's brother
- Sukhwinder Chahal as Naseeb and Kirna's father and Nirmal's father-in-law
- Mohini Toor as Naseeb and Kirna's mother and Nirmal's mother-in-law
- Ravinder Mand
- Gagneet Singh Makhan as Kiran's fiancé

== Production ==
=== Development ===
The film was announced in June 2020 with lead cast of Ammy Virk, Sargun Mehta and Nimrat Khaira.

=== Filming ===
Principal photography of Saunkan Saunkne began in October 2020 and the film was completed within a couple of months.

== Music ==
Soundtrack of Saunkan Saunkne is composed by Desi Crew on lyrics by Raj Ranjodh, Bunty Bains, Rony Ajnali, Gill Machhrai and Arjan Virk. The songs are sung by Ammy Virk, Nimrat Khaira, Raj Ranjodh, Miss Pooja and Gurlez Akhtar. The soundtrack is released on Tips Punjabi. First track "Gall Mann Le Meri" was released on April 24, 2022. Second track "Sade Kothe Ute" was released on 1 May 2022. Title track "Saunkan Saunkne" was released on 4 May 2022.

=== Track list ===
No.	Title	Lyrics	Singer(s)	Length
1.	"Gall Mann Le Meri"	Rony Ajnali, Gill Machhrai	Gurlez Akhtar	2:59
2.	"Sade Kothe Ute"	Bunty Bains	Ammy Virk, Nimrat Khaira	3.22
3.	"Saunkan Saunkne"	Rony Ajnali, Gill Machhrai	Ammy Virk, Nimrat Khaira, Miss Pooja	3.04
4.	"Taur Sardar Saab Di"	Arjan Virk	Ammy Virk	2.19
5.	"Sohni Sohni"	Happy Raikoti	Ammy Virk	3.18
6.	"Dholna Ve Dholna"	Raj Ranjodh	Raj Ranjodh	3.21

== Release ==
Initially film was slated to release on 14 April 2022 but it was postponed to 6 May 2022. But, it was pushed back and theatrically released on 13 May 2022.It is available on amazon prime video from June 2022.

== Reception ==
=== Critical response ===
Neha Vashist rated the film with 3.5 stars out of 5 and appreciated the story by Amberdeep Singh and direction of Amarjit Singh Saron, stating, "Every scene in the movie had a lingering effect, and that happens only when the captain of the ship has a tight grip over his project." Praising the performance of cast, she wrote, "everyones’ performance was engaging and the script in itself was very entertaining; thus, it is a laughter riot." Vashist criticised the length of the film stating, "The movie seemed a little stretched in the second half". Concluding the review for The Times of India, she said, "Nevertheless, it still offers you a great dose of laughter and is a perfect family entertainer."

Sheetal, writing for The Tribune, praised the performance, direction and music of the film. She appreciated the comedy writing, "The film is packed with punches and some of them are even worth taking home!" Concluding her review, she stated, "It’s tough to decide whether acting, casting, direction or script has a bigger role to play in it [star cast performances]!" Kiddaan rated the film with 3.5 stars out of 5 and praised the performances of lead actors writing, "All three of the lead actors proved to be really acclaimed and masters of their art." They were critical of screenplay and the direction of the film but appreciated the dialogues and the music. Appreciating the comedy sequences, Kiddaan concluded, "we conclude the film as a good entertainer which has the power to uplift your mood and make your family share a bundle of laughter."

=== Box office ===
Saunkan Saunkne earned ₹2.25 crore in domestic box office on first day of its release. The film collected ₹4.52 crore at the North America box office, ₹1.2 crore from Australia, ₹91.11 lakhs from UK & Ireland, ₹35.09 lakhs at the New Zealand box office and ₹4.39 lakhs from Germany over the first weekend. Its Indian collection for the weekend is ₹9.18 crore, and as of 17 May 2022 it is ₹13.16 crore.

The film as of 9 June 2022, has grossed ₹57.60 crore worldwide.
