= Matsya Kaand =

Indian Crime thriller television series

- Genre: Crime thriller
- Written by: Namesh Dubey
- Directed by: Ajay Bhuyan
- Starring: see below
- Music by: Joash Benedict; Reuel Benedict
- Country of origin: India
- Original language: Hindi
- No. of seasons: 1
- No. of episodes: 11

Production
- Producer: Deepak Dhar
- Cinematography: Shanu Singh Rajput; Manojh Reddy Katasani
- Editors: Bhupesh 'Micky' Sharma; Faruk Yusuf Akayran
- Running time: 20-40 minutes
- Production company: Banijay Asia

Original release
- Network: MX Player
- Release: 18 November 2021

Matsya Kaand is an Indian Hindi-language crime thriller television series produced under the banner of Banijay Asia. The series stars Ravi Dubey, Ravi Kishan, Piyush Mishra, Zoya Afroz, Madhur Mittal, Rajesh Sharma and Naved Aslam. It premiered on MX Player on 18 November 2021.

In December 2021, It was reported that the show crossed 100 million views since its release.

== Plot ==
Matsya Thada is an honourable con artist, who instead of using his brawn, conducts his 'kaand' with aptitude, intelligence, and charm. He's known for pulling off some of the country's most daring and biggest cons, and he always manages to get past the cops as he moves from one operation to the next. However, fate throws him a new curveball when ACP Tejraj Singh is given charge of his case. Matsya challenges ACP Tejraj to catch him if he can, which leads to a game of cat and mouse that will surely keep you on the edge of your seat. Will ACP Tejraj succeed, or will Matsya win yet again?

== Cast ==
- Ravi Dubey as Matsya
- Ravi Kishan as ACP Tejraj
- Piyush Mishra
- Zoya Afroz
- Madhur Mittal
- Rajesh Sharma
- Naved Aslam

== Production ==
The series was announced by Banijay Asia, consisting of eleven episodes for MX Player. Ravi Dubey, Ravi Kishan, Piyush Mishra, Zoya Afroz, Madhur Mittal, Rajesh Sharma and Naved Aslam joined the cast. The principal photography of the series commenced in 2021 and were primarily shot in Delhi, Meerut, Sambhar and Jaipur. Ravi Dubey and Ravi Kishan promoted the series on Bigg Boss 15.

== Reception ==
Sunidhi Prajapat of OTT Play rated the series 2.5/5 stars. Hiren Kotwani of The Times of India rated the series 3/5 stars.

The series was reviewed by Manisha Lakhe for Moneycontrol.
