= Kurmaiyan =

- Directed by: Gurmeet Saajan and Manjit Singh Tony
- Story by: Manjit Tony
- Produced by: Gurmail Brar, Gurmeet Saajan
- Starring: Harjit Harman; Japji Khaira; Nirmal Rishi; Hobby Dhaliwal
- Production company: Winner Film Productions
- Release date: 14 September 2018
- Country: India
- Language: Punjabi

Kurmaiyan is an Indian Punjabi movie directed by Gurmeet Saajan and Manjit Singh Tony. Kurmayian stars Harjit Harman and Japji Khaira as the main protagonists of the film. The movie was released worldwide on 14 September 2018.

== Cast ==
- Harjit Harman ... Harjeet
- Japji Khaira ... Paali
- Gurmeet Saajan ... Master Joginder Singh 'Joga'
- Anita Devgan ... Dhann Kaur- Harjeet's Bhua
- Hardeep Gill ... Dhann Kaur - Harjeet's Phufad
- Nirmal Rishi ... Ambo Jai Kaur
- Harby Sangha ... Mitha Singh Vichola
- Hobby Dhaliwal
- Rakhi Hundal ... Charno
- Veet Baljit ... Charno's Husband
- Parminder Gill ... Surjeet Kaur- Harjeet's mother

== Technical Crew ==
- DOP - Barinder Sidhu
- Editor - Baljinder Muhar
- Production - Onkar Singh
- Colorist - imagination

== Track listing ==
Track	Song	Artist(s)	Lyrics	Music
1	Lanedarniye	Gurnam Bhullar	Various Artists	Atul Sharma, Gurmeet Singh,MixSingh
2	Punnyan Da Chann	Harjit Harman, Mannat Noor	Various Artists	Atul Sharma, Gurmeet Singh, MixSingh
3	Mekh Wangu	Nachatar Gill, Jaspinder Narula	Various Artists	Atul Sharma, Gurmeet Singh, MixSingh
4	Tere Baare	Harjit Harman, Raza Heer	Various Artists	Atul Sharma, Gurmeet Singh, MixSingh
5	Pta Ni Ki Ho Gya	Harjit Harman, Mannat Noor	Various Artists	Atul Sharma, Gurmeet Singh, MixSingh
