= Farah Ki Dawat =

- Also known as: Farah Ki Daawat
- Genre: Cookery
- Created by: Wizcraft International Entertainment
- Presented by: Farah Khan
- Country of origin: India
- Original language: Hindi
- No. of seasons: 01
- No. of episodes: 15

Production
- Producer: Wizcraft International Entertainment
- Running time: 55 minutes approx

Original release
- Network: Colors TV
- Release: 22 February – 7 June 2015

Farah Ki Dawat (transl. Farah's Feast) also known as Farah Ki Daawat is an Indian television cookery show, which premiered on 22 February 2015 which airs on Colors TV. The show is hosted by filmmaker Farah Khan.

== Guests appearance ==
The show has featured Kapil Sharma, Riteish Deshmukh, Genelia Deshmukh, Sajid Khan, Karan Johar, Manish Paul, Yuvraj Singh, Sania Mirza, Jacqueline Fernandez, Abhishek Bachchan, Gautam Gulati, Alia Bhatt, Boman Irani, Karan Tacker, Sargun Mehta and Malaika Arora Khan. as guests.
