= Jordan Sandhu =

Indian actor and singer (born 1994)

- Born: Jasminder Singh Sandhu
- Occupations: Actor, singer
- Years active: 2014–present
- Notable work: Handsome Jatta, Teeje Week
- Spouse: Jaspreet Kaur (m. 2022)

Jasminder Singh Sandhu known professionally as Jordan Sandhu is an Indian singer and actor from Punjab. He started his career in 2014 with the song Brand, written by Kumar Sunny, composed by Desi Crew, and released under the Fine Tone label.

Jordan Sandhu is best known for his singles Teeje Week, Muchh Rakhi Aa, and Handsome Jatta from Ashke.

He made his acting debut in Subedar Joginder Singh, which was released in 2018.

In 2016, he won the Punjabi Music Best Debut Vocalist (Male) Award at the PTC Punjabi Music Awards. He married Jaspreet Kaur in January 2022.

== Career ==
'Sandhu started his career with the song Brand, which was released under the record label Fine Tone in 2014. He later gained recognition with the song Much Phut Gabruu, released under the record label T-Series in 2015. He won the Best Debut Vocalist (male) Award at the PTC Punjabi Music Awards. In 2016, he released songs like Sardar Bandey and Muchh Rakhi Aa, followed by Birthday and others in 2017. In 2018, he released Teeje Week, Hero, and Handsome Jatta from Ashke his first film soundtrack.

== Discography ==
=== Extended Plays ===
Title	EP details	Lyrics
High Five	Released: 2022; Music: Desi Crew; Label: Speed Records; Format: Digital download, streaming	Kaptaan; Arjan Virk; Narinder Bath; Bunty Bains
Fame	Released: 12 July 2022; Music: Snappy, Mxrci, Jashan Inder; Label: Jordan Sandhu; Format: Digital download, streaming	Rav Hanjra, Kabal Saroopwali, Kahlon, Mandeep Mavi

== Singles discography ==
=== As lead artist ===
Song	Year	Music	Peak chart position		Lyrics	Label	Album
Song	Year	Music	UK Asian	UK Punjabi	Lyrics	Label	Album
Muchh Phut Gabrhu	2015	Desi Crew	—	—	Bunty Bains	T-Series	Won Best Debut vocalist Award
Bebe Di Pasand	2016	Desi Crew	12		Bunty Bains	Speed Records	
Kismat Di Maari	2016	Desi Crew		—	Romeo Randhawa	Speed Records	
Sardar Bandey (with Manni Sandhu)	2016	Manni Sandhu			Simran Dhadeyan	Speed Records	Welcome To The Future
Chhad Na Jaavin	2016	Anu Manu	—	—	Bunty Bains	Speed Records	
Muchh Rakhi Aa	2016	Desi Crw			Bunty Bains	White Hill Music	
Vichhdi Marjaani	2017	Desi Crw			Bunty Bains	Mp4 Records	
Ambersar Waala	2017	Desi Crw	—	—	Bunty Bains	Speed Records	
Daaru Pee Ke Roye Ni	2017	Wazir Patar			Deepa Bilaspuria	T-Series	
Bandh Karke Sheeshe Car De	2017	Jassi X			Bunty Bains	Bunty Bains Productions	
Birthday	2017	Jassi X	—	—	Bunty Bains	T-Series	
Draamebaaziyan	2017	Jassi X			Bunty Bains	Bunty Bains Productions	
Ik Mastaana	2017	The Boss			Bunty Bains	Bunty Bains Productions	
Mohali Waliye	2017	Jassi X			Bunty Bains	Brand B	
Teeje Week	2018	The Boss	7		Bunty Bains	White Hill Music	
Bang Bang	2018	Jay K			Bunty Bains	Humble Music	
Naa Sajna Da	2018	Desi Crew			Bunty Bains	Mp4 Records	
Handsome Jatta	2018	Davvy Singh			Bunty Bains	Rhythm Boyz Entertainment	Ashke soundtrack
Kaake Da Vyah	2019	Davvy Singh	—	—	Bunty Bains	White Hill Music	
Gabhru Nu Tarsengi	2019	The Boss			Bunty Bains	White Hill Music	
Jattiye Ni	2019	Jassi X			Arjan Virk	Saga Music	
Botal Free	2020	The Boss			Kaptaan	White Hill Music	
Bewafa Coka	2020	Jassi X	—	—	Bunty Bains	Once More Music	
Defend	2020	Snappy			Rav Hanjra	Jordan Sandhu	
About Me	2020	Snappy			Rav Hanjra	B Major	
Info (with Gurlez Akhtar)	2020	Snappy			Rav Hanjra	Saga Music	
Jatt Naal Yaari	2021	The Kidd			Arjan Virk	Saga Music	
Do Vaari Jatt	2021	Desi Crew	—	—	Arjan Virk	Bang Music	
Jyada Jachdi ft. Gurlez Akhtar	2021	Abhijit Baidwan			Nawab	Jordan Sandhu	
Jis Din Da Shad Gayi	2021	Jassi X			Amar Virk	Jordan Sandhu	
Munda Sardaran Da	2021	Flamme	—	—	Shree Brar	Jordan Sandhu	
Qatal (featuring Shree Brar)	2021	Avvy Sra			Shree Brar	Humble Music	Warning soundtrack
Russi Nu Manna Laina (featuring Shree Brar)	2021	Desi Crew			Shree Brar	White Hill Music	
Chann Chann	2021	Desi Crew	—	—	Arjan Virk	Speed Records	High Five EP
Black Effect	2022	Desi Crew	25		Kaptaan	Speed Records	High Five EP
Shehar Vichon Geda	2022	Desi Crew	35		Rav Hanjra	Speed Records	
Gal Ni Bani	2022	Abijit Baidwan			Gill Madhupuria	Jordan Sandhu	
Positivity	2022	Starboy X		—	Mani Longia	Jordan Sandhu	
Freestyle	2022	Mxrci	16	10	Rav Hanjra	Jordan Sandhu	Fame EP
Balcony	2022	Mxrci	40	—	Kabal Saroopwali	Jordan Sandhu	Fame EP

=== As featured artist ===
Title	Year	Music	Lyrics	Label	Album
Jodhpur (Dilpreet Dhillon featuring Jordan Sandhu)	2021	Desi Crew	Narinder Batth	Speed Records	Next Chapter
Sheesha (Pari Pandher featuring Jordan Sandhu)	2021	Chet Singh	Bunty Bains	Brand B	

== Filmography ==
Key
†	Denotes films that have not yet been released

Year	Film	Role	Notes	Language
2018	Subedar Joginder Singh	Bant Singh		Punjabi
2019	Kaake Da Viyah			Punjabi
2019	Kala Shah Kala	Jaggi	with Binnu Dhillon and Sargun Mehta	Punjabi
2019	Gidarh Singhi	Bittu	with Rubina Bajwa	Punjabi
