= Kala Shah Kala =

- First look poster
- Directed by: Amarjit Singh Saron
- Written by: Amarjit Singh Saron
- Produced by: Harsimran Dhillon; Gursimran Dhillon; Achal kaushal Navaniat Singh; Ravi Dubey; Binnu Dhillon; Karan Soni
- Starring: Binnu Dhillon; Sargun Mehta; Jordan Sandhu; Karamjit Anmol; Shehnaaz Kaur Gill
- Cinematography: Ravi Kumar Sana
- Edited by: Rohit Dhiman
- Music by: Bunty Bains; Jaidev Kumar; Jaggi Singh; Jatinder Shah
- Production companies: Infantry Pictures; Naughty Men Productions
- Distributed by: Zee Studios
- Release date: 14 February 2019 (India)
- Country: India
- Language: Punjabi
- Box office: est. ₹19 crore

Kala Shah Kala (transl. Purely black) is a 2019 Indian Punjabi-language romantic comedy film written and directed by Amarjit Singh. The film is produced by Infantry Pictures and Naughty Men Productions in association with Dreamityata Entertainment. It stars Binnu Dhillon, Sargun Mehta, and Jordan Sandhu, and follows the story of Lovely, a happy and charming guy who struggles to find the love of his life because of his dark complexion. It was scheduled to release on 15 March 2019, but opened early on 14 February 2019. It opened to positive reviews and became a commercial success, earning over ₹19 crore worldwide. It is the 21st highest grossing Punjabi film.

== Plot ==
An old woman ‘Nindro Bhua’, who works as a matchmaker, is admitted to hospital for an overnight recovery. She regains consciousness later that evening, and tells her nurse that she arranged her father's marriage amongst hundreds of others. To the pleasure of a number of hospital staff, she narrates the story Pammi and Lovely (nicknamed 'Naag').

Lovely has very dark skin and nobody is willing to marry him because of his appearance. His marriage proposals are rejected on every occasion. Pammi, on other hand, is a beautiful girl, yet for some unknown reason she is also not yet married. Nindro Bhua sends a proposal for their marriage and their marriage is fixed. It is revealed that Pammi is not happy with this proposal, as she secretly loves Jaggi, a guy who lives in her village at a relatives.

After they are both married, to get rid of Lovely, Pammi starts acting as if she is possessed by a ghost. Lovely and his superstitious family start getting frightened by her. One day, a drunken Lovely is not affected by Pammi's act and she reveals the truth that she loves Jaggi and was forced into marry him. Lovely agrees to meet Jaggi with her. Nindro Bhua has convinced them to wait until Paal has married otherwise it would affect his marriage. In the meantime, Lovely starts romancing Pammi so she does not leave him to marry Jaggi.

During Paal's wedding Jaggi is attempting to convince Pammi's family members one by one by taking care of them. Lovely's friends advised him to work hard on keeping her other wise he would lose her to Jaggi. He then he starts washing utensils, cutting vegetables and logs. In meantime Pammi and Jaggi have an argument and Jaggi goes away, however Lovely asks them to meetup again in order to see Pammi happy. They then both decide to leave after Paal's wedding. The next day, at railway station Lovely and his friends are heading back to there village, while Pammi and Jaggi are heading to Chandigarh, however at the very last moment she rejects Jaggi and goes back to Lovely.

== Cast ==
- Binnu Dhillon as Lovely ‘Naag’
- Sargun Mehta as Pammi
- Jordan Sandhu as Jaggi
- Karamjit Anmol as Hari
- Shehnaaz Kaur Gill as Taaro
- Harby Sangha as Jeet Barber
- Nirmal Rishi as Nindro Bhua
- Anita Devgan as Lovely's mother
- B.N. Sharma as Jora Singh, Pammi's father
- Gurmeet Saajan as Lovely's father
- Jatinder Kaur as Pammi's grandmother
- Gagneet Singh Makhan as Paal, Pammi's brother
- Ashok Pathak as Dhaba Waiter

== Production ==
Kala Shah Kala was announced after the release of Bailaras and was planned to release in 2018. When Binnu Dhillon was asked about the delaying film he said, "We are working on Kala Shah Kala. The movie is still in its pre-production phase. We are working on a good content oriented script and then we shall work on the rest. This movie got delayed due to the reason that I wanted to learn from my past mistakes." The film was restarted after Infantry Pictures took over the project. Also he said the film is titled after his role as he is playing dark guy complexion role and "Kala Shah Kala" refers to "Purely Black" in Punjabi. Principal photography of the film began on 2 September 2018.

The film is a romedy (romance & comedy) with a social message; Dhillon in an interview said "In our society so much emphasis is put on looks, whether it's a boy or a girl that sometimes we neglect to see what really matters in life. This is the story that a lot of people will relate to, it's a story of an underdog. This is my first association with Zee Studios. It's great to see that mainstream studios see value in Punjabi films now, it's good for the growth of our industry." Mehta added, "Our intent was to make this film in a way that it feels like a warm hug; it's a film that celebrates love and will bring a smile on the audiences’ faces. It will reiterate that love is all about the heart and not about appearances [...]"

=== Casting ===
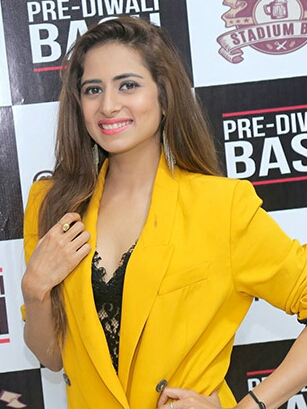
Sargun Mehta (pictured 2017) playing lead actress in Kala Shah Kala.

According to reports, the film was Punjabi debut for the Telugu and Tamil actress Kajal Aggarwal but due to clash in filming schedules she could not join the film. As Sargun Mehta had worked with Infantry Pictures in Jindua, the role was further offered to her who would be playing lead actress for the first time opposite Binnu Dhillon on silver screen.

=== Filming ===
Principal photography of the film was started on 2 September 2018 in Chandigarh where Ravi Kumar Sana served as cinematographer. The director of the film, Amarjit Singh, revealed that it will be a period movie set in rural Punjab depicting the times of 90s and it will be a complete comedy movie promising a wholesome family entertainment. In mahurat shot of the film Binnu Dhillon, Sargun Mehta, Jordan Sandhu, Karamjit Anmol and Bunty Bains were present. Second schedule of the filming took place in December 2018.

== Soundtrack ==
Kala Shah Kala

Soundtrack album by Jatinder Shah, Bunty Bains, Jaggi Singh and Jaidev Kumar
- Released: 10 February 2019
- Recorded: 2019
- Genre: Feature film soundtrack
- Length: 24:57
- Language: Punjabi
- Label: Zee Music Company
External audio
- Audio jukebox on YouTube

The soundtrack is composed by Jatinder Shah, Bunty Bains, Jaggi Singh and Jaidev Kumar on lyrics of Jogi Raikoti, Harmanjit, Bunty Bains, Surinder and Vinder Nathumajra.

Track listing
No.	Title	Lyrics	Music	Singer(s)	Length
1.	"Viah Te Peepniyan"	Jogi Raikoti	Jaggi Singh	Ranjit Bawa, Jaggi Singh & Charanjit Channi	3:22
2.	"Heer Nu Jawani"	Harmanjit	Jaidev Kumar	Navjeet	3:57
3.	"Shaukeen Jatt"	Bunty Bains	Bunty Bains	Jordan Sandhu	3:09
4.	"Jaane Meriye"	Surinder	Jaggi Singh	Jaggi Singh	4:57
5.	"Supna"	Vinder Nathumajra	Jaidev Kumar	Kamal Khan	4:10
6.	"Boliyaan"	Bunty Bains	Bunty Bains	Sonu Kakkar	2:33
7.	"Kala Shah Kala"	Vinder Nathumajra	Jatinder Shah	Jyoti Nooran	2:49
Total length:					24:57

== Release ==
Initially, at the time of announcement of the film in 2017 was planned to be released in 2018 but due to work in development the release date of the film was shifted to 15 March 2019. Later, on 19 October 2018 it was announced that the film would release on 14 February on occasion of Valentine's Day instead of 15 March. Also, on 15 March Band Vaaje which stars Binnu Dhillon and Mandy Takhar in lead roles will release instead of Kala Shah Kala.

The first look poster of the film was released on 14 January 2019. Also, the poster got wide attention, Shariq Patel, CEO, Zee Studios said, "The Punjabi industry is flourishing, and we are happy to bring Kala Shah Kala to the audiences, broadening our presence in the regional markets. It's a heart-warming story with a special social message, I hope the audiences like the film". The film is distributed by Zee Studios internationally including Canada, USA, Australia, Pakistan, UK, Europe, UAE, GCC, and New Zealand. The official teaser of the film was released on 16 January 2019 while some found the teaser "racist" as a child is shown crying after watching a black guy[Lovely]. The official trailer of the film was released on 26 January 2019 at occasion of Republic Day at YouTube. It was viewed over two million times in 24 hours and trended on YouTube. The first song "Viah Te Peepniyan" sung by Ranjit Bawa, Jaggi Singh and Charanjit Channi was released on 1 February 2019 by Zee Music Company.

== Reception ==
As of 24 February 2019, Kala Shah Kala has grossed over ₹8 crore at overseas including ₹1.27 crore at United States, ₹2.91 at Canada, ₹75 lacs at United Kingdom, ₹1.4 crore at Australia, ₹26 lacs at New Zealand and ₹1 crore at Pakistan. In its opening weekend, the film has grossed ₹7.64 crore worldwide including ₹4.1 crore in India and ₹3.54 at overseas.
