= Rupinder Inderjit =

Indian Punjabi film writer

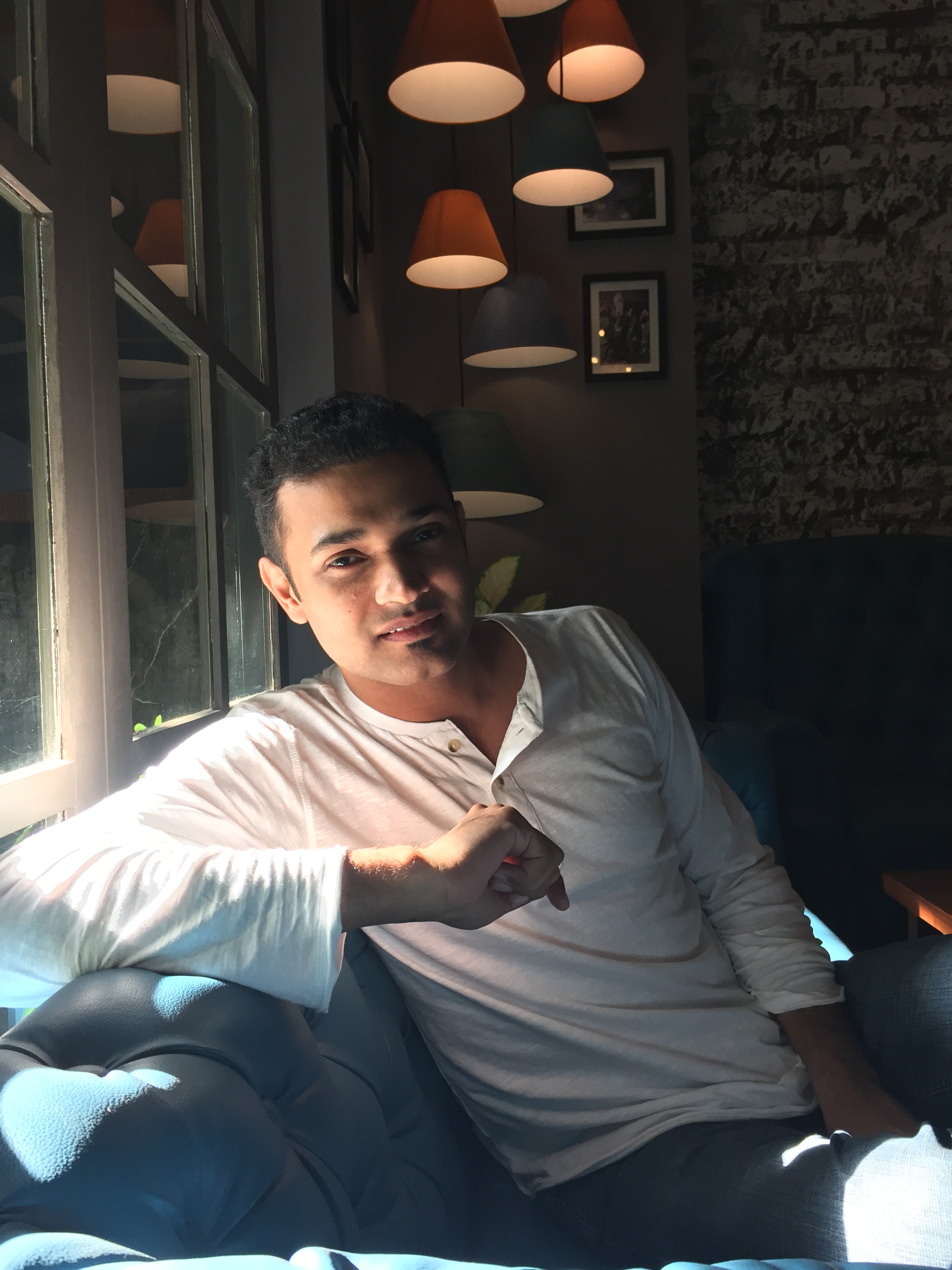
- Rupinder Inderjit
- Born: Rupinder Singh; 7 October; Patiala, Punjab, India
- Occupation: Writer
- Years active: 2014–present

Rupinder Inderjit is a film and television writer. He is best known for writing the screenplay for the 2019 Punjabi film Surkhi Bindi. His directorial debut was with the 2017 short film Khoon Aali Chithi.

== Early life ==
Rupinder Inderjit belongs to village Dholan, Tehsil Jagraon, District Ludhiana, Punjab. He did his schooling from Guru Hargobind Public Senior Secondary School, Sidhwan Khurd. He was very young when he had read Raj Kapoor's published personal diary. He was so inspired that he decided to be a storyteller through films. He loves Punjabi literature especially works of the well known Punjabi poet Shiv Kumar Batalvi. He holds a master's degree from Panjab University, Chandigarh in Anthropology with distinction and a university gold medal. He worked in market research for 6 years before moving on to developing a full-time writing career.

== Filmography ==
Key
†	Denotes films that have not yet been released

Year	Film	Story	Screenplay	Dialogue	Direction
2014	Ishq Brandy	Yes	Yes	Yes	No
2016	Super Singh	No	No	Yes	No
2017	Khoon Aali Chithi (Short)	Yes	Yes	Yes	Yes
2018	Subedar Joginder Singh	No	No	Yes	No
2018	Mar Gaye Oye Loko	No	No	Yes	No
2019	Surkhi Bindi	Yes	Yes	Yes	No
2020	Kaali Khuhi	No	No	Yes	No
2022	Main Viyah Nahi Karona Tere Naal	Yes	Yes	Yes	Yes
2023	Sukhee	No	No	Yes	No
2023	Nigah Marda Ayi Ve	Yes	Yes	Yes	Yes
