= Naved Aslam =

Indian actor, screenwriter

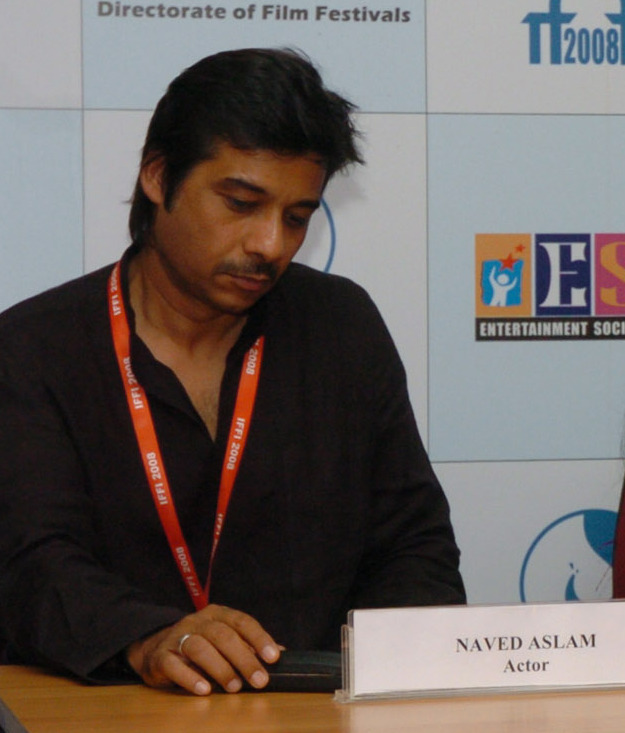
- Naved Aslam at the 39th International Film Festival of India
- Born: Delhi, India
- Occupations: Actor; screenwriter
- Years active: 1993–present
- Relatives: Tyabji family

Naved Aslam is an Indian actor and screenwriter who predominantly works in Hindi television and films. He is best known for his portrayal of Bhishma in the mythological series Suryaputra Karn. In 2018, Aslam made his digital debut with the web series Smoke.

== Early life ==
Aslam moved to Mumbai to pursue his ambition of becoming a director, after a decade in theatre. Initially, he spent over 2 years working on some of the international projects.

== Career ==
Afterwards, Aslam turned actor and made his television acting debut in DD National's Byomkesh Bakshi in 1993. He had another breakthrough in 1996 with Sony TV's medical drama Cover Story Hospital, a 26–part thriller series about a journalist duo discovering the kidney transplant racket rampant in big hospitals and how they unravel the story at a great risk to their lives.

It was aired in 1995-96. Directed by Maya Rao, it featured Naved Aslam, Natasha Rana, and Milind Wagh among others.

Aslam is best known for playing the role of Chand Raichand in the Indian supernatural television series Pyaar Kii Ye Ek Kahaani, where he played a 1000 year old supernatural vampire. Apart from working in television, Aslam has played roles in feature films such as Once Upon a Time in Mumbaai and Honeymoon Travels Pvt. Ltd.

== Filmography ==
=== Television ===
Year	Title	Role	Notes
1989	In Which Annie Gives It Those Ones		Television film
1993	The Young Indiana Jones Chronicles	Theosophy Attendant	
1993–1997	Byomkesh Bakshi	Sukumar / Sitanshu Das / Sanat	
1995–1996	Cover Story Hospital	Vivek	
2006-2009	Ssshhhh... Phir Koi Hai	Lobo	
2010–2011	Pyaar Kii Ye Ek Kahaani	Chand Raichand	
2011–2013	Pavitra Rishta	Digvijay Kirloskar	
2013	Jodha Akbar	Bairam Khan	
2013–2014	Beintehaa	Usman Abdullah	
2015–2016	Suryaputra Karn	Bhishma	
2016	Ishqbaaaz	Vikram Pradeep Rana	
2016	Adaalat	Captain Goyal	
2019	Abhay	Senior Officer	
2021	Matsya Kaand	Sunil Ajmera	
2021	The Empire	Qambar Ali	
2022	Dahan: Raakan Ka Rahasya	Dr. Kaushik Arora	
2022	Ali Baba: Dastaan-E-Kabul	Mustafa	
2025	Search: The Naina Murder Case	DCP Deepak Rathi	
2026	Waiting Hai	DRM	

=== Film ===
Year	Title	Role	Notes
2001	Chhal	Inspector Dave	
2005	Sehar	Inspector Joginder Singh Solanki	
2007	Honeymoon Travels Pvt. Ltd.	Sunil	
2009	Chowrasta Crossroads of Love		
2010	Mr. Singh Mrs. Mehta	Karan Singh	
2010	Once Upon a Time in Mumbaai	Patrick, Sultan's friend and secretary	
2012	Ekhon Nedekha Nodir Xhipare	Sub-Divisional Police Officer Sameer Agarwal	
2019	Upstarts	Veer's uncle	
2026	Mardaani 3	Home Secretary Vijender Sahani	
