= Vicky Dhaliwal =

Indian song-writer

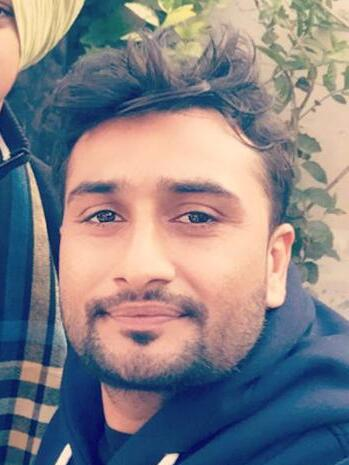
- Dhaliwal in 2020
- Born: Tarandeep Singh Dhaliwal; Rasauli, Punjab, India
- Occupation: Singer lyricist
- Partner: Rupinder Kaur
- Children: Anmoldeep Singh Dhaliwal
- Musical career
- Genres: Bhangra; Pop
- Label: Jass Records

Tarandeep Singh "Vicky" Dhaliwal is an Indian lyricist, singer and former Kabaddi player. He rose to fame after release of "Diamond" by Gurnam Bhullar. Dhaliwal released his debut single "1.5 Lakh", featuring Gurlez Akhtar in 2020.

== Early life ==
Tarandeep Singh Dhaliwal was born into a Jat Sikh family in Rasauli, Patiala district.

== Kabaddi ==
Dhaliwal was the defender in Circle-style Punjabi Kabaddi. He had also played the national level in Kabaddi. He has played for many clubs and academies in his career. He left Kabaddi due to an injury in his shoulder. It took a long time for him to recover from his injury which led him to leave Kabaddi.

== Career ==
Dhaliwal used to write songs even when he played Kabaddi but had not recorded any songs before. In an interview he "listened to the old and classical Punjabi lyricists and poets like Shiv Kumar Batalvi, Bulle Shah, Muhammad Sadiq, Gurdas Mann, Kuldeep Manak and many more. He got inspirations from them to write good. Also, he got some words from them for his songs." As Dhaliwal was born to a middle-class Jat Sikh family, his parents used to criticise his passion as an unrespected profession in society but still supported him. His career also includes 17 years of hard struggle. In 2015-16, his songs like "Rakhli Pyaar Nal", "Joban Rutte" and many more sung by Gurnam Bhullar, Gurjazz, Manjit Sahota, Miss Pooja and Jass Bajwa were successful.

Nowadays, Dhaliwal is known as one of the best Punjabi lyricist. Also, he has written song "Laanedarniye" form the film Kurmaiyan sung by Gurnam Bhullar. However, "Diamond" is believed his most popular song which was also sung by Gurnam Bhullar. The song has been viewed 536 million times on YouTube. Most of songs of Gurnam Bhullar, Gurjazz are penned by Dhaliwal.

He has also been appeared in some song videos penned by him. When he asked about singing, he said, "Definitely, he would launch his own track sung by himself only in future as lyricist doesn't get that popularity and fame that singer get."

== Songs ==
List of singles as lead artist, showing year released and album name
Title	Year	Other artist(s)	Music Producer(s)
"1.5 Lakh"	2020	Gurlez Akhtar	MixSingh

Selected Songs :

- Waake by Gurnam Bhullar
- Sajja Hath by Jass Bajwa
- Jatt Zimindar by Gurnam Bhullar
- Gold Wargi by Jenny Johal
- Laanedarniye by Gurnam Bhullar
- Pakk Thakk by Gurnam Bhullar
- Phone Maar Di by Gurnam Bhullar
- Ohi Boldi by Nisha Bano
- Diamond by Gurnam Bhullar
- Jeeju by Miss Pooja
- Dhakad Yaar by Ajit Singh
- Chobbar by Jass Bajwa
- Deputy by Jass Bajwa
- Mulaqat by Gurnam Bhullar
- Thar Te Baraat by Dilpreet Dhillon
- Laanedar by Gurjazz
- Rakhli Pyar Nal by Gurnam Bhullar
- Winnipeg by Gurnam Bhullar
- Karmawala by Gurnam Bhullar
