= Saunkan Saunkanay 2 =

Indian Punjabi comedy-drama film

- Theatrical release poster
- Directed by: Smeep Kang
- Written by: Amberdeep Singh
- Produced by: Ravi Dubey; Jatin Sethi
- Starring: Ammy Virk; Sargun Mehta; Nimrat Khaira; Nirmal Rishi
- Production companies: Dreamiyata Entertainment, Naad Sstudios
- Release date: 30 May 2025
- Country: India
- Language: Punjabi

Saunkan Saunkanay 2 is a 2025 Indian Punjabi-language comedy-drama film directed by Smeep Kang and written by Amberdeep Singh. It was released theatrically on 30 May 2025 and it is a sequel to the 2022 film Saunkan Saunkne. The film features Ammy Virk, Sargun Mehta, Nimrat Khaira, and Nirmal Rishi reprising their roles. Produced by Ravi Dubey, Jatin Sethi, and others under the banners Dreamiyata Entertainment and Naad Sstudios, the film continues the domestic comedy theme introduced in the original.

== Plot summary ==
Nirmal Singh lives with his two wives Naseeb Kaur and Kiranjit Kaur who are also sisters. The rivalry between the two women creates constant tension at home. Hoping to resolve the situation, Nirmal's mother brings a third woman, Monica Bellucci, into the household. Monica's presence further complicates the family dynamics. As the household adjusts to this unexpected change, misunderstandings and conflicts arise, leading to a series of comedic and chaotic events.

== Cast ==
- Ammy Virk as Nirmal Singh
- Sargun Mehta as:
  - Naseeb Kaur, Nirmal's first wife
  - Monica Bellucci, Nirmal's third wife
- Nimrat Khaira as Kiranjit Kaur, Nirmal's second wife
- Nirmal Rishi as Nirmal's mother
- Karamjit Anmol

== Production ==
The sequel was announced following the commercial performance of Saunkan Saunkne (2022). The film was directed by Smeep Kang, with a screenplay by Amberdeep Singh. Filming took place in Punjab, India beginning in June 2024. It was produced with an estimated budget of ₹10 crore.

== Reception ==
Archika Khurana of Times of India rated 3.5/5, stating "Saunkan Saunkanay 2 doesn't reinvent the wheel, but it keeps it spinning with gusto. Packed with energetic performances, lively music, and enough comedic chaos to keep audiences engaged, it succeeds as a feel-good, mass entertainer."

Sukhpreet Kahlon of Indian Express rated 4/5 and wrote "Despite a few pitfalls, comedy expert Smeep Kang crafts an overall crowd pleasing entertainer starring Sargun Mehta, Ammy Virk and Nimrat Khaira." Mona of The Tribune rated 2.5/5 and stated "The sequel draws laughs and is entertaining. However, the first outing set the bar rather high, and Saunkan Saunkanay 2, even though funny, lacks the emotional heft of its wildly entertaining predecessor."

== Release ==
=== Theatrical ===
The film was released theatrically on 30 May 2025.

=== Home media ===
The digital streaming rights of the film were sold to ZEE5. It premiered on ZEE5 on 25 July 2025.
