= MixSingh =

Indian music composer

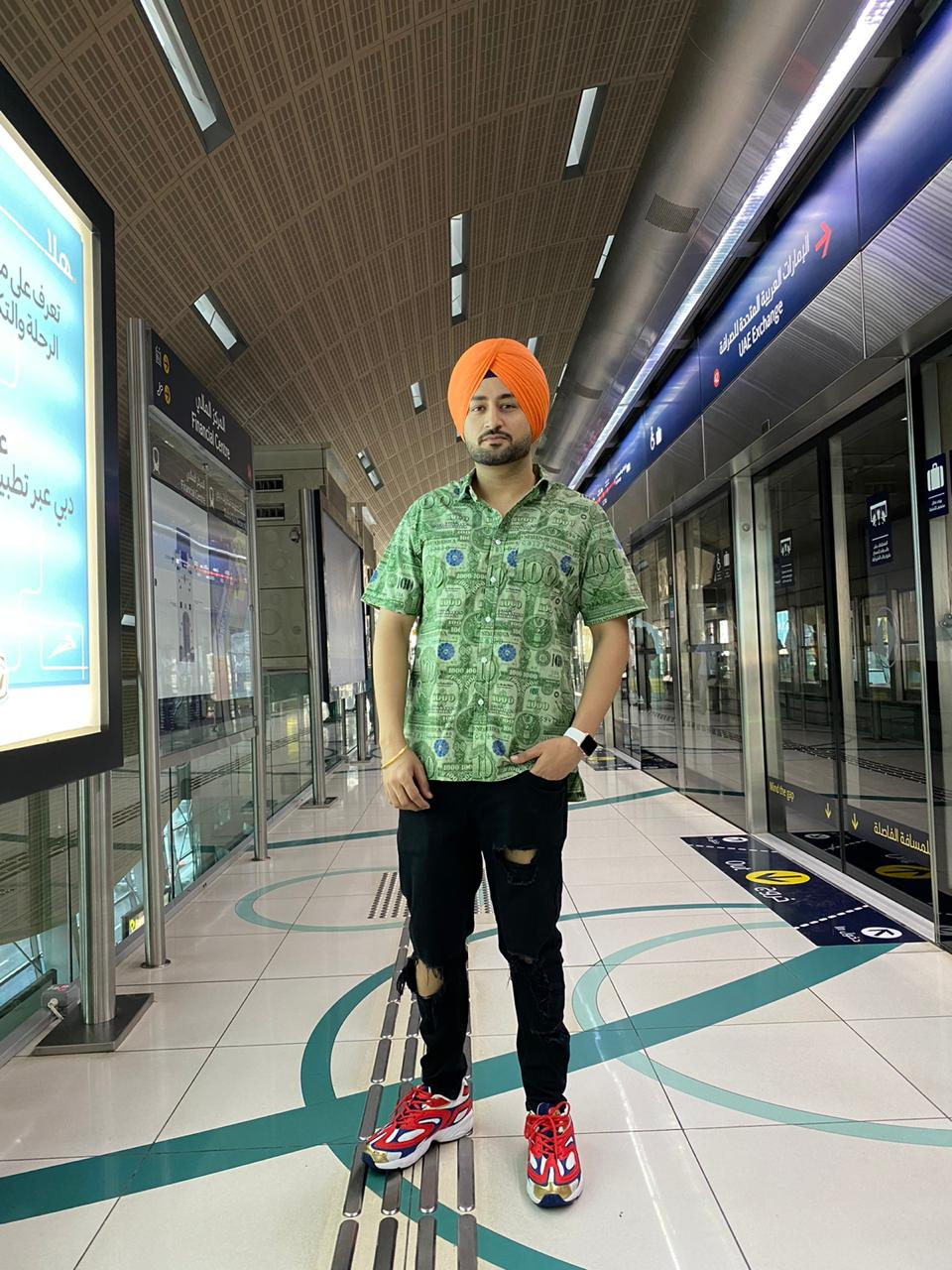
- MixSingh in 2019
- Born: Harmeet Singh; Khanna, Punjab, India
- Occupations: Music composer Music producer
- Years active: 2014-present
- Website: www.mixsingh.com

Harmeet Singh Khanna, popularly known as MixSingh, is an Indian music composer. He is primarily recognized for his compositions in Punjabi music.

He has composed Punjabi songs like "Sakhiyaan" & "Ik Tera" Sung By Maninder Buttar, "Sorry" by Neha Kakkar, "Saara India" by Aastha Gill, "Phone Maar Di" by Gurnam Bhullar, "Tera Mera Viah" & "Shopping" by Jass Manak and "Light Weight" by Kulwinder Billa and Maninder Buttar's debut album Jugni.

He has produced tracks from Diljit Dosanjh's 15th studio album Aura, and the soundtrack to his film, Sardaar Ji 3.

== Selected discography ==
=== Albums as producer ===
Album	Year	Artist	Lyrics	Label
Best	2020	Amar Sandhu	Lopon Sukhdi	MixSingh
Jugni	2021	Maninder Buttar	Maninder Buttar, Babbu	White Hill Music
XL- Xtra Large Album	2021	Simar Doraha	Simar Doraha	Mix Singh
Majaak Thodi Ae	2021	R Nait	R Nait	R Nait

=== Singles ===
Song	Year	Artist(s)	Lyrics	Label
Daang	2018	Mankirt Aulakh	Deep Kahlon	Speed Records
Brotherhood	2018	Mankirt Aulakh, Singga	Singga	Saga Music
Warning Shots	2018	Sidhu Moose Wala	Sidhu Moose Wala	Sidhu Moose Wala
Phone Maar Di	2018	Gurnam Bhullar	Vicky Dhaliwal	Jass Records
By God	2018	Jayy Randhawa, Karan Aujla	Karan Aujla	Tob Gang
Sakhiyan	2018	Maninder Buttar	Babbu	White Hill Music
Who Cares	2018	Maninder Buttar	Maninder Buttar	White Hill Music
Ik Tera	2019	Maninder Buttar	Babbu	White Hill Music
Waake	2019	Gurnam Bhullar	Vicky Dhaliwal	Jass Records
College	2019	Mankirt Aulakh	Singaa	Mankirt Aulakh
21st Century	2019	Mankirt Aulakh, Singaa	Singaa	Mankirt Aulakh
Youth	2019	Mankirt Aulakh, Singaa	Singaa	Mankirt Aulakh
Sorry Song	2019	Maninder Buttar, Neha Kakkar	Babbu	Desi Music Factory
Sone Diyan Walian	2019	Guri	Guri	Geet Mp3
Jamila	2019	Maninder Buttar	Babbu	White Hill Music
Puchda Hi Nahin	2019	Neha Kakkar	Babbu	Desi Music Factory
Kalla Sohna Nahi	2019	Akhil	Babbu	Desi Music Factory
Saara India	2019	Aastha Gill	Nikk	Sony Music India
Shadow	2019	Singaa	Singaa	Lokhdun Punjabi
Light Weight	2019	Kulwinder Billa	Kaptaan	Speed Records
Tut Chali Yaari	2020	Maninder Buttar	Babbu	White Hill Music
Kalla Sohna Nai	2020	Neha Kakkar	Babbu	Desi Music Factory
Shopping	2020	Jass Manak	Jass Manak	Geet MP3
Tera Mera Viah	2020	Jass Manak	Jass Manak	Geet MP3
Viah Ni Karauna	2020	PreetInder	Babbu	Desi Music Factory
Gucci	2020	Aroob Khan	Kaptaan	Desi Music Factory
Tere Karke	2020	Guri	Guri	Geet Mp3
Teri Meri Ladayi	2020	Maninder Buttar, Akasa	Maninder Buttar	Geet Mp3
Yaara Tere Warga	2020	Jass Manak, Sunidhi Chauhan	Jass Manak	Geet Mp3
Raunda Wala	2020	Tarsem Jassar	Tarsem Jassar	Vehli Janta Records
Sangdi Sangdi	2020	Tarsem Jassar, Nimrat Khaira	Tarsem Jassar	Vehli Janta Records
Shadgi	2021	Parmish Verma	Laddi Chahal	Gringo Entertainment
Dilan Deyan Rajeya	2021	Maninder Buttar	Maninder Buttar	White Hill Music
Pani Di Gal	2021	Maninder Buttar	Maninder Buttar	White Hill Music
Mombatiyan	2021	Maninder Buttar	Maninder Buttar	White Hill Music
Kali Kali Kurti	2021	Maninder Buttar	Maninder Buttar	White Hill Music
Jeena Pauni Aa	2021	Maninder Buttar	Maninder Buttar	White Hill Music
Ohle Ohle	2021	Maninder Buttar	Maninder Buttar	White Hill Music
Birthday	2021	Maninder Buttar	Maninder Buttar	White Hill Music
Akadan	2021	Maninder Buttar	Babbu	White Hill Music
Love Me Someday	2021	Maninder Buttar	Babbu	White Hill Music
Khabbi Seat	2021	Ammy Virk	Happy Raikoti	Burfi Music
Tu Shayar Banagi	2021	Parry Sidhu	Parry Sidhu	Mix Singh
Ranjha	2021	Simar Doraha	Simar Doraha	Mix Singh
Bullet	2021	Simar Doraha	Simar Doraha	Mix Singh
Nasha	2021	Simar Doraha	Simar Doraha	Mix Singh
Tenu Chete Karda	2021	Simar Doraha	Simar Doraha	Mix Singh
Sorry	2021	Simar Doraha	Simar Doraha	Mix Singh
Dhilla Jurha	2021	Simar Doraha	Simar Doraha	Mix Singh
Biography	2021	Simar Doraha	Simar Doraha	Mix Singh
XL	2021	Simar Doraha, Gurlez Akhtar	Simar Doraha	Mix Singh
Majak Thodi Ae	2021	R Nait	R Nait	R Nait
Roka	2021	R Nait	R Nait	R Nait
Gundeyan Di Gaddi	2021	R Nait	R Nait	R Nait

== Awards ==
- PTC Punjabi Best Music Director For Single 2018 (Nominated)
- PTC Punjabi Best Sound Recording 2014 (Nominated)
