= Maninder Buttar =

Indian singer-songwriter

- Born: Maninderjeet Singh Buttar Kalanwali, Haryana, India
- Genre: Pop
- Occupations: Singer; songwriter
- Instrument: Vocals
- Years active: 2012–present
- Labels: White Hill Music; Times Music; Speed Records

Maninderjeet Singh Buttar is an Indian singer and songwriter associated with Punjabi music. He is known for his songs "Kite Kalli", "Yaari", "Sakhiyaan", "Ik Tera", "Pani Di Gal" and "Laare".

== Career ==
In 2014, Buttar sang the song "Dil Nu" for the Punjabi romcom Oh My Pyo.

In 2015, his song "Yaari" was nominated for "Most Popular Song" in PTC Punjabi Music Awards.

In 2018, shortly after the release of "Sakhiyaan", the song became the number one song on the Punjabi Most Popular charts compiled by Gaana, and remained there through November 2018, and at number two through December. The song has gathered a total of over 616 million views on YouTube.

In 2019, Spotify included Buttar in the list of the most popular artists in Punjab, along Sidhu Moose Wala and Karan Aujla.

In July 2020, he announced his debut studio album Jugni, and the first track from the album, "Teri Meri Ladayi", was released in August 2020.

== Controversy ==
In October 2026, Uttarakhand cabinet minister Subodh Uniyal alleged that Buttar was beaten up during his concert in the state in 2019 and made further disparaging remarks against him. Buttar stated that he was "hurt" by these claims and demanded the official video of the incident to be released.

== Discography ==
=== Studio albums ===
Year	Title	Albums Details	Ref
2021	Jugni	Tracks : 9; Music : Mix Singh; Lyricist : Maninder Buttar (7), Babbu (2); Co-Singers : Asees Kaur (1), Akasa (1); Label : White Hill Music	

=== Singles ===
Year	Title	Singer	Lyricist	Music	Label
2012	Naaran te sarkaran	Maninder Buttar	Rashmeet	Nick Dhammu	Speed Records
2014	Yaari	Maninder Buttar	Sharry Maan	Sukh-E	Yaar Anmulle Records
2015	Kite Kalli	Maninder Buttar	Happy Raikoti	Preet Hundal	Panj-Aab Records
2016	Viah	Maninder Buttar	Deepa Bandala	Preet Hundal	Speed Records
2017	Gall goriye	Maninder Buttar	Jaani	Raftaar	Zee Music Company
2018	Sakhiyaan	Maninder Buttar	Babbu	Mix Singh	White Hill Music
2018	Ik Ik Pal	Maninder Buttar	Deepa Bandala	Upside Down	White Hill Music
2018	Who Cares	Maninder Buttar	Maninder Buttar	Mix Singh	White Hill Music
2018	Kali Hummer	Maninder Buttar	Happy Raikoti	Deep Jandu	White Hill Music
2019	Jamila	Maninder Buttar	Babbu	Mix Singh	White Hill Music
2019	Ik Tera	Maninder Buttar	Maninder Buttar	Mix Singh	White Hill Music
2019	Laare	Maninder Buttar	Jaani	B Praak	White Hill Music
2020	Shopping	Maninder Buttar	Maninder Buttar	Mix Singh	White Hill Music
2020	Tod Da-e-dil	Ammy Virk	Maninder Buttar	Avvy Sra	Desi Melodies
2020	Teri Meri Ladayi ( From album "Jugni")	Maninder Buttar, Akasa	Maninder Buttar	Mix Singh	White Hill Music
2020	Tutt Chali Yaari	Maninder Buttar	Babbu	Mix Singh	White Hill Music
2021	Dilaan De Rajea	Maninder Buttar	Maninder Buttar	Mix Singh	White Hill Music
2021	Pani Di Gal (From album "Jugni")	Maninder Buttar, Asees Kaur	Maninder Buttar	Mix Singh	White Hill Music
2021	Mombatiyaan (From album "Jugni")	Maninder Buttar		Mix Singh	White Hill Music
2021	Kol Hove	Maninder Buttar		Archiez	White Hill Music
2021	Kde Kde	Maninder Buttar		Gaurav Dev & Kartik Dev	Speed Records
2023	About You	Maninder Buttar, Jumana	Karan Thabal	Jay B	Maninder Buttar
2024	Main Hawa Mein Hu	Maninder Buttar, Emiway Bantai	Maninder Buttar, Emiway Bantai	Tony James	Maninder Buttar
2025	Aavo Ni Saiyoon	Maninder Buttar, Happy Raikoti	Maninder Buttar, Happy Raikoti	Maninder Buttar, Happy Raikoti, Suyash	T-Series

=== Songs in movies ===
Year	Movie	Title	Music	Lyricist	Notes
2014	Oh My Pyo Ji	Dil Nu	DJ Flow	Happy Raikoti	
2019	Laiye Je Yaarian	Dil Main Ni Launa	Mix Singh	Maninder Buttar	
2021	Bell Bottom	Sakhiyan 2.0	Tanishk Bagchi; Maninder Buttar	Babbu; Tanishk Bagchi; Maninder Buttar	Remake of his Single Sakhiyan; Bollywood Debut; With Zarah Khan
