= Jhalle =

2019 Punjabi language dark comedy film

- Directed by: Amarjit Singh Saron
- Screenplay by: Amarjit Singh Saron
- Story by: Amarjit Singh Saron
- Produced by: Binnu Dhillon; Sargun Mehta; Ravi Dubey; Manish Walia
- Starring: Binnu Dhillon; Sargun Mehta
- Cinematography: Ravi Kumar Sana
- Edited by: Rohit Dhiman
- Music by: Kevin Roy
- Production companies: Binnu Dhillon Production; Dreamiyata Entertainment Pvt Ltd; Manish Walia Production
- Distributed by: Omjee; Star Studios Navroz Gurbaaz Entertainment Ltd
- Release date: 15 November 2019
- Country: India
- Language: Punjabi

Jhalle (transl. Crazy) is a 2019 Indian Punjabi-language dark comedy film written and directed by Amarjit Singh Saron. The film is produced by Binnu Dhillon, Sargun Mehta and Manish Walia, under their respective banners Binnu Dhillon Production, Dreamiyata Entertainment and Manish Walia Production. It stars Dhillon and Mehta in lead roles. The filming began on 21 July 2019. It was released on 15 November 2019.

== Cast ==
- Binnu Dhillon
- Sargun Mehta
- Pavan Malhotra
- Harby Sangha
- Honey Jalaf
- Jatinder Kaur
- Banninder Bunny
- Gurinder Dimmpy

== Production ==
The film was announced on 9 July 2019, with Binnu Dhillon and Sargun Mehta in lead roles. The film to be directed by Amarjit Singh and bankrolled by Binnu Dhillon, Sargun Mehta and Manish Walia.

== Release ==
It was scheduled to be theatrically released on 11 October 2019, but date was pushed to 15 November.

== Soundtrack ==
Jhalley

Soundtrack album by Diamondstar Worldwide
- Recorded: 2019
- Genre: Feature film soundtrack
- Language: Punjabi
- Label: Speed Records

The songs for the film are composed by Diamondstar Worldwide and lyrics by Gurnam Bhullar and Garry Vinder.

Track list
No.	Title	Singer(s)	Length
1.	"Jhalle (Title Track)"	Gurnam Bhullar	3:12
2.	"Pagalpan"	Gurnam Bhullar	3:42
3.	"Kuch Bol Ve"	Afsana Khan	3:24
4.	"Laat Wargi"	Ammy Virk	2:06
