= Gurnam Bhullar =

Indian singer, lyricist and actor

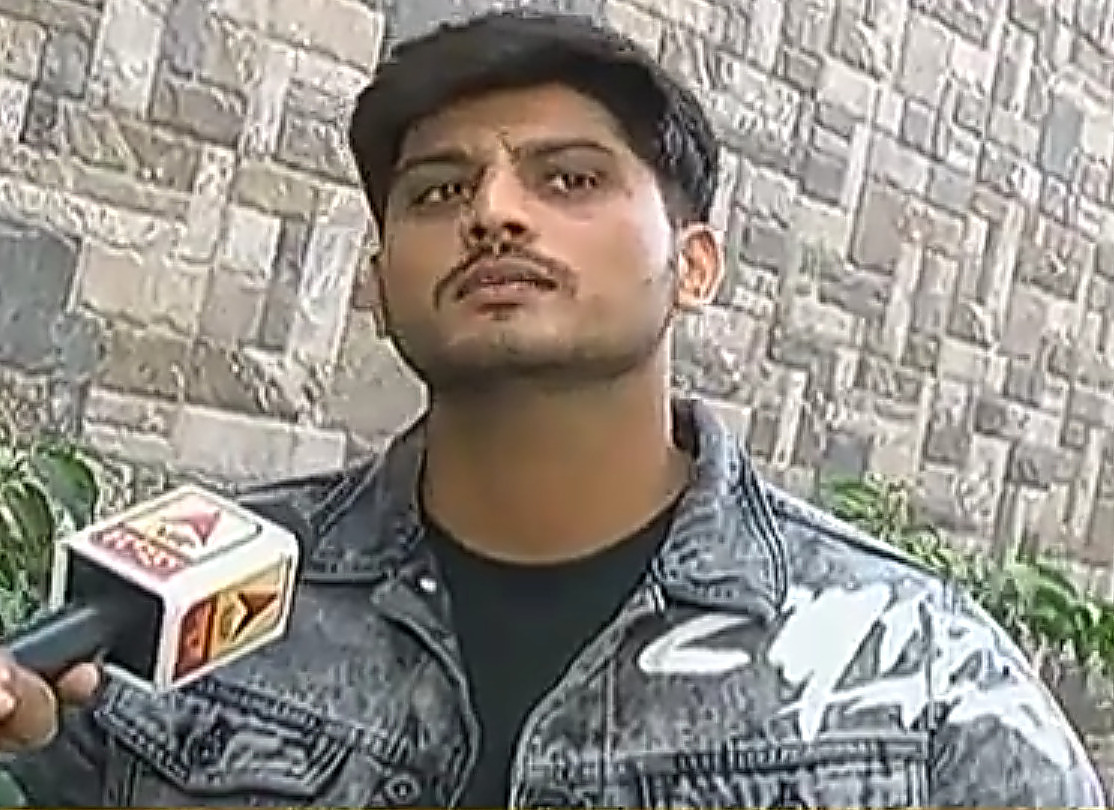

Background information
- Born: 8 February 1994 (age 32); Kamal Wala, Fazilka district, Punjab, India
- Genres: Pop and folk
- Occupations: Singer; actor; lyricist
- Instrument: Vocals
- Years active: (2015 –present)
- Labels: Jass Records; White Hill Music; Diamondstar Worldwide, Desi Junction, Speed Records
- Spouse: Balpreet Kaur (m. 2023)

Gurnam Bhullar (born 8 February 1994) is an Indian singer, actor and lyricist associated with Punjabi language music and films. He is best known for his single "Diamond" released in 2018. He made his debut in the 2019 film Guddiyan Patole.

== Personal life ==
Bhullar was born on 8 February 1994 in Kamal Wala village of Fazilka district. He resides in Chandigarh. Bhullar married Balpreet Kaur, a doctor, in November 2023.

== Career ==
=== Singing ===
Gurnam Bhullar won Awaz Punjab Di Season 5. He has also participated in Sa Re Ga Ma Pa, and Voice of Punjab.

=== Acting ===
On 8 March 2019, Gurnam Bhullar released his debut film Guddiyan Patole.

== Discography ==
=== Albums ===
Year	Title	Lyrics	Music	Label
2020	Dead End	Gill Raunta	Laddi Gill	Jass Records
2022	Majestic Laane	Kaptaan, Jassi Lohka	Desi Crew, Gur Sidhu	Desi Junction
2023	Imagination	Gurnam Bhllar, Vicky Dhaliwal	Mxrci, Desi Crew	

=== Singles ===
Year	Title	Lyrics	Music	Label	Notes
2014	Heer Jehiya Kudian	Gurnam Bhullar	The Ambient Studio	Yaar Anmule Records	
2016	Rakhli Pyaar Naal	Vicky Dhaliwal	Mix Singh	Jass Records	
2016	Shanivaar	Matt Sheron	Gagz Studio	Jass Records	
2016	Winnipeg	Mintu Samra	Desi Routz	Jass Records	
2016	Sahan Ton Pyaareya	Gurnam Bhullar	Rupin Kahlon	Trendz Music	
2017	Sade Aale	Gill Raunta	Mix Singh	Jass Records	
2017	Goriyan Naal Gerhe	Gill Raunta	Mix Singh	Jass Records	
2017	Kismat Vich Machinaan De	Mintu Samra	Music Empire	Jass Records	
2017	Balle		Kickz Masters	Manan Music	
2017	Jinna Tera Main Kardi	Garry Vandar	Mix Singh	Jass Records	
2017	Pahunch	Vicky Dhaliwal	KV Singh	Jass Records	
2017	Drivery	Aman Bilaspuria	Music Empire	Jass Records	Duet with Deepak Dhillon
2018	Ankh	Mintu Smara	Kicz Masterz	Hey Yolo	
2018	Diamond	Vicky Dhaliwal	Ikwinder Singh (Ikky)	Jass Records	Breakthrough Song, 600 M+ Views On YouTube
2018	Gora Rang	Vicky Dhaliwal	Rupin Kahlon	White Hill Music	
2018	Phone Maar Di	Vicky Dhaliwal	Mix Singh	Jass Records	
2018	Pakk Thakk	Gill Raunta	Mix Singh	Jass Records	
2018	Jatt Zimindar	Vicky Dhaliwal	Desi Crew	Jass Records	
2019	P.K	Gill Raunta	PBN	Jass Records	
2019	Wakke	Vicky Dhaliwal	Mix Singh	Jass Records	
2019	Kharche (Drivery 2)	Dalvir Bhullar	Music Empire	Jass Records	With Shipra Goyal
2019	I Don't Quit	Gurnam Bhullar	Mix Singh	Jass Records	
2019	Pagal	Singhjeet	G Guri	Jass Records	
2020	Jhanjran	Vicky Dhaliwal	Preet Hundal	Jass Records	
2020	Peg Vi Yaaran	Gill Raunta	Laddi Gill	Jass Records	From Album "Dead End"
2020	Trust Me	Preet Judge	Preet Hundal	Jass Records	
2020	Lime Light	Gill Raunta	Mix Singh	Jass Records	
2020	Qaatal Akhan	Mintu Samra	Mix Singh	Jass Records	
2020	Jatt	Vicky Dhaliwal	Vikrant Grooves	Daimond Star Worldwide	
2020	Jaan	Happy Raikoti	Sharry Nexus	Jass Records	
2021	Singh	Maati Cheema	Daoud	Daimond Star Worldwide	Religious Song
2021	Pasand Bangi	Rony Ajnali & Gill Machrai	Desi Crew	Jass Records	With Gurlez Akhtar
2021	Agg Att Koka Kehar	Kaptaan	Gur Sidhu	Desi Junction	With Baani Sandhu
2021	Roka	Gurnaam Bhullar	Sharry Nexus	Times Music	
2021	Mera Haal	Kavvy Riyaz	Rox A	Jass Records	
2021	Udaariyaan	Gurnam Bhullar	V Raxx	Diamondstar Worldwide	From TV serial "Udaariyaan"
2021	Masla	Vicky Dhaliwal	Desi Crew	White Hill Music	
2021	Swargan Da Jhoota	Gurnam Bhullar	Mix Singh	Daimondstar Worldwide	
2021	Tohr	Gurnam Bhullar	V Raxx	Daimondstar Worldwide	
2021	Jija Saali	Gill Raunta	Laddi Gill	Daimondstar Worldwide	With Deepak Dhillon
2021	Mithi Mithi	Mandeep Maavi	Desi Crew	MN Melody	With Mannat Noor
2022	Kul Milaake Jatt	Kaptaan	Desi Crew	Desi Junction	From Album Majestic Laane
2022	Diamond Koka	Jassi Lohka	Gur Sidhu	Desi Junction	From Album Majestic Laane
2022	90 Degrees	Kaptaan	Desi Crew	Desi Junction	From Album Majestic Laane
2023	Wang Tut Gayi	Vicky Dhaliwal	Desi Crew	Diamondstar Worldwide	With Mannat Noor

=== Film songs ===
Year	Film	Song	Lyrics	Music
2018	Kurmayian	Lanedarniye	Vicky Dhaliwal	Mix Singh
2018	Qismat	Fakira	Jaani	B Praak
2018	Afsar	Udhar Chalda	Arjan Dhillon	Preet Hundal
2019	Guddiyan Patole	Guddiyan Patole	Gurnam Bhullar	V Raxx
2019	Guddiyan Patole	Lakk De Hulare	Garry Vander	Sukh-E
2019	Guddiyan Patole	Mohabbat	Harinder Kaur	V Raxx
2019	Guddiyan Patole	Maaye Ni	Harinder Kaur	V Raxx
2019	Guddiyan Patole	Ishq Diyan Shuruatan	Gurnam Bhullar	V Raxx
2019	Surkhi Bindi	Duniya	Gurnam Bhullar	Kick masterz
2019	Surkhi Bindi	Surkhi Bindi	Gurnam Bhullar	V Raxx
2019	Surkhi Bindi	Pariyan	Deep Bekha	V Raxx
2019	Surkhi Bindi	Ganna Te Gurh	Gill Raunta	Laddi Gill
2019	Surkhi Bindi	Karmawala	Vicky Dhaliwal	V Raxx
2019	Surkhi Bindi	Demanda	Vicky Dhaliwal	V Raxx
2019	Jhalle	Jhalle	Gurnam Bhullar	Laddi Gill
2019	Jhalle	Pagalpan	Gurnam Bhullar	Diamond star
2021	Fufad Ji	Gal Ban Jau	Gurnam Bhullar	Daoud music
2021	Fufad Ji	Appa Dowien	Gurnam Bhullar	Daoud music
2021	Fufad Ji	Dil Diyan Gallan	Gurnam Bhullar	Daoud music
2021	Fufad Ji	Fufad Ji	Gurnam Bhullar	Daoud music
2021	Fufad Ji	Beganean De Wang	Gurnam Bhullar	Daoud music
2022	Main Viyah Nahi Karona Tere Naal	Main Viyah Nahi Karona Tere Naal	Gurnam Bhullar	Laddi Gill
2022	Main Viyah Nahi Karona Tere Naal	Wakh Ho Jana	Gurnam Bhullar	Daddy Beats
2022	Main Viyah Nahi Karona Tere Naal	Jinna Jinna	Gurnam Bhullar	Daddy Beats
2022	Main Viyah Nahi Karona Tere Naal	Tareyan To Paar	Gurnam Bhullar	Daoud Music
2022	Main Viyah Nahi Karona Tere Naal	Hasda Disda Rahin (Sung by Mohini Toor)	Gurnam Bhullar	Daoud Music
2022	Lekh	Mera Yaar	Jaani	B Praak
2022	Lekh	Beliya	Jaani	B Praak
2022	Kokka	Mere Peera	Dakshh Ajit Singh	Sandeep Saxena
2022	Kokka	Sohna Koi Nahi	Raj Ranjodh	Raj Ranjodh
2022	Sohreyan Da Pind Aa Gaya	Ghund Kadh Le Ni Sohreyan Da Pind Aa Gaya Title Track	Gurnam Bhullar	Laddi Gill
2022	Sohreyan Da Pind Aa Gaya	Jaan War Daa	Gurnam Bhullar	Daoud Music
2022	Sohreyan Da Pind Aa Gaya	Mishri Di Dali	Gurnam Bhullar	V Rakx Music
2022	Sohreyan Da Pind Aa Gaya	Saheli	Gurnam Bhullar	Chet Singh
2022	Sohreyan Da Pind Aa Gaya	Dil Rukda	Gurnam Bhullar	Daoud Music
2022	Jind Mahi	Rabba Mainu	Farmaan	Oye Kunaal
2022	Jind Mahi	Shiddat	Youngveer	Goldboy
2023	Nigah Marda Ayi Ve	Mallo Malli	Gurnam Bhullar	Gaurav Dev, Kartik Dev
2023	Nigah Marda Ayi Ve	Rog Mera Yaar	Gurnam Bhullar	Daddy Beats
2023	Nigah Marda Ayi Ve	Koke Vich Dil	Gurnam Bhullar	Desi Crew
2023	Nigah Marda Ayi Ve	Ik Pardesi (Sung by Hashmat Sultana)	Gurnam Bhullar	Gaurav Dev, Kartik Dev
2023	Nigah Marda Ayi Ve	Nigah Marda Ayi Ve Title Track	Gurnam Bhullar	Gaurav Dev, Kartik Dev
2023	Nigah Marda Ayi Ve	Chunni De Palle	Gurnam Bhullar	Daoud Music

== Filmography ==
Key
†	Denotes films that have not yet been released

Year	Film	Role	Notes
2018	Afsar	Singer	Special appearance in song "Udhaar Chalda"
2019	High End Yaariyaan	Bajwa	Supporting Role
2019	Guddiyan Patole	Amreek Singh	Debut film as Lead
2019	Surkhi Bindi	Sukha	With Sargun Mehta 2019 Rose rosy te gulab
2021	Fufad Ji	Chann	ZEE5 Release
2022	Main Vyah Ni Karona Tere Naal	Pooran	With Sonam Bajwa
2022	Lekh	Rajveer	With Tania
2022	Kokka	Akal	With Neeru Bajwa
2022	Sohreyan Da Pind Aa Gaya	Raja	With Sargun Mehta
2022	Jind Mahi	Pinder Maan	Guest Appearance
2023	Nigah Marda Ayi Ve	Harman	With Sargun Mehta
2024	Rose Rosy Te Gulab	Gulab	With Mahi Sharma
2024	Khadari	Guru	Lead role with Surbhi Jyoti
2026	Ishqa'n De Lekhe	Samar Randhawa	With Isha Malviya
