= Nikka Zaildar 3 =

2019 Punjabi romantic comedy film

- Theatrical release poster
- Directed by: Simerjit Singh
- Screenplay by: Jagdeep Sidhu; Gurpreet Singh Palheri
- Produced by: Amneet Sher Singh; Ramneet Sher Singh
- Starring: Ammy Virk; Wamiqa Gabbi; Sonia Kaur; Nirmal Rishi
- Cinematography: Akashdeep Pandey
- Edited by: Bunty Nagi
- Music by: Jatinder Shah
- Production companies: Viacom18 Studios; Patiala Motion Pictures
- Release date: 20 September 2019
- Running time: 121 minutes
- Country: India
- Language: Punjabi
- Budget: 7.50 crore
- Box office: ₹17.95 crore

Nikka Zaildar 3 is a 2019 Indian Punjabi-language romantic-comedy film directed by Simerjit Singh from a screenplay co-written by Jagdeep Sidhu and Gurpreet Singh Palheri. The film is third instalment of Nikka Zaildar film series. Co-produced by Viacom18 Studios and Patiala Motion Pictures, it stars Ammy Virk, Wamiqa Gabbi, Sonia Kour, and Nirmal Rishi in lead roles. The film chronicles the story of Nikka whose father's soul enters his body following his death. It also stars Sardar Sohi, Hardeep Gill, Baninder Bunny, Gurmeet Saajan, and Jagdeep Randhawa in supporting roles. The film was released on 20 September 2019. The film received negative reviews from critics.

== Plot ==
Nikka, a young man studying in a college in Patiala Punjab, falls in love with a fellow student, Manraj, and decides to pursue her. His difficult home situation does not make this easy as his Grandfather is very cheap and does not like educated daughter-in-laws, or spending money. After his grandfather passes away, his grandmother takes over being cheap.

One day Nikka drinks his grandfather's secret alcohol and pretends to be drunk so he can abuse everyone.

The next day everyone thinks the spirit of his grandfather has entered him and took him to a witch doctor to have it removed

The witch doctor suspects something so talks to him in private and Nikka admits he is faking do he can enjoy life. The witch doctor agrees to help and tells his family they have to do everything Nikka says.

== Cast ==
- Ammy Virk as Nikka Zaildar
- Wamiqa Gabbi as Palpreet
- Sonia Kaur as Dimple
- Nirmal Rishi as Bebe
- Sardar Sohi as Visaakha Zaildar
- Gurpreet Bhangu as Nikka's Bhuwa
- Gurmeet Saajan
- Jagdeep Randhawa
- Hardeep Gill
- Baninderjit Singh Bunny
- Nisha Bano as Shanti
- Parminder Gill as Mother

== Soundtrack ==
Nikka Zaildar 3

Soundtrack album by Gurmeet Singh, Rick Hrt and Kunwar Brar
- Released: 23 September 2019
- Recorded: 2019
- Genre: Feature film soundtrack
- Length: 12:37
- Language: Punjabi
- Label: Zee Music Company
External audio
- Audio song on YouTube

Soundtrack of the film is composed by Gurmeet Singh, Rick Hrt & Kuwar Brar while the background score is composed by Jatinder Shah. Lyrics are by Kaptaan, Simer Doraha and Happy Raikoti.

Track listing
No.	Title	Lyrics	Music	Singer(s)	Length
1.	"Announcement"	Kaptaan	Gurmeet Singh	Ammy Virk	2:21
2.	"Subaah"	Kaptaan	Rick HRT	Ammy Virk	3:01
3.	"Film Banaun Nu Firaan"	Simer Doraha	Gurmeet Singh	Ammy Virk	2:42
4.	"Do Naina Diyan Rufflan"	Kaptaan	Kunwar Brar	Nachattar Gill	2:04
5.	"Dharti Te"	Happy Raikoti	Gurmeet Singh	Ammy Virk	2:29
Total length:					12:37

== Production ==
Principal photography of the film took place in different schedules, it began on 2 February 2019, and last schedule took place in August 2019 with Akashdeep Pandey serving as a cinematographer.

== Release and marketing ==
The film was announced in September 2018 with a cartoonized poster. The film was originally scheduled to be released on 21 June 2019 but was postponed to 20 September 2019. The film was released on 350 screens in Punjab. First look poster of the film was released on 16 August 2019. Official trailer of the film was released on 2 September 2019.

== Scoops ==
=== Nirmal Rishi's character ===
Jagdeep Sidhu revealed that his great-grandmother was the original Dilip Kaur (Nirmal Rishi), and she inspired the Nikka Zaildar character Dilip Kaur.

== Reception ==
=== Box office ===
Nikka Zaildar 3 grossed ₹1.3 crore nett on its opening day, making it second-highest nett grossing Punjabi film on opening day of the year after Shadaa (₹2.3 crore nett). Also, the film had better opening than all other new Hindi releases. The film grossed ₹9.45 crore in its opening weekend worldwide, making it one of the highest opening Punjabi films. As of 4 October 2019 the film has grossed ₹16.2 Crore Worldwide. As of 11 October 2019 the film has grossed 22.4 crore worldwide.

=== Critical response ===
Gurnaaz Kaur of The Tribune gave two and a half star out of five and described the film as "laugh riot". Kaur called the story "senseless" but praised the message embedded in it for superstitions. She praised the performances of Ammy Virk, Wamiqa Gabbi, Sonia, Nirmal Rishi and Sardar Sohi. Also, she praised the music, sound and the direction by Simerjit Singh.
