= Boogie Woogie Kids Championship =

Indian dance competition television series

- Created by: Javed Jaffrey; Ravi Behl; Naved Jaffrey
- Country of origin: India
- Original language: Hindi

Production
- Running time: approx. 60 minutes
- Production company: R&N TV Productions

Original release
- Network: Sony Entertainment Television
- Release: 7 December 2013 – 30 March 2014

Boogie Woogie Kids Championship is an Indian dance competition television series created and directed by Javed Jaffrey and Ravi Behl, owners of R&N TV Productions, for Sony Entertainment Television. Javed Jaffrey, Naved Jafri, and Ravi Behl are the permanent judges on the show.

The series began broadcast of 7 December 2013.

== Hosts ==
- Sargun Mehta
- Rakshit Wahi

== Judges ==
- Javed Jaffrey
- Naved Jaffrey
- Ravi Behl

== Finalists ==
Abhishek Sinha won the finale. Apart from Abhishek, Aryan Patra, Sachin Sharma, Priyanka Tapaddar and Mohd Mumtaz were the finalists.

== Reception ==
Throughout the globe, Boogie Woogie Kids Championship received mostly positive critical reception.
