= Lip Sing Battle =

- Genre: Reality competition
- Created by: NA
- Based on: Lip Sync Battle
- Presented by: Farah Khan; Ali Asgar
- Country of origin: India
- No. of seasons: 1
- No. of episodes: 16

Production
- Running time: 45 min approx
- Production company: Red Pepper Pictures

Original release
- Network: STAR Plus
- Release: 16 September – 5 November 2017

Lip Sing Battle is an Indian musical reality competition television series produced by South Africa's Red Pepper TV which premiered on 16 September 2017, on Star Plus and continued till 5 November 2017. The show is based on Lip Sync Battle. The show was hosted by Farah Khan and Ali Asgar.

== Concept ==
Celebrities compete against one another to perform the best lip sync with the help of props and costumes.

== See also ==
- Lip Sync Battle
