= Nisha Bano =

Indian actress and singer

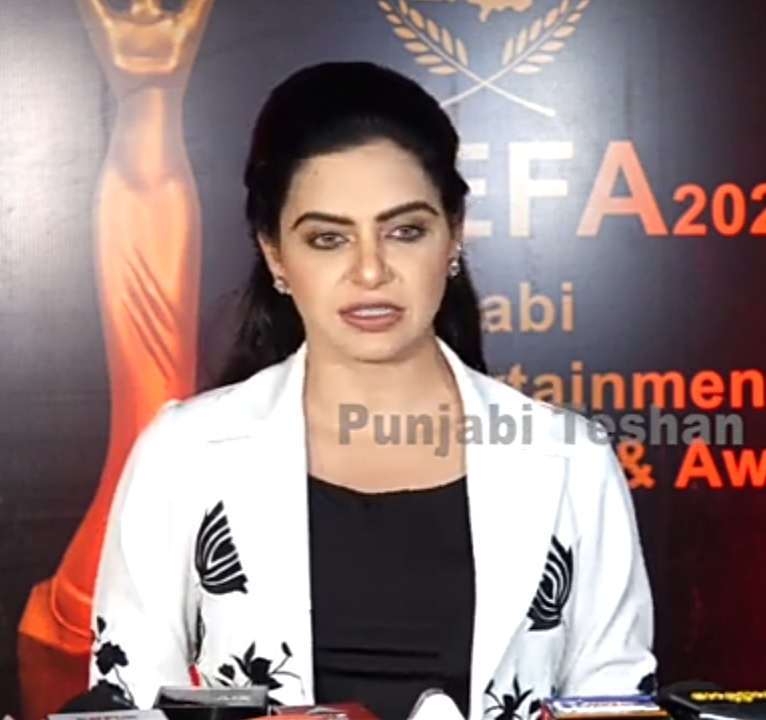
- Bano in 2024
- Born: Mansa, Punjab, India
- Occupations: Actress, singer
- Spouse: Sameer Mahi

Nisha Bano is an Indian actress and singer who works in the Punjabi entertainment industry. She started her Punjabi film career with Jatt Airways and her Hindi film debut with Amar Singh Chamkila.

== Early career ==
Bano was born in Mansa, Punjab, India. She completed her schooling at Yogesh Memorial public school in Mansa, Punjab. She was very active in art & cultural activities during her school days. She has completed her graduation from SD College, Mansa. She has won many prizes in Giddha during college youth festivals. She first appeared in Punjabi television series with Bhagwant Mann. Meanwhile, Bano has worked along with Binnu Dhillon and Karamjit Anmol on various stages all around the world.

== Career ==
=== Acting career ===
Nisha Bano started her acting through a TV Show named Hasde Hasande Ravo telecasted on Channel MH1. Later, she began her film journey from the movie Jatt and Juliet. She has played roles in Punjabi movies like Jatt Airways, Bhaji in Problem, Jatt Boys – Putt Jattan De, Angrej, Fer Mamla Gadbad Gadbad, Bazz, Teshan, Nikka Zaildar, Manje Bistre, Puaada and many more. She started her Bollywood career with the Imtiaz Ali film Amar Singh Chamkila in 2024.

=== Singing career ===
Apart from acting, Nisha Bano is famous for duet singing with Karamjit Anmol. She sung various Punjabi songs as Playback Singer for Punjabi Movies, such as "Morni", "Mai Chadta", "Mere Wala Jatt".

== Filmography ==
=== Films ===
Key
†	Denotes films that have not yet been released

Year	Title	Role	Notes
2012	Jatt & Juliet		Guest appearance
2013	Jatt Airways	Bijli	Debut Film
2013	Bhaji in Problem		
2013	Jatt Boys Putt Jatt De	Baani	
2015	Angrej	Golo Maado's friend	
2016	Teshan		
2016	Nikka Zaildar	Shanti	
2017	Dangar Doctor Jelly	Laajo	
2018	Laavan Phere	Satti	
2018	Carry on Jatta 2	Sharan	
2018	Aate Di Chidi		
2018	Laatu	Maano	
2018	Marriage Palace	Jeeti	
2018	Yaar Belly		
2019	Do Dooni Panj	Jagga's sister	
2019	Surkhi Bindi	Deepi	
2019	Nikka Zaildar 3	Shanti	
2021	Puaada	Jaggi's sister	
2021	Shava Ni Girdhari Lal	Kuljeet's sister	
2022	Ni Main Sass Kuttni		
2022	Yich Bolunga Tere		
2022	Tere Layi		
2023	Ji Wife Ji	Kiran	
2023	Pyar Hai Darma (PHD)		
2023	Nigah Marda Ayi Ve	Jessica Sandhu	
2023	Ki Main Jhooth Boleya???		
2024	Amar Singh Chamkila	Sonia	Debut Hindi Film
2026	Jihne Mera Ghar Patteya	Rajjo	Punjabi Movie
