= Gurmeet Saajan =

Indian film and television actor (born 1961)

Gurmeet Saajan ਗੁਰਮੀਤ ਸਾਜਨ
- Born: 1 November 1961 (age 64); Village Lande (Moga district), Punjab
- Occupation(s): Actor, singer, goldsmith
- Years active: 1991–present
- Website: official FB

Gurmeet Saajan (Punjabi: ਗੁਰਮੀਤ ਸਾਜਨ) is an Indian film and television actor who works in Indian cinema. He started his career as a singer, did few Punjabi short movies and television soap operas in the earlier days and ended up appearing in the films. He is most remembered for his role as Fuffad in 2015 Punjabi movie Angrej.

== Filmography ==
Year	Film	Role	Special Notes
1991	Udeekan Saun Diyan		
1992	Dharam Jatt Da		
1992	Qaidan Umran Diyan		
1995	Bagawat	Thanedaar Natha Singh	
1995	Dhee Jatt Di		
1996	Pachtawa		
1996	Zaildaar	Shamsher	
1999	Vastav		
2004	Des Hoya Pardes		
2012	Tere Naal Love Ho Gaya	Chaudhari's brother	Hindi Movie
2015	Angrej	Angrej's Fuffad	
2016	Nikka Zaildar	Manraaj's Taaya	
2016	Love Punjab	Village Scientist	
2016	Kaptaan		
2016	Motor mitraan di		
2017	Saab Bahadar	Bachittar Singh- Informer	
2017	Sarvann	Paali's father	
2017	Rabb Da Radio	Kabul Singh (Naseeb's father in law)	
2017	Toofan Singh	Gurmel Singh	
2017	Nikka Zaildar 2	Saudaagar Chharha	
2017	Vekh Baraatan Challiyan	Jaggi's uncle	
2017	Dangar Doctor Jelly	Chamkila	
2017	Sat Shri Akaal England		
2018	Daana Paani	Fauji Bheem Singh	
2018	Yamla Pagla Deewana: Phir Se	Taaya	Hindi Movie
2018	Kurmaiyan		Actor, director, producer
2019	Kaka G		Punjabi Movie
2019	Munda Faridkotia		Punjabi Movie
2019	Tu Mera Ki Lagda		Punjabi Movie

== Telefilms ==
- Ghala Mala (2006)
- Ghala Mala 2 (2008)
- Maa Da Dharminder
- Taragi Wala Baba
- Amli Punjab De (2016)
- Ullu De Pathe
- Hun Kar Gall (Ghala Mala 5)
- Adhoora Sawaal (2017)

== Television serials ==
- Do Akal Garh
- Kissa Puran Bhagat
- Apni Mitti
- Professor Moneyplant

== Music albums ==
- Nachna Vi Manjoor
- Oh Din Parat Nahi Aune
