= Jatinder Mauhar =

Indian film director and scriptwriter

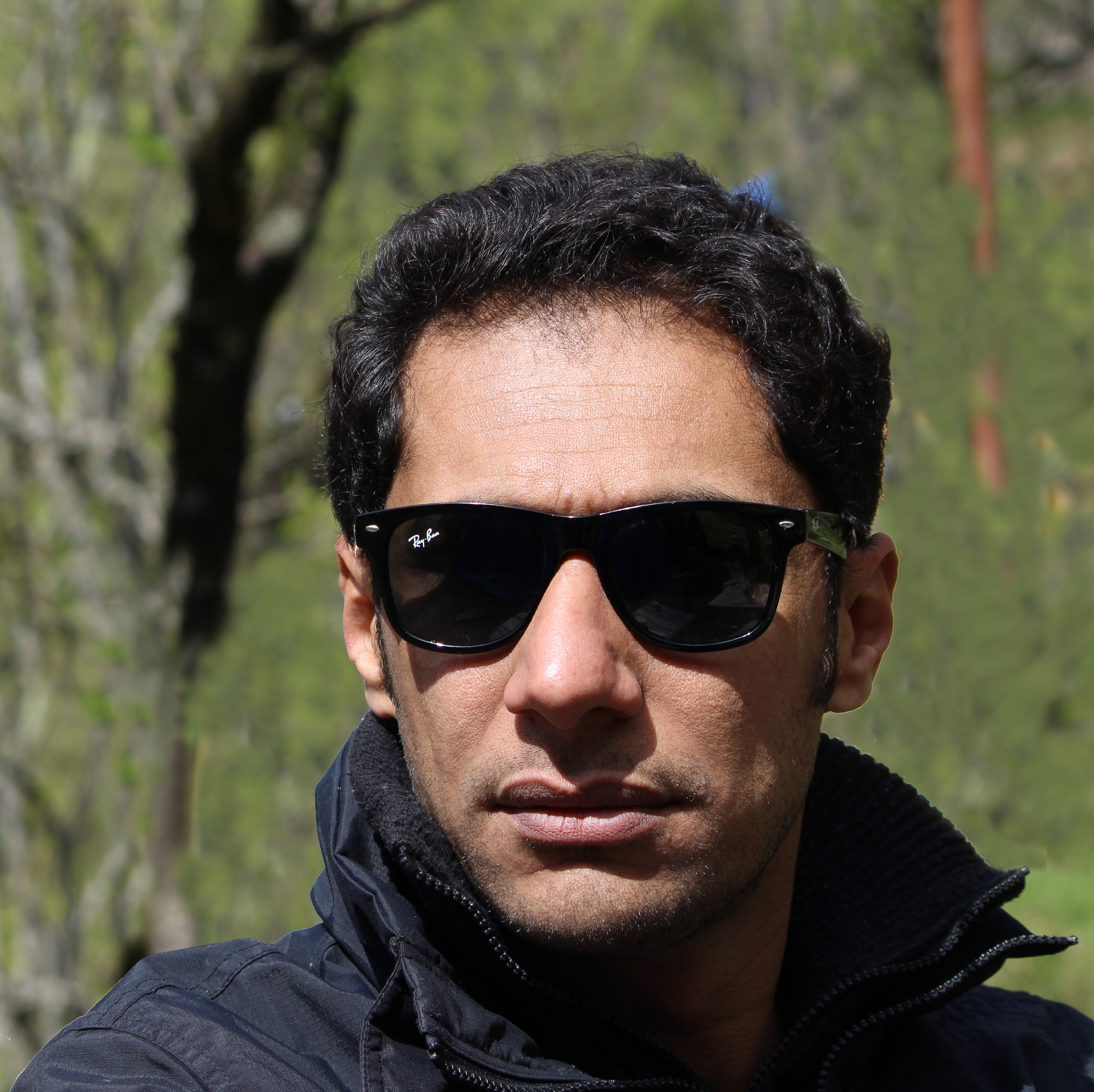
- Jatinder Mauhar in 2016, Los Angeles
- Born: Bhutta, Punjab, India
- Education: Panjab University
- Alma mater: Government Institute of Textile Chemistry and Knitting Technology, Ludhiana
- Occupations: Director, Script Writer, Columnist, Researcher
- Years active: 2006 – Present

Jatinder Mauhar is an Indian Film Director, Script Writer, Columnist and Researcher. In the very beginning, he started his career with music videos and it was after some time that Jatinder Directed his debut film Mitti. Jatinder Mauhar established himself as a style through Mitti (2010), Sarsa appropriated by producer as Sikandar (2013) and Qissa Punjab (2015). He has written extensively about cinema and is one of the best speakers in Punjabi on cinema. He did his professional training in Knitting Technology, and worked in the industry for couple of years before pursuing his interest in cinema. His journey from a keen watcher to filmmaker is punctuated with training in Zee Institute of Media Arts, Mumbai and on job training in making music videos as director. He has written story, screenplay and dialogues of Mitti. In Sarsa he collaborated with Daljit Ami. Jatinder worked on a documentary film on cross-border train Samjhauta Express as a researcher with filmmaker Gerry Troyna For BBC.

== Early life and background ==
Jatinder Mauhar hails from Village Bhutta, District Fatehgarh Sahib (Punjab).Jatinder took to literature under the influence his mother and maternal family. His mother was an avid reader of literature herself. Jatinder first wrote a play while studying in the sixth standard. It was on this play that he adapted his first screenplay in 2005. The project named Tandeera never materialized on screen.

=== Education ===
Jatinder did his primary education from village school and then he moved to Govt. High school Farour for his secondary education and even during this period, he remained a film buff. He would skip school often and watch films instead in local theatre and on VCR which was a common trend in 90s in villages. He completed a three-year diploma in knitting technology from Government Institute of Textile Chemistry and Knitting Technology, Ludhiana. He worked as a knitting technician in different Knitting Mills in Ludhiana for two years. He couldn't fit himself into this space so gave with this profession.

== Career ==
He started his career with directing music videos. Simultaneously he completed diploma in film direction from Zee Institute of Media Arts, Mumbai In 2005, he made his directorial debut with Mitti, which earned critical success. He has created a separate niche in Punjabi Film Industry. His cinema leaves a social impact. His films talk about social and political issues of the state and the call of youth about it. He has also worked as a researcher with filmmaker Gerry Troyna on a documentary film on cross-border train Samjhauta Express

He is a frequent contributor to various blogs and various newspapers as well. Many of his writings got published in different newspapers.

== Style themes and influences ==
The movie "Mitti" came at such a time when Punjabi cinema was reviving well in business but lacked any critical commentary on the social concerns. The name of Jatinder Mauhar left its imprint with this movie and further came into reckoning as a director with meaningful movies. Jatinder regularly writes about the Indian and World cinema. His films adorn the anti-establishment tone and his writings give the picture of someone who is well versed with the concrete realities of the society. His cinema has put the cinema of issues on forefront and crafted a niche of its own.

A collection of various articles by Jatinder Mauhar is also going to be published soon.

== Filmography ==
Year	Title	Role	Notes
2010	Mitti	Director, writer	
2013	Sikander	Director, Writer	
2014	Samjhauta Express (Documentary film)	Researcher	
2015	Qissa Panjab	Director	
2022	Saade Aale	Director	
2022	Adh Chanani Raat (Crescent Night)	Actor	
2023	Maurh	Director	

=== Mitti (2010) ===
Mitti engages with youth in an intense but complex dialogue. Through this dialogue, the youth approaches history through earlier generations and the history is full of rebelliousness. Their efforts to stand in continuity of rich historical tradition expose the nexus of politics, profit and religion. This nexus is depriving people of respectable life and resources of livelihood by advancing its own interests. Here the source of livelihood is Land, also called Mitti. Rabbi, Gaazi, Laali and Tunda has been suspended from the university years ago but they are still staying in Chandigarh, in a bungalow which has been forcibly occupied. They are helping Harmel Singh in his business of politics and liquor. Laali's brother is a peasant leader who wants to familiarize them to the harsh realities of life. They don't have time or patience to listen. He is trying to build the association but they are hell-bent on detachment. With the passage of time and ugly turn of events they realize that their life is worst then beasts. Their struggle for rehabilitation as better human being is an achievement of the film. Tactically unskilled, they realize that the socio-political dynamics is complex and struggle against nefarious nexus is more difficult than they imagined. The story moves, as experience demands patience and precision whereas youthful energy wants to produce immediate results. What an interaction between experience and youthful energy. It can't be always inclusive or antagonistic. In the film the word Mitti keeps expanding in meaning and scope. Through instances it travels from a noun to metaphor, which means history, tradition, culture, values, honesty, responsibility and sense of belonging.

=== Sikander (2013) ===
In Panjab University Chandigarh, there are two rival groups of students are fighting for hegemony, one led by ‘Harjang’ and other by ‘Fateh’. Both have been patronized by political leaders. Patronization keeps on shifting with changing political scenario. Politicians use students as muscle power to capture booths, businesses and settle political scores. University has been turned into a minuscule of the bigger political scene. ‘Sikander’ belongs to a backward village and has come to study in Panjab University Chandigarh. After the Murder of Fateh he takes refuge to cold-blooded violence. Sikander's group corporatized the illegal businesses under political patronage. They capture cable network, sand mining and real estate. Their rival group is equally violent and competes against them on every front. They negotiate their animosity in student elections. Their public narrative is voluble but they win elections with brutal force of money and muscle. Here the use of money and muscle may not be at the scale of general politics but it sounds that university is a perfect theatre for political rehearsals. Meanwhile, Sikander has a soft corner for his former girlfriend ‘Beant’. Beant is a confident girl studying in University. She wants to live life on her own terms i.e. equal terms with everyone. Her life-style symbolizes her conviction towards life. She continues to live her way despite being victim of emotional break up and crude gender violence. Beant thinks that main reason of violence is rooted in society, contemporary political culture and insensitive educational institutions. She intends to change the atmosphere which is congenial for violence. In the passage of struggle she realizes that she is not alone as victim or as crusader. Beant and her friends challenge both groups in elections. They respond to their voluble narrative with logic. The small minority comprises diversity of students. For them questioning the political hierarchy is a response to call of history. They are sure that they can avoid this call but morally they are bound to respond. Their response questions the basic nature of educational institutions and role of youth in politics. They link their response to historical events and process which have contributed to make our society humane and compassionate. The film leaves the audience with lots of unanswered questions. Audience all over world can relate to the film as it represents contemporary Punjab in finer details which is not very different from other regions

==== Sarsa v/s Sikander Controversy ====
Jatinder disowned his second film ‘Sikandar’ which was initially ‘Sarsa’. He objected to edit which was suggested by producers and upon their disagreement he and the co-writer Daljit Ami claimed that they disassociated themselves before the release. And the film was released with the changed title (Sikandar) and with considerable interference with the edit that changed what he wanted to convey.

=== Qissa Panjab (2015) ===
The film tells the story of youth of Punjab which is deep entrenched in problems like drugs, unemployment etc. The films revolves around the lives of six lead characters which took an ugly when they cross each other. The film received acclaim for its story and depiction of contemporary problems of society. The film traces the story of Deep, a basketball player who along with Arjun (who is son a rich urban landlord), gets into drug trade. On the other side is Kismat, who is a theatre artist and dancer and shares a relationship with Heera, who is a local singer. Speed is a petty thief who falls in love with Sukhjeet, who is raised by her Uncle and Aunt after the death of her father and has a drug addict for brother. The film through the lives of these characters exposes the cruel realities of how lack of meaning opportunities is pushing the youth into the trap of drugs.

The film drew critical response and was selected as the opening film at IFFSA/PIFF Toronto, the Official Selection for Ritz International Film Festival Florida and Official Selection for Seattle South Asian Film Festival.

=== Maurh ===
Maurh is based on the lives of Jeon and Kishna Maurh, who had risen against the oppression of both the British and zamindars in pre-partition Punjab. Unable to tolerate humiliation of their family, Kishna joins the bandits. When Kishna is executed by the Brits, Jeona takes up arms to fight for his people. Maurh is a tale of revenge, betrayal and valour.

=== Adh Chanani Raat (Crescent Night) ===
The film is based a novel by Gurdial Singh and he writes about character Modan, who just returned from prison after many years and he is trying to rebuild his life. Jatinder Mauhar has played Modan and film is directed by Gurvinder Singh.

=== Saade Aale ===
First look of the film unveiled at Cannes Film Festival on 16 May 2018. Jatinder Mauhar directed the film and stars Deep Sidhu whose previous film Jora 10 Numbaria was critically acclaimed. Saade Aale film is based on Kabbadi and set in rural Punjab. Film is about people's attachment with Kabbadi sport in Punjab.
