= Jora: The Second Chapter =

- Directed by: Amardeep Singh Gill
- Starring: Deep Sidhu; Singga; Japji Khaira; Mahie Gill; Dharmendra; Gugu Gill; Hobby Dhaliwal
- Release date: 6 March 2020
- Country: India
- Language: Punjabi

Jora: The Second Chapter is a 2020 Indian Punjabi-language film directed by Ambeedeep Singh Gill. A sequel to Jora 10 Numbaria (2017) it stars Deep Sidhu as the gangster Jora and follows his rise to political power. Singga, Japji Khaira, Mahie Gill, Dharmendra, Gugu Gill and Hobby Dhaliwal also star in the film. It was released theatrically on 6 March 2020.

== Cast ==
- Deep Sidhu as Jora
- Singga
- Japji Khaira
- Mahie Gill
- Dharmendra
- Gugu Gill
- Hobby Dhaliwal
