= Singga =

Indian singer, actor, director

- Born: Manpreet Singh; 26 February 1992 (age 34); Jangliana, Punjab, India
- Origin: Punjab
- Genres: Bhangra; filmi; pop
- Occupations: Singer; songwriter; actor; director
- Instruments: Vocal; piano; guitar
- Years active: 2012–present
- Labels: Single Track; Speed Records; Times Music; SagaHits
- Website: Singga on Instagram

Manpreet Singh, professionally known as Singga, is an Indian singer, songwriter, actor, rapper, lyricist, composer, producer and director associated with Punjabi Music and Punjabi cinema. He is best known for his bollywood songs "Badnam", "Sheh", "Shadow", "Photo", "Jatt Di Clip 2" and "Brotherhood" in indian music industry. He made his acting debut with bollywood movie, Jora: The Second Chapter in film industry.

== Personal life ==
Singga was born as Manpreet Singh on 26 February 1992 in Jangliana, Hoshiarpur in the state of Punjab, India. He belongs to a Sikh Rajput family. Manpreet Singh completes his graduation and Post-Graduation in M.A History.

== Career ==
Singga works in variety of music styles, including Global rock, Indian classical, Pop, Bhangra, Filmi, Reggae, Romantic, hiphop, gangsta rap, trap, hardcore hip-hop, R & B. He began his music career in 2012 with name Mr Sing Rajput but didn't get much fame. So he renamed as Singga and worked as lyricist in song "Badnam" sung by Mankirt Aulakh released in September 2017 which became too famous and he got recognition in the Punjabi industry. In December 2018, his debut song "Jatt Di Clip 2" was released under the banner of Single Track Studios.In February 2021, his first romantic song "Teri Load Ve" with Urvashi Rautela was released by Speed Records.

Singga got his breakthrough in Punjabi Cinema with his debut movie "Jora:The Second Chapter" starring Deep Sidhu, Dharmendra, Mahie Gill, Japji Khaira, Sardar Sohi, Gugu Gill and Yaad Grewal.

== Discography ==
As Singer
Year	Song	Music	Label	Notes
2018	Jatt Di Clip 2	Western Penduz	Single Track Studios	Debut song
2018	Fire Marda 2	Western Penduz	Single Track Studios	
2018	Brave	Mofusion	Mankirt Aulakh Music	
2018	Trunk	Mofusion	Mankirt Aulakh Music	
2018	Do Or Die	Mofusion	Mankirt Aulakh Music	
2018	RIP	Mofusion	Mankirt Aulakh Music	
2019	Sheh	Ellde Fazilka	Vaaho Entertainment	
	Shadow	MixSingh	Lokdhun Punjabi	
	One Man	MixSingh	Single Track Studios	
	Photo	Ellde Fazilka	Speed record	
	Yaar Jatt De	Desi Crew	Speed record	Video by Sukh Sanghera
	Wardaat	Desi Crew	Patiala Shahi Records	
	Hobbies	Mofusion	Single Track Studios	
	Robinhood (Desi Jatt)	Western Penduz	GEET MP3	
	Dil Mutiyar Da	Jassi X	Nupur Audio	
	Badmaashi 2	Ellde Fazilka	Singga Music	featuring Afsana Khan
2020	Dildariyan	Gill Saab	Bamb Beats	Produced by Amrit Maan
	S.H.O	MixSingh	Speed record	featuring B. N. Sharma
	CCTV	MixSingh	Planet Recordz	
	Bapu Nal Pyar	The Kidd	Nupur Audio	featuring Yograj Singh
	Shut Your Mouth	The Kidd	White Hill Music	
	Compete	The Kidd	T-Series (company)	
	Aadat	G Skillz	Singga Music	
	Gun Lifestyle	G Skillz	Worldwide Records Punjabi	
2021	Teri Load Ve	Ellde Fazilka	Speed record	featuring Urvashi Rautela
	Life Line	Young Army	Vaaho Entertainment	
	Badnam Munda	Young Army	Speed Records	
	Enemy	Archie Muzik	T-Series (company)	
	Dil Todna	Desi Crew	Times Music	featuring Sonia Mann
	Raatan Teriyan	Jassi X	TPZ Records	
	Zehar	Kill Banda	TPZ Records	
	100 Gulab	Young Army	Times Music	
	Raja Rani	Young Army	Saga Music	
2022	Chahat	Gurmeet Singh	Super Beats and Records	
2022	Saali Bewkuf	Fame	Singga Music	
2022	LV	Big Kay SMG	Singga Music	Lyrics by Ilam
2022	Mobster	Deep Jandu	Singga Music	
2022	Still Alive	Big Kay SMG	Singga Music	
2022	All Bad	Big Kay SMG	Singga Music	

As featured artist and lyricist
Year	Song	Singer	Label	Notes
2018	Brotherhood	Mankirt Aulakh	Saga Music	First song as featuring artist
	Youth	Mankirt Aulakh	Mankirt Aulakh Music	
2019	Your Dad	Alfaaz	Mofusion Studios	
2021	Laare	Naaz Aulakh	Desi Junction	Music by Gur Sidhu
	Raund 2.0	Gill Manuke & Gurlez Akhtar	Singga Music	

As Lyricist
Year	Song	Singer	Label	Notes
2018	Badnam	Mankirt Aulakh	Speed Records	First song as lyricist
2018	Jatt Di Clip	Mankirt Aulakh	Mankirt Aulakh Music	
2018	Purje	Mankirt Aulakh	Saga Music	
2018	Hunter	Dj Flow	Speed Records	
2018	One Million	Jazzy B	Speed Records	
2019	College	Mankirt Aulakh	Mankirt Aulakh Music	
2020	Odhi Shreaam	Himanshi Khurana	Brand B	

== Filmography ==
Year	Film	Actor	Singer	Lyricist	Notes
2019	Blackia	Yes	Yes	Yes	
2019	Ardab Mutiyaran	No	Yes	Yes	
2020	Yaar Anmulle Returns	No	Yes	No	
2020	Jora : The Second Chapter	Yes	Yes	Yes	Debut movie as lead actor
2021	Kade Haan Kade Naa	Yes	Yes	Yes	
2023	Mining: Reyte te Kabza	Yes	Yes	Yes	Pan India Release in Punjabi, Hindi, Marathi, Tamil, Telugu on 28 April 2023
TBA	Sayonee	Yes	Yes	Yes	Post-Production
TBA	Uchiyaan Udariyaan	Yes	Yes	Yes	Post-Production
