= Saade Aale =

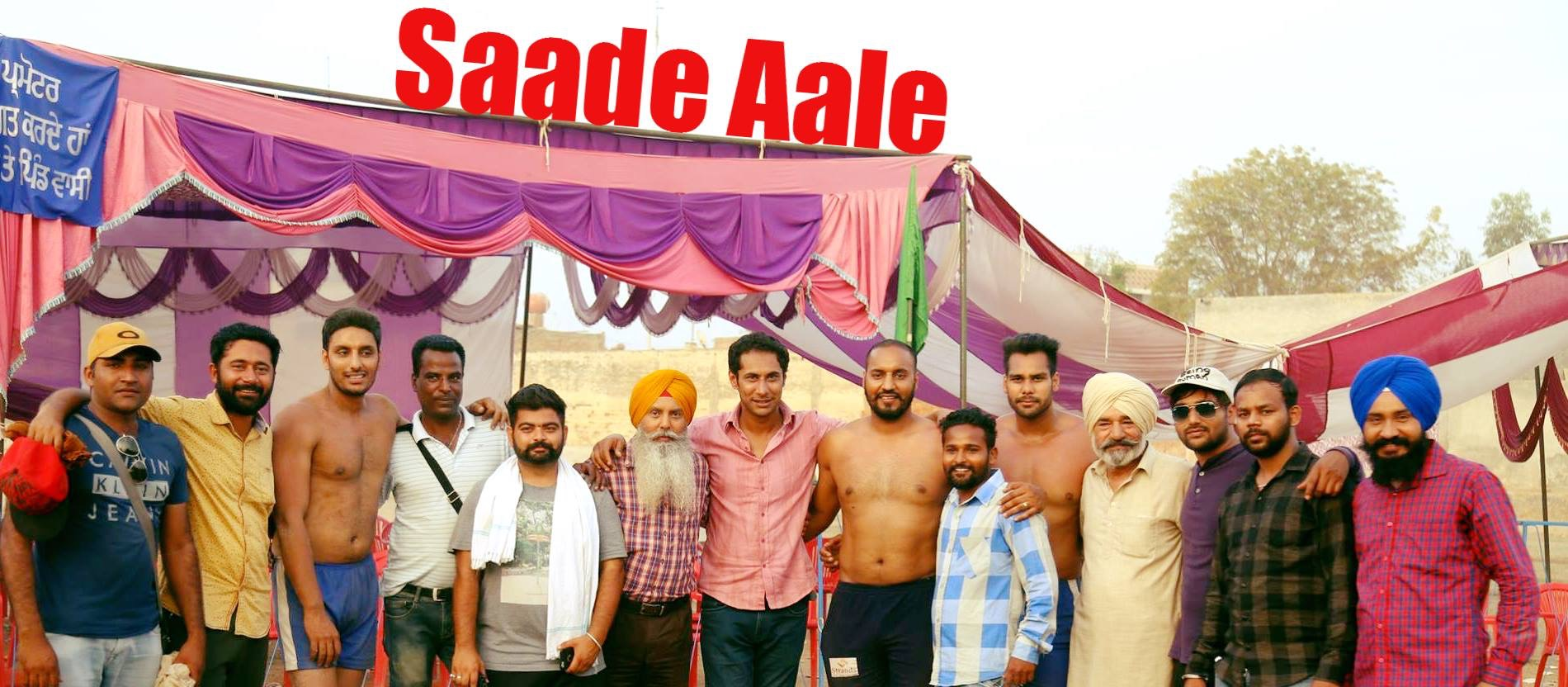
- Film Poster
- Directed by: Jatinder Mauhar
- Written by: Balwinder Singh Garewal, Jatinder Mauhar Daljit Ami
- Starring: Deep Sidhu; Sukh Deep Sukh; Amrit Aulakh; Guggu Gill; Mahabir Bhullar; Sonpreet Jwandha; Binder Pal Fateh
- Cinematography: Apal Singh
- Edited by: Hardik Singh Reen
- Music by: Gurmoh, Mukhtar Sahota, Empire Studio
- Production company: Saga Films
- Release date: 29 April 2022
- Country: India
- Language: Punjabi

Saade Aale is a 2022 Indian Punjabi-language sports drama film directed by Jatinder Mauhar. The film features Sukhdeep Sukh, Deep Sidhu, Guggu Gill, and Mahabir Bhullar in lead roles, with Nitu Pandher, Amrit Aulakh, and Sonpreet Jawanda in secondary roles. It was released on 29 April, 2022.

== Cast ==
- Deep Sidhu as Manjeet
- Sukhdeep Sukh
- Amrit Aulakh as Raavi
- Guggu Gill
- Mahabir Bhullar
- Nimrla Ghuman as Billu
- Sonpreet Jwandha
- Nitu Pandheri
- Binder Pal Fateh as Welder
- Pali Sandhu as Manga Refree
- Saumya Joshi as Harpreet
- Jarmanjeet Singh as Kabaddi Player
- Jassi Jaspreet as Kabaddi Player
- Jodhan Raj as Kabaddi Player
- Karandeep Singh as Kabaddi Player

== Soundtrack ==
The soundtrack of Saade Aale is composed by Gurmoh, Mukhtar Sahota, Music Empire. Yaar Vichre is sung by Amrinder Gill, wrriten by Binder Pal Fateh and composed by Mukhtar Sahota.

Track listing
| No. | Title | Lyrics | Music | Singer(s) | Length |
|---|---|---|---|---|---|
| 1. | "Saade Aale Title Track" | Sai Sultan | Empire Studio | Gurnam Bhullar | 1:33 |
| 2. | "Yaar Vichre" | Binder Pal Fateh | Mukhtar Sahota | Amrinder Gill | 2:11 |
| 3. | "Kabbadi" | Makhan Brar | Empire Studio | Labh Heera | 2:26 |
| 4. | "Cheere Waleya" | Jatinder Mauhar | Gurmoh | Harshdeep Kaur | 3:48 |

== Reception ==
The Times of India rated it 2.5 out of 5 and wrote, "The last film of Deep Sidhu is an intense drama, which unfortunately failed to maintain a strong grip." A critic from Ghaint Punjab was disappointed with the film, expressing that the director, Jatinder Mauhar, failed to effectively convey the emotions and storyline, resulting in a dramatic shift in the second half that left the audience confused. They also felt that some excitement or "tadka" should have been added to make it more engaging. Jagbani gave a positive review to the film.

== See also ==
- List of highest-grossing Punjabi films
