= Mardistan (film) =

Mardistan (Macholand): Reflections on Indian Manhood is a Punjabi documentary by Harjant Gill. It was produced by Public Service Broadcasting Trust.

== Synopsis ==
The documentary revolves around four Punjabi men from different backgrounds and generations. Amandeep Sandhu is a writer who tries to understand the physical and sexual abuse he witnessed while he was studying in an elite military academy. Gurpreet Singh is a Sikh father who has twin daughters and is resisting the pressure to produce a son. Tarun is young college student who wants to have a girlfriend to lose his virginity. Dhananjay a working-class gay activist who tells the truth to his wife after twenty years of marriage.

== Awards ==
- Second Place - Best Documentary (SCRIPT Film Festival, Kochi – February 2015)
