= Jora 10 Numbaria =

- Wording
- Directed by: Amardeep Singh Gill
- Written by: Amardeep Singh Gill
- Produced by: Mandeep Singh Sidhu; Amardeep Singh Gill PRODUCTION ASSISTANT: Jaspal mand (jass mand)
- Starring: Deep Sidhu; Dharmendra
- Cinematography: Soni Singh
- Edited by: Hardik Singh Reen
- Music by: Sachin Ahuja; Sunny and Inder Bawra
- Release date: 1 September 2017
- Running time: 138 minutes
- Country: India
- Language: Punjabi

Jora 10 Numbaria is a 2017 Indian Punjabi-language film written and directed by Amardeep Singh Gill, starring Deep Sidhu in the title role of the gangster Jora. It was followed by Gill's Jora: The Second Chapter in 2020 with Sidhu reprising his role, focusing on Jora's rise to political power after becoming a gangster.

== Plot ==
A traumatic childhood and a corrupt justice system push a young man to become a ruthless gangster.

== Cast ==
- Dharmendra as Jagga Baba
- Deep Sidhu as Jora
- Mukul Dev as Shera
- Mukesh Tiwari as Sultan Ahmed Qureshi
- Hobby Dhaliwal as Teja Aulakh
- Kul Sidhu as Kali
- Rahul Sharma as Teja's Driver
- Rohit Sharma as Pallavi's Brother
- Gaurav Rana as Harish Producer
- Sardar Sohi as Police officer
- Yaad Grewal as Deepa

== Sequel ==
Jora: The Second Chapter was released on 6 March 2020.

== Soundtrack ==
Jora 10 Numbaria

Soundtrack album by Inder Bawra, Sachin Ahuja & Sunny Bawara
- Released: 17 August 2017
- Genre: Feature film soundtrack
- Length: 24:51
- Label: Yellow Music
External audio
- Jukebox on YouTube

Tracklist
No.	Title	Lyrics	Music	Singer(s)	Length
1.	"Jora 10 Numbaria"	Amardeep Singh Gill	Sunny Bawra & Inder Bawra	Gippy Grewal	03:36
2.	"Mulakat"	Padamshri Surjit Patar Ji	Sachin Ahuja	Shazia Manzoor	04:26
3.	"Bathinde Wale Bai"	Amardeep Singh Gill	Sachin Ahuja	Ninja	03:29
4.	"Vailly"	Ranjit Matt Sheron Wala	Sachin Ahuja	Labh Heera	04:11
5.	"Shagan"	Manpreet Tiwana & Traditional	Sachin Ahuja	Sardaar Ali & Hasan Ali	09:11
Total length:					24:51

== Release ==
The film released in India on September 1, 2017 .

== Awards and nominations ==
Award	Date of ceremony	Category	Recipient	Result
Filmfare Awards Punjabi	23 March 2018	Best Film (critics)	Jora 10 Numbaria	Nominated
Filmfare Awards Punjabi	23 March 2018	Best Actor (critics)	Deep Sidhu	Nominated
Filmfare Awards Punjabi	23 March 2018	Best Debut Director	Amardeep Singh Gill	Nominated
Filmfare Awards Punjabi	23 March 2018	Best Background Score	Sunny Bawra - Inder Bawra	Won
Filmfare Awards Punjabi	23 March 2018	Best Screenplay	Amardeep Singh Gill	Nominated
Filmfare Awards Punjabi	23 March 2018	Best Dialogue	Amardeep Singh Gill	Nominated
Filmfare Awards Punjabi	23 March 2018	Best Action	Salaam Ansari	Won
PTC Punjabi Film Awards	30 March 2018	Best Actor	Deep Sidhu	Nominated
PTC Punjabi Film Awards	30 March 2018	Best Debut Director	Amardeep Singh Gill	Won
PTC Punjabi Film Awards	30 March 2018	Best Dialogues	Amardeep Singh Gill	Nominated
PTC Punjabi Film Awards	30 March 2018	Best Screenplay	Amardeep Singh Gill	Nominated
PTC Punjabi Film Awards	30 March 2018	Best Role in Negative	Hobby Dhaliwal	Nominated
PTC Punjabi Film Awards	30 March 2018	Best Playback Singer Female	Shazia Manzoor	Nominated
PTC Punjabi Film Awards	30 March 2018	Best Background Score	Sunny Bawra & Inder Bawra	Nominated
PTC Punjabi Film Awards	30 March 2018	Best Editing	Hardik Singh Reen	Nominated
PTC Punjabi Film Awards	30 March 2018	Best Action	Salaam Ansari	Won
PTC Punjabi Film Awards	30 March 2018	Best Cinematography	Soni Singh	Nominated

== See also ==
- Ramta Jogi
