= Silence... Can You Hear It? =

2021 thriller film

- Promotional poster
- Directed by: Aban Bharucha Deohans
- Written by: Aban Bharucha Deohans
- Produced by: Shariq Patel; Candid Creations
- Starring: Manoj Bajpayee; Prachi Desai; Arjun Mathur; Barkha Singh
- Cinematography: Arvind Singh
- Edited by: Sandeep Kumar Sethy
- Music by: Gaurav Godkhindi
- Production companies: Zee Studios; Candid Creations
- Distributed by: ZEE5
- Release date: 26 March 2021
- Running time: 136 minutes
- Country: India
- Language: Hindi

Silence... Can You Hear It? is a 2021 Indian Hindi-language thriller film written and directed by Aban Bharucha Deohans. The film produced by Zee Studios, stars Manoj Bajpayee, Prachi Desai and Arjun Mathur. The story of the film revolves around the mysterious disappearance of a woman. It was digitally released on ZEE5 on 26 March 2021. The film marks Desai's comeback after 4 years.

A sequel titled Silence 2: The Night Owl Bar Shootout was released on April 16, 2024.

== Plot ==
A team of special cops are investigating the murder of a high-profile victim, the daughter of a retired justice. The team is led by ACP Avinash Verma from the narcotics division. The higher-ups don't favour Avinash but the retired Justice Choudhary insists he is the best man to solve his daughter's murder and requests that he be hired. Pooja Choudhary, the victim, was found on a hilltop by four college students. The forensic department had found bits of copper on her wound. The officers reason that the motive was a personal one and the killer is someone who knew Pooja.

Pooja last visited her best friend Kavita's house to show her something. But Kavita had gone to Pune so Pooja had spent the night in Kavita's house as it was very late. Kavita's husband Ravi is an MLA. He and Dadu the servant were there when Pooja had arrived. Verma sets off to investigate and interrogates everyone that knows Pooja: Rishabh (her close friend) and his fiancée Kia, her family, Ravi, Kavita (who fell into a coma after falling down the stairs), Ravi's connections, and unusual suspects Sunny and Shrikant.

Verma deduces that Ravi is involved in Pooja’s death and Sunny was an aide in it. However, while apprehending him, Sunny gets killed by an opposition gang and Verma is injured. After recovering, he pushes through to find the truth, despite the constant hurdles created by Ravi, the media and the department.

Verma manages to finish the case in time and the plot is revealed to all. Pooja and Rishabh had an affair, which Kia discovered. Enraged, she visited Pooja after learning she was at Kavita's place and demanded that Pooja stay away from Rishabh. Pooja told her to speak to Rishabh, not her. This angered Kia and resulted in an altercation, during which she grabbed a lamp and hit Pooja hard on the head, killing her on the spot. Realizing what she just did, she fled in terror. Rishabh entered next and fled the house as well. When Ravi entered, he hoped to escape from this messy situation to protect his political career, and took help from his connections, including Sunny. Kavita entered and was terrorized by the scene, much to Ravi’s shock. However, Kaviha slipped from the stairs and became comatose. Based on evidences found parallelly from Verma and his team, Kia is arrested for Pooja's murder, while Rishabh and Ravi are arrested for tampering with the evidence.

== Cast ==
- Manoj Bajpayee as ACP Avinash Verma IPS
- Prachi Desai as Inspector Sanjana Bhatia
- Arjun Mathur as MLA Ravi Khanna
- Barkha Singh as Pooja Choudhary
- Hitha Chandrashekhar as Kavita Khanna
- Sahil Vaid as Inspector Amit Chauhan
- Ujjwal Gauraha as Saneshwar (Sunny)
- Shishir Sharma as Justice Chaudhary, Pooja's father
- Denzil Smith as Commissioner Sanjay Sharma IPS
- Vaquar Shaikh as Inspector Raj Gupta
- Sohaila Kapoor as Mrs. Chaudhary, Pooja's mother
- Amit Thakkar as Rishabh
- Bhushan Shimpi as Javed
- Garima Yagnik as Kia
- Pankaj Anand as Irfaan Bhai

== Release ==
Initially the digital release date was on 5 March 2021 on ZEE5 platform. Later, it was released on 26 March 2021.

== Reception ==
Response to the film was mixed. The Indian Express called it an "entertaining murder mystery" but gave it 2 stars out of 5. JoginderTuteja of Rediff Movies wrote "Silence... Can You Hear It? is definitely a recommended watch". Gurnaaz Kaur, in a review for The Tribune, wrote, "The movie Silence…can you hear it? is a screaming bore!".
