= Raduaa =

- Directed by: Nav Bajwa
- Written by: Baldev Ghuman
- Story by: Nav Bajwa
- Produced by: Anushk Naredi, Nav Bajwa, Anup Kumar
- Starring: Nav Bajwa; Gurpreet Ghuggi; BN Sharma; Satinder Satti; Vaibhvi Joshi
- Cinematography: Gifty Kang
- Edited by: Puneet ASP
- Music by: Ullumanati
- Production companies: Nav Bajwa Films, Big Bat Films
- Release date: 11 May 2018
- Running time: 130 minutes
- Country: India
- Language: Punjabi

Raduaa is an Indian Punjabi science fiction film directed by and starring Nav Bajwa with Gurpreet Ghuggi and Satinder Satti. The film's plot is based upon a scientific experiment which unexpectedly results in time travel from the present day to 1955. The film was released on 11 May 2018.

Raduaa Returns, a sequel released on 2024.

== Plot ==
It is a comedy science fiction movie where four people living in 2018 travel back in time to 1955. Nav (Nav Bajwa) – an IT expert, Sukhi (Gurpreet Ghuggi) – a mechanic, and Hem Chand Lamba (B. N. Sharma) – a lab technician, are living as tenants in Chandigarh. Their landlady is Jasmeen (Satinder Satti). Sukhi and Hem Chand do not pay rent regularly; she warns them either to pay rent or vacate. Nav has invented a machine which he calls Raduaa and earns money with it. Sukhi's relationship with his wife, who had high dreams, is strained. She leaves him along with her son and asks him to pay 15 lacs if he want to meet his son. Sukhi tries to steal the money but is caught. Nav and Hem Chand try to help him by intercepting a call of drug dealers through his Raduaa. The three impersonate drug dealers and go to an agreed location for the deal, but the police arrive and the three of them are caught. However, when the police find that they are not carrying drugs, they are released. Nav thinks that someone is hearing their calls and thinks that Raduaa is not working properly. While trying to repair it, Jasmeen comes. In the commotion Hem Chand accidentally throws the beaker, containing a green chemical; there are electric shocks and the four travel back to 1955 where they appear in a village. The villagers look at them with suspicion. The sarpanch of the village gives them refuge and they work together to return to 2018. Whether they succeed in returning or something more mysterious is in wait is to be seen.

== Cast ==
- Nav Bajwa
- Vaibhavi Joshi
- Gurpreet Ghuggi
- Satinder Satti
- B. N. Sharma
- Mahaveer Bhuller
- Gurpreet Bhangu

== Release ==
Raduaa was released theatrically on 11 May 2018.
