= Lodi Fort =

Citadel in Ludhiana, Punjab, India

The Lodi Fort (Punjabi: ਪੁਰਾਣਾ ਕਿਲਾ, romanized: Purāṇā Kila, lit. 'Old Fort'), also spelt as Lodhi Fort, is a citadel in the city of Ludhiana, Punjab, India. The fortress is located on the banks of the river Sutlej and contains a tunnel leading to the neighboring town of Phillaur.

== History ==
It was built over 500 years ago during the reign of the Sikandar Khan Lodi and was well-maintained under the reign of Ranjit Singh and the British after him, but then fell into disrepair. It was declared a state-protected monument in December 2013.

The Government Institute of Textile Chemistry and Knitting Technology was initially based in the fort campus which is now shifted to the new address at Z - Block, Rishi Nagar, Ludhiana.

== See also ==
- Lodi dynasty
- Phillaur Fort
- Sikandar Khan Lodi
