= Harjant Gill =

Indian documentary filmmaker

Harjant Gill is an Indian documentary filmmaker and teaches visual anthropology at Towson University. His films explore topics related to gender, sexuality, religion and belonging in India and among Indians in diaspora. Gill is the author of Coming of Age in Macholand: Masculinity, Patriarchy, and the Search for Freedom in Indian Punjab, to be published by the University of Chicago Press.

== Personal life ==
Gill was born in Chandigarh, India; grew up in the San Francisco Bay Area, California; and now lives in Washington, D.C.

== Filmography ==
- Sent Away Boys (2016)
- Mardistan (documentary) (2014)
- Roots of Love (2011)
- Lot's Wife (2008)
- Milind Soman Made Me Gay (2007)
- Some Reasons For Living (2003)
- Everything (2002)
