= Ishqaa =

- Theatrical poster
- Directed by: Nav Bajwa
- Produced by: Nav Bajwa Films; Gurpreet Chadda
- Starring: Nav Bajwa; Aman Singh Deep; Payal Rajput; Karamjit Anmol; Satwant Kaur; Dr. Ranjit; Gurpreet Chadda
- Cinematography: Gifty Kang
- Edited by: Puneet ASP
- Music by: Gurcharan Singh
- Production companies: Turbanater Entertainment; AK Production
- Distributed by: Globe Moviez
- Release date: 4 January 2019
- Country: India
- Language: Punjabi

Ishqaa (ਇਸ਼ਕਾ) is an Indian romantic thriller Punjabi film directed by Nav Bajwa and starring Nav Bajwa, Aman Singh Deep, Payal Rajput and Karamjit Anmol as the main protagonists of the film. This is the first production and direction of Nav Bajwa Films.

== Cast ==
- Nav Bajwa
- Aman Singh Deep
- Payal Rajput
- Karamjit Anmol
- Shivinder Mahal
- Satwant Kaur
- Dr. Ranjit
- Gurpreet Chadda

== Soundtrack ==
The soundtrack of the film by Money Aujla and score by Gurcharan Singh, lyrics are by Sidhu Moosewala and Maninder Kailey. The songs are sung by Hardy Sandhu, Akhil, Dilpreet Dhillon, Harshdeep, Kamal Khaan, Naman Hanjra, Masha Ali and Sufi Sparrow.
