= Government Institute of Textile Chemistry and Knitting Technology =

Government polytechnic college at Ludhiana Punjab

Government Institute of Textile Chemistry and Knitting Technology, Ludhiana
- Formation: 1967
- Type: Polytechnic
- Location: Z - Block, Rishi Nagar, Ludhiana-141001
- Official language: Punjabi, English
- Website: www.gitcktpolyldh.ac.in

Government Institute of Textile Chemistry and Knitting Technology (GITC&KT) is a Government polytechnic college at Ludhiana Punjab. The college is affiliated with the Punjab State Board of Technical Education and Industrial Training Chandigarh, India.

== History ==
GITC&KT is one of the oldest Government Institute of Dyeing and Calico Printing. It was started under the name of Government Dyeing School in the year 1916, in the premises of Government central Weavery, Lahore. In 1923 after adding Calico Printing its name was changed to Government Institute of Dyeing and Calico Printing in Foreman Christian College, Shahdara near Lahore now in Pakistan.

== Present ==
In 1967, the Institute was upgraded to polytechnic and renamed Government Institute of Textile Chemistry and Knitting Technology, Ludhiana. The present Institute is an amalgamation of two old Institutes viz. Government Hosiery Institute, Ludhiana (established 1926) and Government Institute of Dyeing and Calico Printing Ludhiana (established 1923) located in the same premises.

The college was initially based in the Old fort, near Daresi ground, Ludhiana now shifted to the new address.

== Courses ==
There are various Diploma and certificate courses the major branches are

- Textile Processing
- Textile Technology (Knitting)

== Alumni ==
Jatinder Mauhar studied from the GITC&KT.

== See also ==
- Punjab State Board of Technical Education and Industrial Training
- Lodhi Fort
