= Sahil Vaid =

Indian actor (born 1986)

- Born: Sahil Satish Vaid; 24 September 1986 (age 39); Salem, Tamil Nadu, India
- Education: Whistling Woods International
- Occupations: Actor; dubbing artist
- Years active: 2012–present

Sahil Satish Vaid (born 24 September 1986) is an Indian actor who is known for his roles in Bittoo Boss (2012), Humpty Sharma Ki Dulhania (2014), Bank Chor (2017), Badrinath Ki Dulhania (2017), Dil Bechara (2020) and Coolie No. 1 (2020) and the remake of the 2005 Telugu film Chatrapathi (2023).

== Early life ==
Vaid was born on 24 September, 1986 in Salem, Tamil Nadu into a lower middle-class Punjabi family.

== Career ==
Vaid has starred in a number of plays over the past 17 years. He started his career with school theatre, professionally acting for stage since 1997. He made his Bollywood debut in 2012 with Bittoo Boss. Early in his career, Sahil was recognized for portraying a variety of roles in the first online stand-up comedy show Jay Hind!. He then rose to prominence after starring in Humpty Sharma Ki Dulhania (2014). He was also seen in Bittoo Boss (2012), Badrinath Ki Dulhania (2017), Bank Chor (2017), Dil Bechara (2020), Coolie No. 1 (2020).

== Filmography ==
=== As actor ===
Year	Film	Role	Notes
2011	Ye Stupid Pyar	Simran	
2012	Bittoo Boss		
2014	Humpty Sharma Ki Dulhania	Poplu	
2014	Kaanchi: The Unbreakable	Sanjay Pathare	
2017	Badrinath Ki Dulhania	Somdev Mishra	
2017	Bank Chor	Jugnu	
2018	Baa Baaa Black Sheep		
2018	Manto		
2019	The Zoya Factor		
2019	Happi	Albert	released on ZEE5
2020	Dil Bechara	Jagdish Pandey (JP)	
2020	Coolie No. 1	Deepak Mechanic	
2021	Silence... Can You Hear It?	Inspector Amit Chauhan	
2021	Shershaah	Amit Sud (Sunny)	
2021	Satyameva Jayate 2	Gyaneswar Chaurasia	
2022	Babli Bouncer	Kukku	
2023	Chatrapathi		
2024	Silence 2: The Night Owl Bar Shootout	Inspector Amit Chauhan	
2025	The Hunt - The Rajiv Gandhi Assassination Case	Amit Verma	

=== As voice actor ===
==== Animated series ====
Year	Program title	Role	Language	Notes
2021-2025	The Legend of Hanuman	Vali (Season 1), Ahiravan (Season 3-5)	Hindi	Airing on Disney Plus Hotstar
2025	Kurukshetra: The Great War of Mahabharata	Krishna	Hindi	Streaming on Netflix India
2024 - 2025	Hazbin Hotel	Alastor	Hindi	streaming on prime video

==== Live action television series ====
Title	Actor	Character	Dub language	Original language	Number of episodes	Original airdate	Dubbed airdate	Notes
Titans	Drew Van Acker	Garth / Aqualad	Hindi	English		2018-Current	2019-current	
Narcos	Pedro Pascal	Javier Peña	Hindi	English	30(3 Seasons)	August 28, 2015	June 2018	
The King: Eternal Monarch	Lee Min-ho	Lee Gon	Hindi	Korean	16	2020	2021	

==== Live action films ====
===== Hollywood films =====
Film title	Actor	Character	Dub language	Original language	Original year release	Dub year release	Notes
Ant-Man	Paul Rudd	Scott Lang / Ant-Man	Hindi	English	2015	2015	
Captain America: Civil War	Paul Rudd	Scott Lang / Ant-Man	Hindi	English	2016	2016	
Ant-Man and the Wasp	Paul Rudd	Scott Lang / Ant-Man	Hindi	English	2018	2018	
Avengers: Endgame	Paul Rudd	Scott Lang / Ant-Man	Hindi	English	2019	2019	
Ant-Man and the Wasp: Quantumania	Paul Rudd	Scott Lang / Ant-Man	Hindi	English	2023	2023	
Teenage Mutant Ninja Turtles	Alan Ritchson	Raphael (voice)	Hindi	English	2014	2014	
Teenage Mutant Ninja Turtles: Out of the Shadows	Alan Ritchson	Raphael (voice)	Hindi	English	2016	2016	
The Hangover	Bradley Cooper	Philip "Phil" Wenneck	Hindi	English	2009	2009	
The Hangover Part II	Bradley Cooper	Philip "Phil" Wenneck	Hindi	English	2011	2011	
The Hangover Part III	Bradley Cooper	Philip "Phil" Wenneck	Hindi	English	2013	2013	
Abraham Lincoln: Vampire Hunter	Dominic Cooper	Henry Sturges	Hindi	English	2012	2012	
Fantastic Four	Toby Kebbell	Victor Von Doom / Doctor Doom	Hindi	English	2015	2015	
Everest	Jake Gyllenhaal	Scott Fischer	Hindi	English	2015	2015	
Edge of Tomorrow	Tom Cruise	Major William Cage	Hindi	English	2014	2014	
The Martian	Sebastian Stan	Dr. Chris Beck	Hindi	English	2015	2015	
Life of Pi	Rafe Spall	Yann Martel	Hindi	English	2012	2012	
Final Destination 5	Nicholas D'Agosto	Sam Lawton	Hindi	English	2011	2011	
Jack Reacher: Never Go Back	Tom Cruise	Jack Reacher	Hindi	English	2016	2017	
Beauty and the Beast	Dan Stevens	Beast	Hindi	English	2017	2017	
Kong: Skull Island	Tom Hiddleston	James Conrad	Hindi	English	2017	2017	
Deadpool	T.J. Miller	Weasel	Hindi	English	2016	2016	
Deadpool 2	T.J. Miller	Weasel	Hindi	English	2018	2018	
Kingsman: The Secret Service	Edward Holcroft	Charles "Charlie" Hesketh	Hindi	English	2014	2014	
Kingsman: The Golden Circle	Edward Holcroft	Charles "Charlie" Hesketh	Hindi	English	2017	2017	
The Social Network	Armie Hammer	Cameron Winklevoss and Tyler Winklevoss	Hindi	English	2010	2014	
Pain & Gain	Mark Wahlberg	Daniel Lugo	Hindi	English	2013	2017	
Jumanji: Welcome to the Jungle	Jack Black	Professor Sheldon "Shelly" Oberon	Hindi	English	2017	2017	
Jumanji: The Next Level	Jack Black	Professor Sheldon "Shelly" Oberon	Hindi	English	2019	2019	
Total Recall	Bokeem Woodbine	Harry	Hindi	English	2012	2012	
John Wick: Chapter 2	Keanu Reeves	John Wick	Hindi	English	2017	2017	
Mission: Impossible – Fallout	Simon Pegg	Benji Dunn	Hindi	English	2018	2018	
Rock of Ages	Tom Cruise	Stacee Jaxx	Hindi	English	2012	2012	
Triple Frontier	Pedro Pascal	Francisco "Catfish" Morales	Hindi	English	2019	2019	
The Batman	Paul Dano	Edward Nashton / Riddler	Hindi	English	2022	2022	

===== Indian films =====
Film title	Actor	Character	Dub language	Original language	Original year release	Dub year release	Notes
Power	Subbaraju	Rajeev	Hindi	Telugu	2014	2014	The Hindi dub was titled: "Power Unlimited".
Anjaan	Vidyut Jammwal	Chandru	Hindi	Tamil	2014	2016	The Hindi dub was titled: "Khatarnak Khiladi 2".
Yennai Arindhaal	Arun Vijay	Victor Manohar	Hindi	Tamil	2015	2016	The Hindi dub was titled: "Satyadev - The Fearless Cop".
Subrahmanyam for Sale	Ajay	Govind	Hindi	Telugu	2015	2016	The Hindi dub was titled: "Patel On Sale".
Jil	Harish Uthaman	ACP A. Parasuram	Hindi	Telugu	2015	2016	
Loafer	Varun Tej	Raja Murali	Hindi	Telugu	2015	2016	The Hindi dub was titled: "Loafer - The Hero".
Duvvada Jagannadham	Harish Uthaman	Sultan Basha	Hindi	Telugu	2017	2017	The Hindi dub was titled: "DJ".
Janatha Garage	Unni Mukundan	Raghava Sathyam	Hindi	Telugu	2016	2017	The Hindi dub was titled: "Janta Garage".
Bairavaa	Harish Uthaman	Prabha	Hindi	Tamil	2017	2017	The Hindi dub was titled: "Bhairava".
Katamarayudu	Ajay	Konda Babu (Ajay in Hindi version)	Hindi	Telugu	2017	2017	
Billa	Adithya Menon	Inspector Aditya	Hindi	Telugu	2009	2017	The Hindi dub was titled: "The Return of Rebel 2".
Pichaikkaran	Vijay Antony	Arul Selvakumar	Hindi	Tamil	2016	2017	The Hindi dub was titled: "Roadside Rowdy".
Gentleman	Nani	Gautham / Jayaram "Jai" Mullapudi	Hindi	Telugu	2016	2017	The Hindi dub was titled: "Jet Set Go".
Saagasam	Brahmaji	"Travel" Murthy	Hindi	Tamil	2016	2017	The Hindi dub was titled: "Jeene Nahi Doonga 2".
Nela Ticket	Subbaraju	Aditya's brother	Hindi	Telugu	2018	2019	
Sye Raa Narasimha Reddy	Vijay Sethupathi	Raja Pandi	Hindi	Telugu	2019	2019	
Velaikkaran	RJ Balaji	Sriram	Hindi	Tamil	2017	2019	The Hindi dub was titled: "Ghayal Khiladi".
Idhu Namma Aalu	Silambarasan	Shiva	Hindi	Tamil	2016	2020	The Hindi dub was titled: "Premam 2".
Ye Mantram Vesave	Udai Kiran	Sweet Guy	Hindi	Telugu	2018	2020	The Hindi dub was titled: "Pyar Ka Khel".
3	Sivakarthikeyan	Kumaran	Hindi	Tamil	2012	2020	
Siruthai	Rajiv Kanakala	Inspector Bharath	Hindi	Tamil	2011	2020	
Sathya	Sibi Sathyaraj	Sathya	Hindi	Tamil	2017	2020	
Kadhal Azhivathillai	Silambarasan	Simbhu	Hindi	Tamil	2002	2020	The Hindi dub was titled: "Daringbaaz Aashiq 3".
Thiruttu Payale	Jeevan	Manickam	Hindi	Tamil	2006	2020	The Hindi dub was titled: "The Digital Thief 2".
Agent Sai Srinivasa Athreya	Naveen Polishetty	Agent Sai Srinivasa "Seenu" Athreya	Hindi	Telugu	2019	2021	The Hindi dub was titled: "Agent Sai".
ABCD: American Born Confused Desi	Raja Chembolu	Barghav	Hindi	Telugu	2019	2021	
Pushpa: The Rise	Jagadeesh Pratap Bandari	Kesava; Also Narrator	Hindi	Telugu	2021	2021	
Golimaar	Shawar Ali	Talwar	Hindustani	Telugu	2010	2021	
Aruvam	Sathish	Sorimuthu (Muthu) (Saxena in Hindi version)	Hindi	Telugu	2019	2021	The Hindi dub was titled: "Be Shakal".
Ala Vaikunthapurramuloo	Navdeep	HR Shekhar	Hindi	Telugu	2020	2022	
HIT: The First Case	Maganti Srinath	Abhilash	Hindi	Telugu	2020	2022	

==== Animated films ====
Film title	Original voice	Character	Dub language	Original language	Original year release	Dub year release
The Lego Movie	Will Ferrell	Lord Business	Hindi	English	2014	2014
The Angry Birds Movie	Josh Gad	Chuck	Hindi	English	2016	2016
The Angry Birds Movie 2	Josh Gad	Chuck	Hindi	English	2019	2019
Baahubali: The Eternal War – Part 1	Unknown	Indra	Hindi	Telugu	2027	2027

==== Animated television series ====
Series title	Original voice	Character	Dub language	Original language	Original year release	Dub year release	Notes
Star Wars: Visions	—N/a	Maghadi, Scavenger	—N/a	English	2023	—N/a	Episode: "The Bandits of Golak"
Batman: Caped Crusader		Anton	Hindi	English	August 1,2024	August 1, 2024	
The Legend of Hanuman	Himself	Vali Ahiravana	Hindi	Hindi	2021-2024	2021-2024	
