= Bank Chor =

2017 Indian film by Bumpy

- Theatrical release poster
- Directed by: Bumpy
- Screenplay by: Baljeet Singh Marwah; Bumpy; Omkar Sane; Ishita Moitra
- Dialogues by: Ishita Moitra
- Story by: Baljeet Singh Marwah; Bumpy
- Produced by: Ashish Patil
- Starring: Riteish Deshmukh; Vivek Oberoi; Rhea Chakraborty; Sahil Vaid; Bhuvan Arora; Vikram Thappa
- Cinematography: Adil Afsar
- Edited by: Saurabh Kulkarni
- Music by: Shri Shriram; Kailash Kher; Rochak Kohli; Shamir Tandon; Baba Sehgal
- Production company: Y-Films
- Distributed by: Yash Raj Films
- Release date: 16 June 2017
- Running time: 120 minutes
- Country: India
- Language: Hindi
- Budget: ₹15 crore
- Box office: ₹9.85 crores

Bank Chor (transl. Bank robber) is a 2017 Indian Hindi-language black comedy film directed by Bumpy, written by Baljeet Singh Marwah and produced by Ashish Patil under the banner Y-Films. The film stars Riteish Deshmukh, Vivek Oberoi, Rhea Chakraborty, Sahil Vaid, Bhuvan Arora, and Vikram Thapa.

The film was released on 16 June 2017.

== Plot ==
Champak Chandrakant Chiplunkar (Riteish Deshmukh), a Marathi man who adheres to Vaastu principles, plans to rob a bank in Mumbai with the help of his friends Genda (Vikram Thapa) and Gulab (Bhuvan Arora). Disguised as a sadhu, Champak enters the bank with his accomplices, who wear elephant and horse masks. Armed, they overpower the security guards and take control of the premises. However, the poorly executed robbery quickly goes awry, leaving them with twenty-eight hostages: seventeen men and eleven women, including bank employees and customers, a nervous housewife, a sharp-tongued female teller, a hyperactive chef, the Rapper (Baba Sehgal) and Jugnu (Sahil), who claims to be an undercover police officer from Faizabad.

The robbers restrain the hostages with zip ties and force the bank manager to open the vault. Meanwhile, Champak invents stories about his supposedly respectable, affluent background to explain his lack of fortune. The situation escalates when Amjad Khan (Vivek Oberoi), a ruthless CBI officer known for his shoot-first, ask-questions-later approach, takes charge. He gives the robbers one hour to surrender, threatening to use force regardless of the hostages' safety.

Outside, crime reporter Gayatri Ganguly, nicknamed Gaga (Rhea Chakraborty), leads the media frenzy. She idolises Arnab Goswami. Meanwhile, the Minister of Home Affairs becomes involved because a disc inside the bank contains compromising information that could destroy his political career.

Champak and his accomplices eventually decide to abandon the robbery and release the hostages. However, just as the captives prepare to leave, Jugnu reveals that he is a ruthless robber working for the Home Minister to retrieve the disc. He and his accomplices seize control of the bank, shoot and seriously injure an elderly male hostage, and take Champak and his friends captive. The original robbers are forced to assist the new gang, while the remaining twenty-seven employees and customers are held at gunpoint and ordered to kneel with their hands behind their heads.

Amjad realises that Champak is no longer the principal threat, but the corrupt Home Minister intervenes, transferring the investigation from the CBI to the Mumbai police to protect Jugnu and his operation. During a visit to verify the hostages' safety, Amjad finds them confined to a back room. Jugnu instructs Champak to maintain the pretence that he is the original robber and that Jugnu remains a hostage. Champak offers to let Amjad take the injured elderly man for medical treatment. After the officer leaves, Jugnu assaults Champak for allowing the hostage to go, terrifying the others.

Eventually, Champak and his accomplices outwit Jugnu and his gang, freeing all the hostages and helping the women escape first. The released captives embrace the three men as heroes, and Jugnu is captured. The disc's contents become public, exposing the Home Minister's corruption.

The final revelation is that Champak, Genda and Gulab are experienced bank robbers who have orchestrated the entire operation to expose the Home Minister, who murdered his journalist partner while the latter was gathering evidence against him. The trio also escaped with the money. Amjad acknowledges that they are the only robbers whose intentions he was unable to decipher.

== Cast ==
- Riteish Deshmukh as Champak
- Vivek Oberoi as CBI Officer Amjad Khan
- Rhea Chakraborty as Gayatri Ganguly
- Sahil Vaid as Jugnu
- Bhuvan Arora as Gulab
- Vikram Thapa as Genda
- Vikram Gokhale as Shashank Thakur
- Upendra Limaye as Home Minister Dongarvide
- Naveen Kaushik as Ashutosh Sharma
- Sandesh Kulkarni as ACP Akhilesh Aane
- Kavish Majumdar as Mukesh
- Harpal Singh Sokhi as Fake Sardar Hostage
- Baba Sehgal as himself (special appearance)

== Soundtrack ==
The soundtrack was released on 24 May 2017 by YRF Music.

No.	Title	Lyrics	Music	Singer(s)	Length
1.	"Hum Hain Bank Chor"	Kailash Kher, Ambili	Kailash Kher	Kailash Kher, Ambili	3:34
2.	"Tashreef"	Adheesh Verma	Rochak Kohli	Rochak Kohli	3:12
3.	"BC Rap Knockout: Mumbai vs Delhi"	Varun Likhate	Shamir Tandon	Naezy, Pardhaan	3:47
4.	"Jai Baba Bank Chor"	Gautam Govind Sharma	Rochak Kohli	Nakash Aziz	2:37
5.	"Tashreef Unplugged (Cups Version)"	Adheesh Verma	Rochak Kohli	Rochak Kohli	3:07
6.	"Mela (The Bank Chor Theme)"			Instrumental	5:32
7.	"Bae, Baba aur Bank Chor"	Baba Sehgal	Baba Sehgal	Baba Sehgal	3:22
Total length:					25:06

== Reception ==
Bollywood Hungama gave 1.5/5 stars, writing "Bank Chor is a damp squib right from the word go. It does not have any potential to score". Nihit Bhave of The Times of India gave 2.5/5 stars, writing "A better plan of action and a few dry runs with the script would have ensured a product to bank on". Firstpost wrote "Despite its many misses, Bank Chor has more verve. Whatever little progress Bumpy has made as a filmmaker, however, is far outweighed by the insidious messaging of this film which cashes in on the prejudices that wrack Indian society today below a mask of good intentions, comedy and thrills". Raja Sen of NDTV wrote "Riteish Deshmukh, Vivek Oberoi's film starts off being about blank chors, and ends up a bank bore". Sweta Kaushal of The Hindustan Times gave 1/5 stars, writing "This is an aspiring comic thriller that fails miserably at being either. Even brilliant actor Riteish Deshmukh and his gang of "stupid thieves" fail to rise above the lame storyline and its pathetic comic sense".
