= Silence 2: The Night Owl Bar Shootout =

2024 Indian murder mystery film

- Official release poster
- Directed by: Aban Bharucha Deohans
- Written by: Aban Bharucha Deohans
- Produced by: Zee Studios; Kiran Deohans
- Starring: Manoj Bajpayee; Prachi Desai; Sahil Vaid; Vaquar Shaikh
- Cinematography: Pooja Gupte
- Edited by: Sandeep Kumar Sethy
- Music by: Gaurav Godkhindi
- Production companies: Zee Studios; Candid Creations
- Distributed by: ZEE5
- Release date: 16 April 2024
- Running time: 142 minutes
- Country: India
- Language: Hindi

Silence 2: The Night Owl Bar Shootout is a 2024 Indian Hindi-language mystery thriller film directed by Aban Bharucha Deohans. The film stars Manoj Bajpayee, Prachi Desai and Parul Gulati (in her Hindi film debut) in lead roles. It is the sequel to Silence...Can You Hear It? (2021).

The film was released on ZEE5 on 16 April 2024.

== Plot ==
ACP Avinash Verma and his team are assigned a case of a mass shootout that happened at a club named Night Owl Bar in Mumbai. As the team works on the case they realise there is something much bigger and darker at play.

== Cast ==
- Manoj Bajpayee as ACP Avinash Verma
- Prachi Desai as Inspector Sanjana Bhatia
- Parul Gulati as Aarti
- Sahil Vaid as inspector Amit Chauhan
- Vaquar Shaikh as Inspector Raj Gupta
- Dinker Sharma as Arjun Chouhan
- Chetan Sharma as Rizwan
- Randheer Rai as Gaurav
- Ankit Bhardwaj as Sunny
- Shruti Bapna as Inspector Jaya
- Surbhi Rohra as Azma Khan
- Ishika Gagneja as Amisha
- Dave Deohans as Winston
- Manuj Bhaskar as Commissioner of Police Mayank Sharma
- Mahi Jain as Rimjim
- Neena Kulkarni as Amisha's Dadi

== Production ==
Principal photography commenced in South Mumbai in July 2023.

== Marketing ==
The film was formally announced by ZEE5 in March 2023 when the teaser was released. The trailer of the film was released on April 3, 2024.

As a part of the promotions of the film, Manoj Bajpayee hit the streets of Lucknow in Uttar Pradesh.

== Release ==
The film was released on the streaming platform ZEE5 on 16 April 2024.

== Reception ==
Writing for NDTV, Saibal Chatterjee praised Manoj Bajpayee's work stating, "Able to sustain itself through its complement of twists and turns thanks to the solidity that Manoj Bajpayee lends the film."

Bollywood Hungama critic rated 2.5 out of 5 stars and wrote "Despite being an intriguing murder mystery Silence 2: The Night Owl Bar Shootout suffers due to the long length and certain loose ends."

Mayur Sanap of Rediff.com rated 1/5 stars and observed "Towards the end of the film, when one character exclaims, 'What a crazy case!' your sentiments feel validated."

The Times of India rated the film three out of five stars and wrote that "Overall, in an otherwise average thriller, it is Manoj Bapayee who powers through his solid, assured act". A critic from News18 gave the film the same rating and wrote that "Silence 2 definitely deserves a watch if you like murder mysteries. And as always, Manoj Bajpayee is at his finest. It’s worth a watch despite the flaws". A critic from TimesNow gave the film the same rating and wrote that "there was real potential and promise in Silence 2: The Night Owl Bar Shootout to build something interesting. But the red herrings grow tiresome and the final reveal, in which the antagonist basically reveal all their intentions, drags the story and the film by a good 20 minutes or so".

A critic from Pinkvilla rated the film two out of five stars and wrote that "Silence 2 is a long and tiring watch that simply fails to connect. The performances also fail to match the level of a no-nonsense investigative-thriller". A critic from Outlook rated the film one-and-a-half out of five stars and wrote that "The only good part about Silence 2: The Night Owl Bar Shootout is the camera work. The camera work is smooth, and it keeps your attention in this poorly written whodunit". In a review for India Today, Zinia Bandyopadhyay wrote that, in particular because of its dialogues, the film "fails to impress as a crime thriller despite its potential". Arjun Agarwal, of Medium, stated, "The film throws some twists and turns your way, some predictable, some genuinely surprising. There’s a sense of wanting to be constantly surprised, but a few reveals lack the punch needed to leave you gasping."
