= Nav Bajwa =

Indian actor

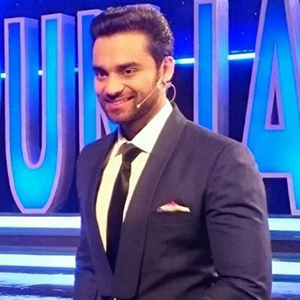
- Born: Navjot Singh Bajwa; Patiala, Punjab
- Occupations: Actor, director, writer, singer
- Years active: 2007–present
- Parent(s): G. S. Bajwa (father); Kulwant Bajwa (mother)

Nav Bajwa (born 26 September 1989) is an Indian film actor, director, writer and singer in Punjabi cinema. Bajwa won the dance show Aja Nach Le by MH1 in 2007 and made his acting debut with Pure Punjabi (2012). He has appeared in 18 films as lead actor. His directorial debut was with Raduaa (2018). He made his singing debut with the track "Badmashi"(2019) with music by DJ FLOW.

== Personal life ==
Nav Bajwa was born to a Punjabi family in Patiala, India and is also a commercial pilot. His father is a retired Indian Air Force personnel. His sister is a gymnast.

== Filmography ==
Year	Movie	Role	Language
2012	Pure Punjabi	VJ	Punjabi
2013	Sadi Gali Aya Karo	Bhupinder Singh	Punjabi
2013	Hashi Kannar Iti Kotha	Rahul	Bengali
2014	Fateh	Fateh	Punjabi
2015	The Mastermind Jinda Sukha	Harjinder Singh Jinda	Punjabi
2016	Kuknoos	Karman	Punjabi
2017	Kirdar E Sardar	Fateh	Punjabi
2018	Raduaa	Starring and directing	Punjabi
2019	Ishqaa	Rajdeep	Punjabi
2019	Kitty Party	Sunny	Punjabi

|- |2021 | | "TERE MERE NAI NIBHNI" ||HAPPY|| PUNJABI https://www.imdb.com/title/tt15338704/ |- |2022 | | "BHOOT UNCLE TUSI GREAT HO" ||RAJ|| PUNJABI https://www.spotboye.com/pollywood/pollywood-news/bhoot-uncle-tusi-great-ho-actor-nav-bajwa-shares-shooting-pics-from-the-set/5fb398dcaafb3d5f2f64580f |- ||2023 | | "DIL HONA CHAHIDA JAWAN" ||VICKY|| PUNJABI https://www.imdb.com/title/tt8798318/ |- ||2024 | | "[RADUAA RETURNS]]" ||NAV|| PUNJABI https://timesofindia.indiatimes.com/entertainment/punjabi/movie-details/raduaa-returns/movieshow/115767914.cms |- ||2025| | "MADHANIYAN" ||KARAN|| PUNJABI https://timesofindia.indiatimes.com/entertainment/punjabi/movie-details/madhaniyan/movieshow/124717750.cms |- ||2026 | | "ADVOCATE CHAUHAN" ||CHAUHAN|| PUNJABI https://www.gtcpunjabi.com/trending-now/nav-bajwa-and-himanshi-khurana-to-star-in-new-film-advocate-chauhan-release-date-revealed-2276

== Awards and nominations ==
Year	Film / Show	Award Ceremony	Category	Result
2007	Aja Nach Le	MH1	Best Performer	Won
2014	Fateh	PTC Punjabi Film Awards	Best Actor	Nominated
2019	Raduaa	PTC Punjabi Film Awards	Best Debut Director	Nominated

== Songs ==
Song name	Lyrics	Music	Singer
Badmashi	Pamma Noorwala	DJ Flom	Nav Bajwa

== Social causes ==
He is a member of a non-governmental organisation (NGO) from Chandigarh working for the betterment of mentally disabled people. He gives and organizes charity shows for noble causes as well.
