= Prachi Desai =

Indian actress (born 1988)

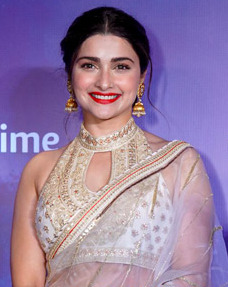
- Desai in 2023
- Born: 12 September 1988 (age 38); Valsad, Gujarat, India
- Education: Sinhagad College, Pune
- Occupation: Actress
- Years active: 2006–present

Prachi Desai (born 12 September 1988), is an Indian actress who primarily works in Hindi films and television. Desai is a recipient of several accolades including an IIFA Award and four Indian Telly Awards, as well as two Filmfare Awards nominations.

Desai marked her acting debut with the successful television drama Kasamh Se (2006–2008). In 2007, she emerged as the winner of Jhalak Dikhhla Jaa 2. Following this, Desai made her film debut with Rock On!! (2008), receiving the Filmfare Award for Best Female Debut nomination. Desai received the IIFA Award for Best Supporting Actress for her portrayal of a gangster's lover in Once Upon a Time in Mumbaai (2010). After appearing in the action comedy Bol Bachchan (2012), which remains her biggest commercial success, the romantic comedy I, Me Aur Main (2013) and the biographical sports drama Azhar (2016), she took a break from acting.

Desai returned to films in 2021 with the thriller Silence... Can You Hear It? and then expanded to web with the Telugu series Dhootha (2023). Alongside her acting career, Desai is a celebrity endorser for brands and products.

== Early life ==
Desai was born on 12 September 1988 in Valsad, Gujarat, to Niranjan Desai and Ameeta Desai in a Hindu family. She has one sister named Esha Desai. She studied in St. Joseph Convent School, Panchgani and completed her schooling until ninth grade in Surat. She studied at Sinhagad College, Vadgaon, Pune.

== Career ==
=== Television career and breakthrough (2006-2008) ===
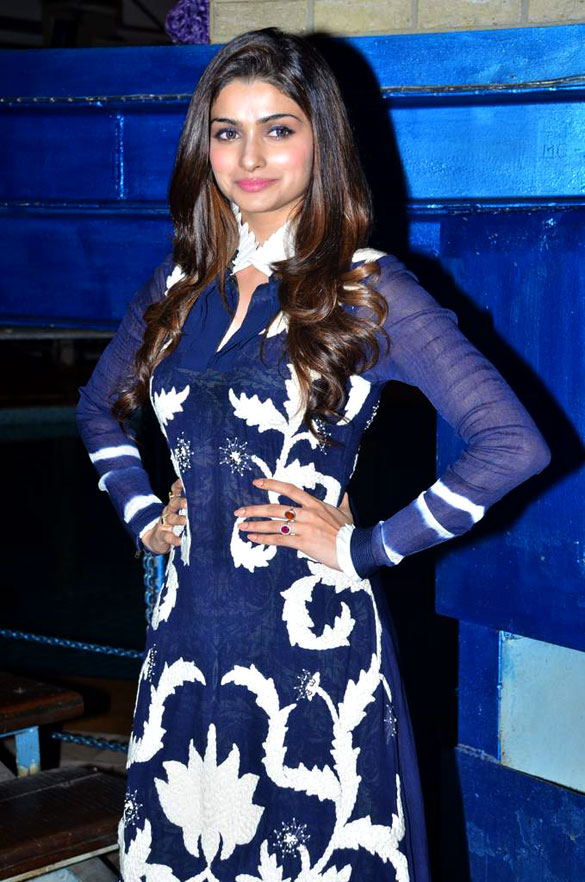
Desai on Taarak Mehta Ka Ooltah Chashmah's set

In 2006, Desai got selected to play the lead role in Ekta Kapoor's television drama, Kasamh Se. Desai played Bani Dixit Walia, opposite Ram Kapoor. In her acting debut, Desai won her praises and earned several awards, including the Indian Telly Award for Best Actress in a Lead Role. In the same show, she also played Anamika Dixit Randheria opposite Sumeet Vyas.

In 2007, Desai entered Jhalak Dikhhla Jaa, the Indian version of BBC Strictly Come Dancing with choreographer Deepak Singh. Desai was eliminated on 10 November 2007, but entered the contest again via a wildcard entry and ultimately won the competition. Desai also appeared in two episodes of the Star Plus television series Kasauti Zindagi Ki in a cameo. She portrayed a student at Prerna's school.

=== Expansion to films and success (2008-2017) ===
Desai then made the transition to the film industry in 2008. She made her film debut with Rock On!! (2008), directed by Abhishek Kapoor, where she played Sakshi, a band singer wife opposite Farhan Akhtar. Desai had to leave Kasamh Se to star in Rock On. The film earned her a nomination for the Filmfare Award for Best Female Debut. In his review, Rajeev Masand stated, "Desai, saddled with what I think is the film's trickiest role, comes off unscathed because she's an actor who oozes warmth." Next year, she played Prachi opposite Tusshar Kapoor in Life Partner, a box office average.

Desai's career marked a significant turning point in 2010, when she appeared in Once Upon a Time in Mumbaai. The film saw her play Mumtaz, a character based on Mehjabin Shaikh, opposite Emraan Hashmi. It emerged a box office success and earned her a nomination for the Filmfare Award for Best Supporting Actress and won the IIFA Award for Best Supporting Actress. Kaveree Bamzai from India Today opined, "Prachi Desai as Shoaib's girlfriend, is suitably tremulous and pleading."

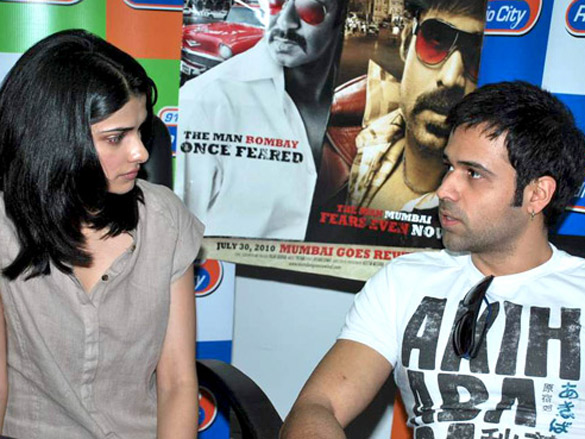
Desai promoting Once Upon a Time in Mumbaai in 2010

In 2012, she appeared in Teri Meri Kahaani as Radhika, opposite Shahid Kapoor. Taran Adarsh found her cameo appearance to be "sparkling". Desai then played Radhika, an educated modern girl in Bol Bachchan, opposite Abhishek Bachchan. The film proved to be Desai's biggest box office success until date. Devesh Sharma of Filmfare noted, "Prachi Desai is reduced to sisterly bits".

Desai had two releases in 2013. She first played a stylist Gauri, in I, Me Aur Main, opposite John Abraham. Nishi Tiwar of Rediff.com said that Desai went "overboard" in her portrayal of a girl-next-door. She next appeared opposite Sanjay Dutt, in Policegiri. The film received negative reviews and Sarit Ray of Hindustan Times found her role to be "irrelevant". In 2014, Desai appeared in a special number for Ek Villain, in a song named "Awari".

Post a small hiatus, Desai played former cricket captain Mohammad Azharuddin's wife, Naureen in his biopic film, Azhar opposite Emraan Hashmi. The film emerged a commercial failure, but Anna MM Vetticad of Firstpost found her Naureen to be "controlled" and her heartbreak "believable". In the same year, Desai reprised Sakshi, opposite Farhan Akhtar in Rock On 2, a sequel to Rock On!!. In 2017, Desai played a robot in the short film Carbon: The Story of Tomorrow opposite Jackky Bhagnani.

=== Hiatus, return and streaming projects (2017-present) ===
In 2021, Desai returned to films after a break of four years with Silence... Can You Hear It?, where she played a police inspector Sanjana alongside Manoj Bajpai. That year, she appeared in a music video, Rihaee with Rohit Khandelwal. The song was well appreciated by the audience.

Desai then played, Dr.Ranjana, a psychiatrist in the 2022 film, Forensic. Pragati Awasthi of WION was appreciative of Desai's decent portrayal of a psychiatrist. In 2023, Desai appeared alongside Naga Chaitanya, in Dhootha , playing his PA, Amrutha. The series released in Telugu, marked her web debut. Neeshita Nyayapati of Hindustan Times noted, "Prachi get a character that is anything but run-of-the-mill, even then she sink her teeth into it and does a good job."

In 2024, Desai reprised Inspector Sanjana in Silence 2: The Night Owl Bar Shootout, sequel to the 2021 film. Saibal Chatterjee opined, "Prachi Desai manages to make the most of the limited bandwidth accorded to her." Desai is committed to star as a lead actress in the dark fantasy movie - Kosha, which is directed by Amman Advaita and produced by Abhay Raj Kanwar.

== In the media ==
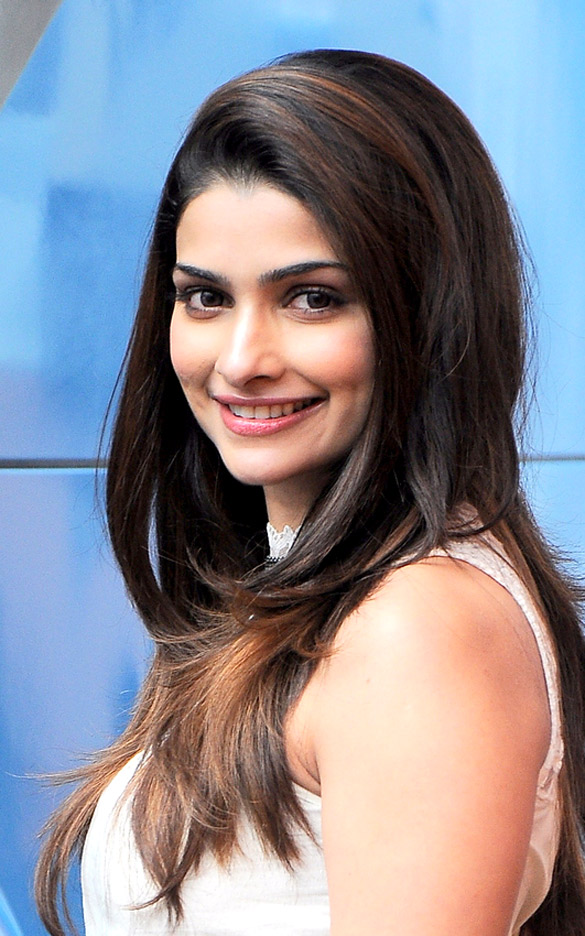
Desai promoting her film Bol Bachchan, in 2012

Post her debut with Kasamh Se, Rediff.com placed her fourth in its "Top TV stars of 2006" list. Desai was placed 32nd in The Times of India's Most Desirable Woman list. Desai is an endorser, spokesperson and brand ambassador of Goa Tourism and Neutrogena products in India. Desai is also a celebrity endorser for brands such as Lux Lyra, Relaxo, and Gillette. In 2016, Desai refused to be a part of an advertisement in Pakistan. Desai shared about her casting couch experience in an interview in 2021.

== Filmography ==
Key
†	Denotes films that have not yet been released

=== Films ===
Years	Title	Role	Notes	Ref.
2007	Big Brother		Debut film	
2008	Rock On!!	Sakshi Shroff		
2009	Life Partner	Prachi Jadeja Patel		
2010	Once Upon a Time in Mumbaai	Mumtaz		
2012	Bol Bachchan	Radhika Raghuvanshi		
2013	I, Me Aur Main	Gauri Dandekar		
2013	Policegiri	Sehar Al Ameri		
2014	Ek Villain	Dancer	Special appearance in song "Awari"	
2016	Azhar	Naureen Azhar		
2016	Rock On 2	Sakshi Shroff		
2017	Carbon: The Story of Tomorrow	Pari	Short film	
2021	Silence... Can You Hear It?	Inspector Sanjana Bhatia		
2022	Forensic	Dr. Ranjana / Shashi Gupta		
2024	Silence 2: The Night Owl Bar Shootout	Inspector Sanjana Bhatia		
TBA	Kosha †	Sonia Sawant	Delayed	

=== Television ===
Years	Title	Role	Notes	Ref.
2006–2008	Kasamh Se	Bani Dixit Walia / Anamika Dixit Randheria		
2007	Kasautii Zindagii Kay	Prachi Chauhan		
2007	Jhalak Dikhhla Jaa 2	Contestant	Winner	
2010	CID	Herself	Guest appearance	
2012	Taarak Mehta Ka Ooltah Chashmah	Herself	Guest appearance	
2016	Naagin	Herself	Guest appearance	
2023	Dhootha	Amrutha	Telugu series	

=== Music video appearances ===
Years	Title	Singer	Role	Ref.
2021	"Rihaee"	Yasser Desai	Preeti	

== Awards and nominations ==
Year	Award	Category	Work	Result	Ref.
2006	Indian Telly Awards	Best Fresh New Face (Female)	Kasamh Se	Won	
2006	Indian Telly Awards	Best Onscreen Couple (Shared with Ram Kapoor)	Kasamh Se	Won	
2007	Indian Telly Awards	Best Actress in a Lead Role	Kasamh Se	Won	
2008	Indian Telly Awards	Special Recommendation	Kasamh Se	Won	
2009	Screen Awards	Most Promising Newcomer – Female	Rock On!!	Nominated	
2009	Stardust Awards	Superstar of Tomorrow – Female	Rock On!!	Nominated	
2009	International Indian Film Academy Awards	Star Debut of the Year – Female	Rock On!!	Nominated	
2009	Anandalok Puraskar Awards	Best Actress (Hindi)	Rock On!!	Won	
2009	Filmfare Awards	Best Female Debut	Rock On!!	Nominated	
2011	Filmfare Awards	Best Supporting Actress	Once Upon a Time in Mumbaai	Nominated	
2011	International Indian Film Academy Awards	Best Supporting Actress	Once Upon a Time in Mumbaai	Won	
2011	Producers Guild Film Awards	Best Actress in a Supporting Role	Once Upon a Time in Mumbaai	Won	
2011	Screen Awards	Best Supporting Actress	Once Upon a Time in Mumbaai	Nominated	
2011	Zee Cine Awards	Best Actor in a Supporting Role – Female	Once Upon a Time in Mumbaai	Won	
2011	Stardust Awards	Best Actress in an Ensemble Cast	Once Upon a Time in Mumbaai	Won	
2013	Stardust Awards	Best Breakthrough Performance – Female	Bol Bachchan	Nominated	
2023	Iconic Gold Awards	Best Actress in a Negative Role – OTT	Forensic	Won	
