= Vaquar Shaikh =

Indian television actor

- Born: Jalgaon, Maharashtra, India
- Occupation: Actor
- Years active: 1993–present

Vaquar Shaikh (born 9 February) is an Indian television actor. He played Rashid Ahmed Khan in Qubool Hai and has appeared in serials like Justujoo and Pradhanmantri.

== Career ==
Vaquar acted in Akbar Khan's Taj Mahal: An Eternal Love Story (2005), in which he played the role of Dara Shikoh, and also appeared in two digital films - Manzar and Koyi Gawah Nahin. He was seen on colors TV in the show Vidya as the lead antagonist, Nanku Singh, a deadly villain who ruled the entire village and misused his power. The show concluded in 2020. He hails from Jalgaon, Maharashtra.

Since December 2025, he has been playing Parvez in Colors TV's Seher - Hone Ko Hai.

== Filmography ==
Year	Film	Role	Notes
2005	Taj Mahal: An Eternal Love Story	Dara Shikoh	
2010	Mitti	Lalli Brar	
2016	Sarbjit	Jailor	
2021	Silence... Can You Hear It?	Inspector Raj Gupta	
2024	Silence 2: The Night Owl Bar Shootout	Inspector Raj Gupta	

=== Television ===
Year	Serial	Role	Notes
1994	Chandrakanta		
	V.I.J.A.Y.		
1995–2001	Aahat	Inspector Arjun	Episode 70, 71
1995–2001	Aahat	Dharam	Episode 88, 89
1995–2001	Aahat	Kabzaa	Episode 186, 187
1995–2001	Aahat	Shakti	Episode 106, 107
1997	Mahayodha	Durjan	
1997–1998	Vishwaas	Raj	
1998	C.I.D.	Inspector Jeet	Episode 13 & Episode 14
1998	Saaya	Arnav Nanda	
1999–2000	Om Namah Shivay	Lankeshwar Dashanan Ravan	
1998–2003	Heena	Akram	
2001–2002	Jannat		
2001–2002	Justujoo	Satish	
2001–2003	Sarhadein	Rajesh	
2003–2004	Saara Akaash	Mushtaq Ali (Red Dragon)	
2006–2007	Betiyaan Apni Yaa Paraaya Dhan	Chand's Husband	
2006–2007	Solhah Singaarr	Shantanu Bharadwaj	
2007	Veeranwali	Kushal	
2010	Woh Rehne Waali Mehlon Ki	Shekhar Agarwal	
2011	Shobha Somnath Ki	Puru	
2012	Dil Se Di Dua... Saubhagyavati Bhava?	Shekhawat	
2012–2014	Qubool Hai	Rashid Ahmed Khan	
2013	Pradhanmantri	Chandra Shekhar	
2013	Saraswatichandra	Rudrapratap Rathore	
2015	Savdhaan India	Inspector Anil Yadav	Episode 21–25
2019–2020	Vidya	Nanku Singh	
2022	Jai Bharati		
2024	Anupamaa	Yashdeep "Deepu" Dhillon	
2025–2026	Seher – Hone Ko Hai	Parvez Baig	

=== Web series ===
Year	Show	Role	Channel	Notes
2021	Qubool Hai 2.0	Rashid	ZEE5	
