= Fateh (2014 film) =

- Theatrical release poster
- Directed by: Jaspreet Rajan
- Written by: Jaspreet Rajan
- Screenplay by: Gurminder Singh Samad
- Produced by: Jyotdeep Singh & Munjan Preet Singh
- Starring: Nav Bajwa; Samiksha Singh; Gurpreet Ghuggi
- Cinematography: Basha Lal
- Edited by: Biren Mohanty
- Music by: Kuljit Singh; Tigerstyle
- Production company: Big Vision Films Pvt. Ltd.
- Release date: 7 March 2014
- Running time: 150 minutes
- Country: India
- Language: Punjabi

Fateh is an adventure film. The film starring Nav Bajwa, Samiksha Singh, Yaad Grewal, Supreet Bedi, Puneet Issar, Navneet Nishan, Deep Dhillon, Shivendra Mahal, Gurpreet Ghuggi and Karamjit Anmol, is the first Punjabi film to be made on martial arts. It is a film on enduring Punjabi culture depicting sword and stick art that teaches that perseverance can lead to triumph.

== Cast ==
- Nav Bajwa as Fateh Singh
- Sameksha Singh as Sehaj
- Yaad Grewal as Sangram
- Puneet Issar as Pratap Singh
- Deep Dhillon as Jarnail Sing
- Shavindra Mahal
- Gurpreet Ghuggi as Taareef
- Karamjit Anmol as Besti
- Supreet Bedi as Noor

== Crew ==
- Written & Directed by - Jaspreet Rajan
- Producers - Jyotdeep Singh & Munjan Preet Singh
- Creative Director - Gurdeep Singh
- Executive Producers - Gurdeep Singh / R.P. Singh
- Dialogues - Gurminder Singh Samad & Parveen Kumar
- Screenplay - Gurminder Singh Samad
- Dop - Basha Lal
- Editor - Biren Mohanty
- Music - Kuljit Singh Studio FMbox 98/9 Centraltown Jalandhar & Tigerstyle (U.K)
- Lyrics - Raj Kakra, Kashmir Thakarwal
- Singers - Mika Singh, Lehmber Hussainpuri, Jasbir Jassi, Kavita Seth, Feroz Khan, Karamjit Anmol, Raja Hasan

== Awards ==
PTC Punjabi Film Awards 2015

Nominated for

- PTC Punjabi Film Award for Best Story - Jaspreet Rajan
- PTC Punjabi Film Award for Best Lyricist for Khoon Di Fitrat
- PTC Punjabi Film Award for Best Playback Singer (Female) - Kavita Seth for Ishqa Ishqa
- PTC Punjabi Film Award for Best Playback Singer (Male) - Raja Hasan for Khoon Di Fitrat
- PTC Punjabi Film Award for Best Performance in a Negative Role - Yaad Grewal
- PTC Punjabi Film Award for Best Supporting Actor - Puneet Issar
- PTC Punjabi Film Award for Best Debut Female - Supreet Bedi
- PTC Punjabi Film Award for Best Debut Director - Jaspreet Rajan
- PTC Punjabi Film Award for Best Actor - Nav Bajwa
