= Peepli =

Peepli is a village in Jhunjhunu District, in the state of Rajasthan in India. It is close to the state of Haryana and the Bhiwani district. It is located about 60 km away from the Jhunjhunu district and 22 km away from Pilani.

As of 2011, Peepli had a population of 3787.
