= Amardeep Singh Gill =

Indian director, screenwriter and lyricist (born 1968)

- ਅਮਰਦੀਪ ਸਿੰਘ ਗਿੱਲ
- Born: 8 October 1968 (age 58); Bathinda, Punjab, India
- Other name: Amardeep Gill
- Citizenship: India
- Education: Punjabi University
- Occupations: Director; screenwriter; producer; lyricist; poet; author
- Years active: 1996-present
- Known for: Film director and lyricist
- Notable work: Jora 10 Numbaria
- Awards: Best Debut Director in Punjabi Cinema; Best Lyricist in Punjabi Cinema
- Website: Amardeep Singh Gill on Instagram

Signature
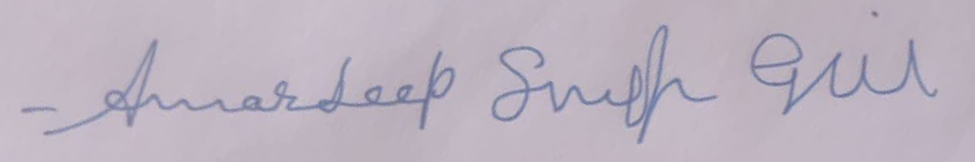

Amardeep Singh Gill (born 8 October 1968) is an Indian director, screenwriter, producer and lyricist associated with Punjabi cinema and Punjabi music.

== Early life ==
Gill was born on 8 October 1968, to a Jatt-Sikh family in Bathinda, Punjab, but his native village is Gholia Kalan in the Moga district. He has a master's degree in Punjabi from Punjabi University.

== Career ==
Gill started his career as a lyricist with hit songs such as Sili Sili Hawa, Je Mille Oh Kudi, Hanju, Socha Vich Tu, Ki Beeti Sade Nal, and Pyar Kar Ke.

In 2014, he directed his first short film, Sutta Naag. Afterwards, he worked as a screenwriter and lyricist in the movie Yoddha: The Warrior.

In 2017, he directed his first film Jora 10 Numbaria which starred Deep Sidhu, Dharmendra, Mukul Dev, Sardar Sohi and Mukesh Tiwari.

== Filmography ==
Year	Title	Credited as						Notes
Year	Title	Film director	Lyricist	Film producer	Story	Screenplay	Dialogues	Notes
2010	Ik Kudi Punjab Di	No	Yes	No	No	No	No	
2014	Sutta Naag	Yes	Yes	Yes	Yes	Yes	Yes	Short Film
2014	Yoddha: The Warrior	No	Yes	No	Yes	Yes	Yes	
2016	Khoon	Yes	Yes	Yes	Yes	Yes	Yes	Short Film
2017	Jora 10 Numbaria	Yes	Yes	Yes	Yes	Yes	Yes	Debut Film
2017	Toofan Singh (film)	No	Yes	No	No	No	No	
2018	Subedar Joginder Singh (film)	No	Yes	No	No	No	No	
2019	Raat	Yes	Yes	Yes	Yes	Yes	Yes	PTC Punjabi Box Office's Film
2020	Jora: The Second Chapter	Yes	Yes	Yes	Yes	Yes	Yes	
2021	Marjaney	Yes	Yes	No	Yes	Yes	Yes	
2023	Daaro	Yes	Yes	Yes	Yes	Yes	Yes	First web series (Filming)
2023	Bedava	Yes	Yes	Yes	Yes	Yes	Yes	Post-production

== Discography ==
=== Selected Songs as Lyricist only ===
Year	Track	Singer	Label	Notes
1996	Kudiyan Ta Kudiyan	Hans Raj Hans	Tips Industries	
1998	Eh Punjab Te Oh Punjab	Hans Raj Hans	Tips Industries	
1999	Gal Sun Gudiye	Balkar Sidhu	Tips Industries	
2000	Sili Sili Hawa	Hans Raj Hans	T-Series (company)	
2003	Kamliye Kuriye	Amrinder Gill	Finetouch Music	
2003	Pyar Ho Gaya	Gora Chakk Wala	Goyal Music	
2005	Je Mile Oh Kudi	Amrinder Gill	Finetouch Music	
2005	Hanju	Amrinder Gill	Music Waves	
2005	Das Ja	Lehmber Hussainpuri	Hi-Tech Music LTD	
2005	Assi Vi Tere Ho Gaye	Sonu Nigam	T-Series (company)	From TV-programme "Nachiye Gayiye Shagan Manayiye"
2008	Natth Machli	Pammi Bai	Fintouch Music	
2009	Ki Beeti	Master Saleem	Speed Records	
2010	Socha Vich Tu	Amrinder Gill	Speed Records	From movie Ik Kudi Punjab Di
2010	Ik Kudi Punjab Di - Title Song	Amrinder Gill, Sukshinder Shinda	Speed Records	From movie Ik Kudi Punjab Di
2010	Pyar Lai Ke	Amrinder Gill	Speed Records	From movie Ik Kudi Punjab Di
2010	Hathyar	Jaswinder Brar	Amar Audio/Mad 4 Music	
2011	Itihas	Gippy Grewal	Speed Records	Music by Yo Yo Honey Singh
2012	Pyar Kar Ke	Roshan Prince, Arshpreet	MH ONE	
2014	Yoddha - The Warrior - Title Song	Daler Mehndi	Speed Records	From movie Yoddha - The Warrior
2014	Yudh	Gurmeet Singh	Speed Records	From movie Yoddha - The Warrior
2014	Ghora	Jazzy B	Speed Records	From movie Yoddha - The Warrior
2017	Bathinde Wale Bai	Ninja (singer)	Yellow Music	From movie Jora 10 Numbaria
2017	Jora 10 Numbaria - Title Song	Gippy Grewal	Yellow Music	From movie Jora 10 Numbaria
2017	EK Hawa Da Bulla	Nachhatar Gill	T-Series (company)	From movie Toofan Singh (film)
2018	Hathyar	Nachhatar Gill	Saga Music	From movie Subedar Joginder Singh (film)
2021	Hanju	Kamal Khan (singer), Mannat Noor	Yellow Music	From movie Marjaney
2021	Kaavan	Harbhajan Mann	Yellow Music	From movie Marjaney

== Book publications ==
- Arthan Da Jungle (Poems)
- Silli Silli Hawa (Songs)
- Jora 10 Numbaria (Full Film Script)

== Awards and nominations ==
	Movie	Award	Category	Result	Ref.
2018	Jora 10 Numbaria	PTC Punjabi Film Awards	Best Debut Director	Won	
2018	Jora 10 Numbaria	PTC Punjabi Film Awards	Best Dialogues	Nominated	
2018	Jora 10 Numbaria	PTC Punjabi Film Awards	Best Screenplay	Nominated	
2018	Jora 10 Numbaria	Filmfare Awards	Best Film (critics)	Nominated	
2018	Jora 10 Numbaria	Filmfare Awards	Best Debut Director	Nominated	
2018	Jora 10 Numbaria	Filmfare Awards	Best Dialogues	Nominated	
2018	Jora 10 Numbaria	Filmfare Awards	Best Screenplay	Nominated	
2011	Ik Kudi Punjab Di	PTC Punjabi Film Awards	Best Lyricist	Won	
