= Yaad Grewal =

Indian actor (born 1975)

- Born: Bathinda, Punjab, India
- Other name: Yadwinder Singh
- Occupations: Actor, director
- Years active: 2004–present
- Awards: Best actor in negative performance (2008,2010,2012)

Yaad Grewal is an Indian actor who works in Hindi and Punjabi, films and music videos.

== Early life ==
Grewal was born on August 23, 1975, in Bathinda, Punjab. He did his schooling from St. Joseph Convent School in Bathinda and finished his graduation from Pravara Medical College Loni, Ahmednagar.

== Career ==
Grewal has acted in movies including Mitti (2010), Lion of Punjab (2011), Sikander (2013), Himmat Singh, Once Upon ay Time in Mumbai Dobaara! (2013), Phantom (2015), and music videos, including Sadda Haq. Known for playing villains, he was nominated and won the best performance in Negative Role award for the various films such as Mitti (2010), Lion of Punjab (2010), Sadda Haq (2012). and Toofan Singh (2016). Recently he was nominated for the movie Fateh in PTC Punjabi Film Award 2015 for his outstanding performance.

== Filmography ==
Year	Title	Language	Ref.
2010	Mitti	Punjabi	
2011	Lion of Punjab	Punjabi	
2012	Kabaddi Once Again	Punjabi	
2013	Sikander	Punjabi	
2013	Sadda Haq	Punjabi	
2013	Himmat Singh	Punjabi	
2013	Once Upon ay Time in Mumbai Dobaara!	Hindi	
2014	Fateh	Punjabi	
2015	Phantom	Hindi	
2016	Toofan singh	Punjabi	
2018	Bhajjo Veero Ve	Punjabi	
2018–present	Gangland in Motherland	Punjabi	
2021	Moosa Jatt	Punjabi	

=== Music videos ===
Year	Song	Album	Language	Notes	Ref.
