= Deep Sidhu =

Indian actor and activist (1984–2022)

1st Jathedar of Waris Punjab De
- In office September 2021 – 15 February 2022
- Preceded by: Position established
- Succeeded by: Amritpal Singh

Personal details
- Born: Sandeep Singh Sidhu; 2 April 1984 Udekaran, Punjab, India
- Died: 15 February 2022 (aged 37) Kharkhoda, Haryana, India
- Occupation: Actor; activist; lawyer
- Known for: Activism, founding Waris Punjab De
- Awards: Kingfisher Model Hunt Award; President's Scout; Best Male Debut in Punjabi Cinema

Sandeep Singh Sidhu (2 April 1984 – 15 February 2022), also known as Deep Sidhu, was an Indian film actor and Sikh activist. He worked in Punjabi films, starting his acting career with the film Ramta Jogi produced by Dharmendra under his banner Vijayta Films.

In 2019, Sidhu campaigned for his friend and BJP candidate Sunny Deol and later took a leading role in the 2020-2021 farmers' protest. A few months before his death in a road accident, he founded a Punjabi Sikh organisation Waris Punjab De.

== Early life ==
Deep Sidhu was born on 2 April 1984 (or 1979, per his driving licence), to a Punjabi family in Udekaran village of Muktsar district of Punjab. His father Sardar Surjit Singh Sidhu was a lawyer; his mother died when he was 4 years old. He has two brothers – Surjeet and Mandeep Singh. He obtained a degree in law from Punjabi University in Patiala. He dated Punjabi actress Reena Rai who was also his co-star in two of his movies.

== Career ==
He worked in legal positions for a few years, as a legal advisor to Sahara India Pariwar, in the British legal firm Hammonds, and as the legal head of Balaji Telefilms. Later, he founded a law firm Lex Legal in Mumbai.

He made his acting debut in Ramta Jogi, which brought him the PTC Punjabi Film Award for Best Male Debut in Punjabi Cinema in 2016. He rose to greater prominence with Jora 10 Numbaria (2017), in which he played the lead role of a gangster, making him a star. He followed that with Rang Panjab (2018), Desi (2019), Jora: The Second Chapter (2020) and Saade Aale (2022). The release of Jora: The Second Chapter, which was a sequel to the successful Jora 10 Numbaria, was affected by the COVID-19 lockdowns in India. Saade Aale was released in April 2022, two months after his death.

== Politics ==
Sidhu entered the political sphere during the 2019 Indian general election when he campaigned for the actor-turned-politician Sunny Deol, who was the BJP candidate for the Gurdaspur constituency. He was said to have been close to Deol and his pictures with Deol and prime minister Narendra Modi got circulated later in 2020.

During the COVID-19 lockdown in India, Sidhu is said to have read the works of Ajmer Singh, about Punjab and Sikh history. (Note: Ajmer Singh is described as a naxalite-turned-Khalistan proponent. He has written several books in Punjabi over the last decade, covering the history of Sikhs after Indian independence and representing a sense of Sikh grievance.) This led to his political awakening, as Ajmer Singh had argued that Punjab's history has been "tampered with". He uploaded several videos on social media on Punjab's history, culture and economy, and acquired a wide following.

=== Farmers' protest ===
When farmers' protests began in Punjab in late 2020, against the BJP government's farm laws, the artistes of Punjab were prodded on social media into supporting the protests. Deep Sidhu organised a protest at Shambu on Punjab–Haryana border on 25 September, along with a former gangster called Lakha Sidhana, which came to be called the "Shambu Morcha". The artist-organised protests did not meet with the approval of the farmer unions, who saw them as upstaging their own protests. They also said that these protests were misguiding the youth. Moreover, Sidhu and Sidhana were asking the protesters to broaden the agenda beyond the farm bills into a general protest against the Union government, in opposition to an alleged "attack on Punjab". Sidhu also rebuffed the objections of the farmer unions saying that he would not abide by directives that were issued from closed-door meetings. After the "symbolic protest" on 25 September, he launched a permanent "Shambu Morcha on 4 October, which continued, until, in collaboration with Bharatiya Kisan Union (Sidhupur), the morcha broke the barricades at the Shambu barrier and marched towards Delhi. This forced the other unions also to march to Delhi.

Throughout this period Sidhu was firm in his position that the protests were not merely about the farm bills, but to "change the entire power equation". They had to be seen in the context of the "federal structure and existence of Punjab". When farmer unions complained that the youth participating in his morcha did not even read the farm bills, he replied that they did not need to. If they understood that Modi wanted to "capture our lands", that was enough. At one stage, one of the protesting youth raised pro-Khalistan slogans, and the morcha manager Hakam Singh handed him over to the police. Sidhu said that it was harsh treatment and expelled the manager. His Shambu Morcha, which is said to have been independent of the farmer unions, was live streamed by pro-Khalistan channels.

The farmers that reached Delhi were blocked at the outer periphery of Delhi, where they continued their protest. For the Republic Day on 26 January 2021, the farmer unions planned a "Kisan Parade" on tractors through the Outer Ring Road, along a route agreed upon with the police. On the day before, Sidhu took over the main stage at Singhu, and argued for marching "inside Delhi". During the parade, some farmers that bought into the idea diverted from the agreed route, entered central Delhi near the ITO metro station, broke the police barricades and clashed with the police. There was rioting. In the afternoon, they entered the Red Fort area in their tractors, climbed on the ramparts of the monument and hoisted flags. Deep Sidhu was among them. According to IANS, Sidhu did a Facebook Live broadcast of the event and commented, "We have only hoisted the Nishan Sahib flag (Sikh religious flag) on the Red Fort while exercising our democratic right to protest." The federation of the farmers' unions, Samyukt Kisan Morcha distanced itself from Sidhu and accused him of leading the farmers to the Red Fort. In video recordings Sidhu was seen being chased away by some farmers. He was found to have left Delhi and gone into hiding in Haryana.

The Delhi Police booked Sidhu and Sadhana for instigating violence at the Red Fort. After a preliminary investigation, they concluded that "there was a pre-conceived and well-coordinated plan to break the agreement between the Delhi Police and the leaders of protesting organisations." Sidhu was arrested on 9 February 2021 from Karnal in Haryana on charge of instigating farmers to storm the Red Fort and causing violence. He pleaded innocence and claimed he was not involved in any violence nor incited others. He said that he had exercised his right to peaceful protest and was implicated as he was a "popular face" present "at the wrong place at the wrong time".

After his bail plea was approved, he was arrested a second time on a police case filed by the Archaeological Survey of India (ASI). ASI had accused Sidhu of damaging the monument and vandalism by the rioters. His lawyer denounced the second arrest after bail as unconstitutional. He was released on bail on 16 April 2021.

=== Waris Punjab De ===
In September 2021, Sidhu formed a political organisation named Waris Punjab De, that aimed to get more rights for farmers from the Union government. Before his death, he gave support to the pro-Khalistan leader Simranjit Singh Mann and Shiromani Akali Dal (Amritsar).

== Death ==
Sidhu died in a car accident on 15 February 2022, at the age of 37. The accident occurred on the Kundli-Manesar highway, in Haryana's Kharkhoda area, near Delhi. Sidhu was driving his Mahindra Scorpio towards Punjab. There were two people in the car; the passenger was his girlfriend, Reena Rai, who survived with injuries. According to Sonipat police, Sidhu died around 9 P.M. near the Peepli toll booth, after his car hit the rear end of a truck parked on the highway. The truck had broken down on the side of the road. The driver side of the car took the maximum impact of the crash. Sidhu was pronounced dead at the hospital.

== Commemoration ==
=== Tributes ===
In a condolence message, the chief of the Shiromani Gurdwara Parbandhak Committee (Sikh governing body) had said "Sidhu had played a leading role in mobilising the youth during the Kisan Sangharsh and spread the voice of Kisan Sangharsh across the country and the world. The serious people of Punjab are deeply shocked by his demise."

In October 2022, there were talks ongoing with the SGPC and Mandeep Sidhu (Deep Sidhu's brother) to have his picture placed in the Central Sikh Museum.

==== Musical tributes ====
Sidhu Moose Wala was a friend of Sidhu, and, after his death, became more vocal on Sikh issues. He recorded two songs on Sikhism and Sikh politics with a few more to come out in the future. In his song named 'SYL' a recording was played of Deep Sidhu's speech calling out two faced people after the 2020-2021 Indian farmers' protest and in his album "Moosetape" he played a recording of Deep Sidhu at the end of his song, 'Burberry'.

== Filmography ==
Year	Title	Role	Notes	Ref.
2015	Ramta Jogi	Jogi	Directed by Guddu Dhanoa	
2017	Jora 10 Numbaria	Jora	Directed by Amardeep Singh Gill	
2018	Rang Punjab	-		
2019	Desi	-		
2020	Jora - The Second Chapter	Jora		
2022	Saade Aale	Manjeet	Film was launched at Cannes Film Festival	

== Honours and awards ==
=== Film awards ===
Year	Category	Film	Result	Ref.
—	Kingfisher Model Hunt Award	—	Won	
2016	Best male debut in Punjabi Cinema	Ramta Jogi	Won	
2018	Filmfare Awards Punjabi	Jora 10 Numbaria	Nominated	
2018	PTC Punjabi Film Awards as Best actor	—	Nominated	
