= Amandeep Sandhu =

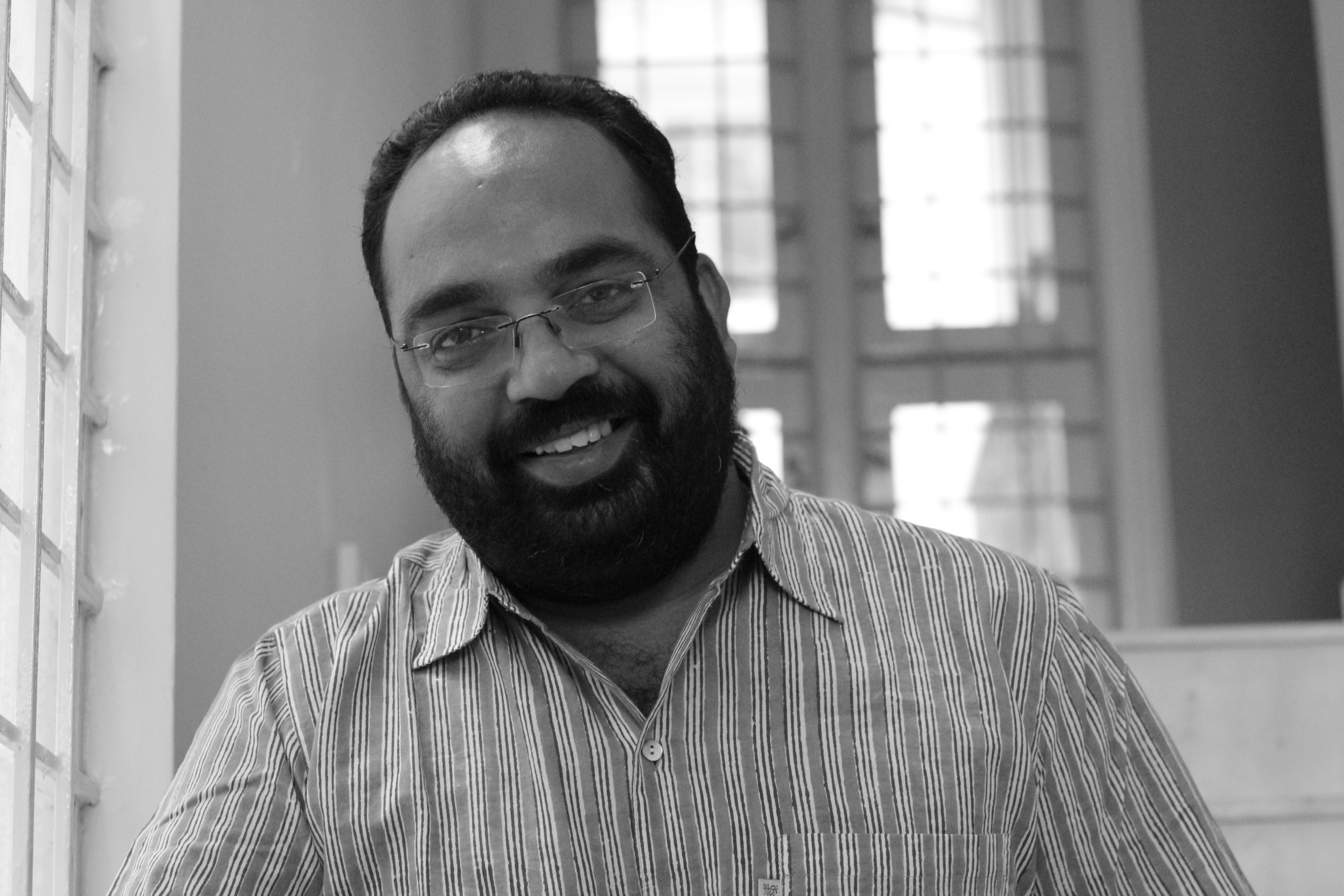
- Amandeep Sandhu in 2013
- Born: 1973 (age 52–53)
- Education: University of Hyderabad
- Writing career
- Language: English
- Genre: Novel

Amandeep Sandhu (born 1973) is a Punjabi writer and journalist who writes in English. His second novel Roll of Honour was nominated for Hindu Literary Prize for Best Fiction in 2013.

== Biography ==
Sandhu was born in a Sikh family in Rourkela, Odisha in 1973. He did a master's degree in English Literature from the University of Hyderabad. He then did a Diploma in Journalism from Asian School of Journalism.

In 2013, he joined Akademie Schloss Solitude, Stuttgart, Germany for a 2-year fellowship. In 2021, he was awarded the Homi Bhabha fellowship for 2022-24. He received a New India Foundation Book Fellowship in 2025-26 for his upcoming book Keeping the Faith: Sikhs Who Live Outside Panjab, In India.

His journalism has appeared in The Caravan and The Hindustan Times.

== Works ==
=== Sepia Leaves (2008) ===
Sepia Leaves is a semi-autobiographical novel set in 1970s when emergency was declared by then Prime Minister, Indira Gandhi and the protagonist is growing up in Rourkela and his mother has schizophrenia.

=== Roll of Honour (2012) ===
Roll of Honour is a semi-autobiographical novel which tells the story of Appu who studies at a military boarding school in the fictional town of Jassabad in Punjab in 1984.

This novel was translated into Punjabi by Daljit Ami under the title Gwah De Fanah Hon Ton Pahilan.

=== Panjab: Journeys Through Fault Lines (2019) ===
Panjab Sandhu's first work of non-fiction in which he looks at the past and present of Punjab, India in the backdrop of Green revolution, Emergency, Punjab insurgency and the present. The book was long-listed for the NIF-Kamaladevi Chattopadhyay Award 2020 and was shortlisted for the Atta Galatta-BLF Non Fiction Prize 2020.

Punjabi translation of the book, Punjab: Jinhan Rahan Di Main Saar Na Janan, was published in January 2022. It was translated by Dr. Yadwinder Singh and Mangat Ram.

=== Bravado to Fear to Abandonment (2020) ===
Bravado to Fear to Abandonment: Mental Health and the COVID-19 Lockdown is an e-book by Sandhu that was published in August 2020. The book highlights that importance of mental health and explores the effects of lockdown in India.
