= Manpreet Tiwana =

- Born: Mehal Kalan village, Barnala district, Punjab, India
- Genres: Punjabi folk and pop
- Occupation: Songwriter/Lyricist

Manpreet Tiwana is a Punjabi songwriter/lyricist from Punjab, India. He was born on June 1, 1977, in Mehal Kalan, Punjab and spent his childhood there. In his childhood, he moved to Bathinda, the city of lakes, to pursue his life.

== Career ==
He wrote songs for Punjabi films including Kabaddi Ik Mohabbat, Desi Munde. Also, he delivered judgments in various cultural activities such as youth festival of academic year 2015-16 of Guru Kashi University, Talwandi Sabo. His famous songs are:

Sr.No.	YEAR	ALBUM	SONG	SINGER
1	1999	Asin Reh Gaye Kalle	Tere Hasseyaan Ne Maar Mukaye	Varinder Boota
2	2000	Tera Rusna Manauna	Jaan Ton Pyare	Gora Chakk Wala
3	2001	Jaan Ton Pyare	Jaan Ton Pyare	Lovejeet
4	2001	Mitran Nu De Darshan	Mitran Nu De Darshan	Lovejeet
5	2002	Us kamli Diyan Yaadaan	Gidha Paundi Dian	Gurvinder Brar
6	2003	Dil Tadpde	Jina Rahaan Ch	Hakam Sufi
7	2003	Laung Taviteriaan	Laung Taviteriaan	Balkar Sidhu
8	2003	Guldasta Geetaan Da	Rangliyan Chunniyaan	Balkar Sidhu
9	2004	Mehndi	Mehndi	Balkar Sidhu
10	2004	Mehndi	Punian Da Chann	Balkar Sidhu
11	2004	Mehndi	Sohni	Balkar Sidhu
12	2004	Mehndi	Gabhru	Balkar Sidhu
13	2004	Udeekaan	Maujaan	Jagtar
14	2005	Phulkari	Phulkari	Balkar Sidhu
15	2005	Phulkari	Daultaan	Balkar Sidhu
16	2005	Phulkari	Put-Laadla	Balkar Sidhu
17	2005	Pardesi Ho Jana	Nimma Nimma	Rakhi Hundal
18	2005	Pardesi Ho Jana	Parde Ch Rakh Mundeya	Rakhi Hundal
19	2005	Need Kyon Ni Aaoundi	Larda-Larda	Rakhi Hundal
20	2005	Ishq Tera	Jhalli	Akashdeed
21	2005	Rangla Hassa	Mundri	Yugraj
22	2005	Rangla Hassa	Heer	Yugraj
23	2005	Nakhre Da Mull	Tera ki Janda Si	Jaswant Gill
24	2006	Vaisakhi-2006	Mela	Balkar Sidhu
25	2006	Paani Akhiaan Da	Tawitan Wale	Gurvinder Brar
26	2006	Phullan Wali Chunni	Bhul Taan Ni Javenga	Veer Davinder
27	2006	Phullan Wali Chunni	Jattan De Kake	Veer Davinder
28	2006	Phullan Wali Chunni	Kagaz De Phul	Veer Davinder
29	2006	Phullan Wali Chunni	Phullan Wali Chunni	Veer Davinder
30	2006	Phullan Wali Chunni	Mitraan De Na Te	Veer Davinder
31	2006	Risk	Sunakheya	Rajdeep Rano
32	2006	Mere Haaniyaan	Doli	Rupinder Handa
33	2006	Das ki Sewa kariye	J dukh hoya ta jhat dass dein	Kulwinder Kanwal
34	2006	Baliye	Pyaare	Sonu Virk
35	2006	Dhan-Dhan Dharti Amritsar Di	Daadi	Parveen Bharta
36	2007	Jashan-2007	Soude Dilan De	Nirmal Sidhu & Minni Dilkhush
37	2007	Jashan-2007	Jhanjraan	Balkar Sidhu
38	2007	Tere Darshan Karke	Tere Darshan Karke	Nirmal Sidhu & Minni Dilkhush
39	2007	Tere Bina Dil Na Lagge	Sarpanch	Bobby Gill & Miss Pooja
40	2007	Tera Mera Pyar	Jind Katdi	Vikram Sidhu
41	2007	Party	Aitwaar	Veer Sukhwant & Miss Pooja
42	2007	Chubare Wali Baari	Tere Utte Mar Mitti	Balkar Sidhu
43	2007	Chubare Wali Baari	Chananian Raataan	Balkar Sidhu
44	2007	Chubare Wali Baari	Udd Chaliye	Balkar Sidhu
45	2007	Chubare Wali Baari	Dukh Pardesan De	Balkar Sidhu
46	2007	Chubare Wali Baari	Naviye Bharjaiye	Balkar Sidhu
47	2007	Chubare Wali Baari	Khand Ban Jaani Aan	Balkar Sidhu
48	2007	Chubare Wali Baari	Dhol Vajda	Balkar Sidhu
49	2007	Wanjara	Kaafle Wale	Hans Raj Hans
50	2007	Yaadan Pyar Dian	Patli Naar De Gehne	Hardeep
51	2007	Tohar Shoqina di	Tohar Shoqina di	Jassi Sohal
52	2007	Tohar Shoqina di	Munda	Jassi Sohal
53	2007	Gori	Gori	Jelly
54	2008	Awaz Punjab Di-2	Maujaan	Masha Ali & Neha
55	2008	Gabhru Di Jann	Baraat	Sukhwinder Sukhi
56	2008	Diljaniya	Akhiaan	Davinder Deol
57	2008	Diljaniya	Sajna Tenu	Davinder Deol
58	2008	Peenghan Pyar Diyan	Peenghaan	Gurjeet Rahal
59	2008	Peenghan Pyar Diyan	Charkha	Gurjeet Rahal
60	2008	Peenghan Pyar Diyan	Boliyaan	Gurjeet Rahal
61	2008	Gal Vakhri	Dil Di Rani	Jassi Sohal
62	2008	Saanwali	Saanwali	Sikander Brar
63	2009	Hasdeyan De Ghar Vasde	Mere Malka	Balkar Sidhu
64	2009	Hasdeyan De Ghar Vasde	Hasdeyan De Ghar Vasde	Balkar Sidhu
65	2009	Hasdeyan De Ghar Vasde	Pyar Di Shuruaat	Balkar Sidhu
66	2009	Hasdeyan De Ghar Vasde	Bekadre	Balkar Sidhu
67	2009	Hasdeyan De Ghar Vasde	Maa De Sher	Balkar Sidhu
68	2009	Hasdeyan De Ghar Vasde	Beriye Ni	Balkar Sidhu & Manpreet Akhtar
69	2009	Hasdeyan De Ghar Vasde	Kann Binn laye	Balkar Sidhu & Manpreet Akhtar
70	2010	Parakh	Kabbadi	Sukhwinder Sukhi
71	2010	Ganni De Manke	Pyari	Dilbag Chahal
72	2010	Ganni De Manke	Udne Sap Wargi	Dilbag Chahal
73	2010	Folk Attack	Doriya	Balkar Sidhu
74	2011	Face to Face	Face to Face	Jass Sadhu
75	2011	Face to Face	Boliyan	Jass Sadhu
76	2012	Pendu kake(Crazy Boys)	Crazy Boys	Balkar Sidhu
77	2013	Cut Like A Diamond	Kehra La ke	Master Saleem
78	2013	Cut Like A Diamond	Shaukeen Jatt	Nirmal Sidhu & Miss Pooja
79	2013	Cut Like A Diamond	Dukki-Tikki	Meet Malkeet
80	2013	Wall Of Sirhind	Sirhind	Harbhajan Mann
81	2013	Nakhro De Nakhre	Nakhra Tera 2013 New Year	Kamal Khan
82	2014	Desi Yaar	Boliyaan	Veer Sukhvant - Renu Ranjit
83	2015	Folk Flavour	Saun	Harbhajan Mann
84	2015	Folk Flavour	Peengh	Jasbir Jassi
85	2015	Folk Flavour	Mann Aaiyan Gallan	Sarbjit Cheema
86	2015	Folk Flavour	Chunni	Balkar Sidhu
87	2015	Folk Flavour	Jattiye	Harjit Harman
88	2015	Folk Flavour	Nanad Shaukeenan	Satwinder Bitti
89	2015	Folk Flavour	Khooh	Nirmal Sidhu
90	2015	Folk Flavour	Boliyan	Pammi Bai
91	2015	Navin Viahi Jodi	Navin Viahi Jodi	Nirmal Sidhu
92	2016	Mahiya	Mahiya	Harinder Sandhu
93	2016	Qurbani	Qurbani	Ranjit Bawa
94	2016	Mulakataan	Mulakataan	Raj Aks
95	2016	Labour Chowk	Labour Chowk	Nirmal Sidhu
96	2016	Chadigarh Waliye	Chadigarh Waliye	Vikrant Maan
97	2017	Pasand	Pasand	Babbal Sidhu
98	2017	Not Time Pass	Not Time Pass	Jass Sandhu
99	2017	Photo	Photo	Jasbir Jassi
100	2018	Punjab	Punjab	Hans Raj Hans
101	2018	Sahe Chitthi	Sahe Chitthi	Jass Sandhu
102	2019	Tu meri care ni karda	Tu meri care ni karda	Miss Pooja
