= Mitti (2010 film) =

- Poster
- Directed by: Jatinder Mauhar
- Written by: Jatinder Mauhar
- Produced by: Kamalpreet Singh Bains & Rubina Baig
- Starring: Mika Singh, Rabbi Kandola, Vaquar Shaikh, Victor John
- Cinematography: Jatinder Sairaj
- Edited by: S Bharat
- Music by: Mika Singh
- Distributed by: Eros intl
- Release date: 8 January 2010
- Country: India
- Language: Punjabi

Mitti is a 2010 Punjabi film directed by Jatinder Mauhar with story, screenplay & dialogues by Jatinder himself, produced by Kamalpreet Singh Bains & Rubina Baig, and starring Mika Singh, Rabbi Kandola, Vaquar Shaikh, and Victor John

Mitti released on 8 January 2010 globally. Upon release, the film underperformed at the box office but was loved by the Punjabi audiences.

== Plot ==
Mitti is a film about Punjab's youth today and their political disputes. It's a story about four youth who are best of friends and how their life changes after an incident takes place.

Jeet Brar who is a farmer and a local kisaan leader represents the motivated and charged group of people, But on the other hand there is the Young blood of Punjab who is unaware about the danger their state is facing and these young people do not have any mission in their life, most of them want to become a singer or want to go to foreign, and some are behind to find the way how to make fast money and some of them are slaves to the corrupt politicians of the state, such type of young group of people represent the four central characters of the film namely Rabbi Sidhu, Gaazi Dhillon, Lalli Brar and Tunda. All these four youngsters work for the corrupt politician Sardar Harmail Singh. They are prone to alcohol and are walking on the way of crime. They are not all concerned about their future and about themselves, among them Laali Brar is the brother of Jeet Brar but Laali is not at all ready to listen to his brother. Beside This there is a character of a girl called Neeru daughter of Sharma NRI who has also studied with these guys in University, and Gaazi loves Neeru But Neeru Loves Rabbi and this Love Triangle of these three creates problem within the friendship of Rabbi and Gaazi, and among all the father of Neeru does not agree her daughter to talk to these criminals, from here a different angle comes to the life of these characters, and the fourth character Tunda is from very poor family but his friends never let him realize that he is from poor family, Tunda's father always scolded him that he will get nothing being with these rich people, he will have to work one day but he never listened to his father.

Among all this scenario there is a character of journalist called Sarabjit who just wants to show the truth of the people of state and wants to expose the corrupt leader Sardar Harmail Singh, he also manages to make the MMS of Sardar, but with the help of these four guys Sardar manages to take back the cd & DV from journalist Sarabjit while doing so all the four friends kill journalist accidentally.

The film revolves around the current scenario of Punjab and its problems.

== Cast ==
- Mika Singh
- Vaquar Shaikh
- Rabbi Kandola
- Kashish Dhanoyaaa
- Sardar Sohi
- Tejwant Mangat
- Hardeep Gill
- B.N. Sharma
- Victor John
- Yaad Garewal
- Kartar Cheema
- Dr. Ranjit
- Gurdev Singh
- Naginder Ghakhar

== Singers ==
- Mika Singh
- Kamal Bains (Nisdin)
- Shipra Goyal (Boliyan)
- Dev Mann AKA Gurdev Singh Mann (Lahu, Daru)
- Madhu Sudhan (Meri Maut)
- Raja (Lahu)

== Release ==
The film released on 8 January 2010.

Cinematography Jatinder Sairaj
