= Ramta Jogi =

2015 Indian Punjabi-language romance film

- Directed by: Guddu Dhanoa
- Story by: Balaji shakthivel
- Produced by: Vijay Singh Dhanoa
- Starring: Deep Sidhu; Ronica Singh; Rahul Dev; Girish Sahdev; Zafar Dhilon; Anil Grover
- Production companies: Vijayta Films; I`MPossible Films
- Release date: 14 August 2015
- Running time: 139 minutes
- Country: India
- Language: Punjabi

Ramta Jogi is a 2015 Indian Punjabi-language romance film directed by Guddu Dhanoa and produced by Vijay Singh Dhanoa under banners of Vijayta Films and I`MPossible Films. It stars Deep Sidhu, Ronica Singh, Rahul Dev, Girish Sahdev, Zafar Dhilon and Anil Grover. The film is a remake of the 2004 Tamil film Kaadhal.

== Plot ==
An intense love story is placed in the land of Punjab. The main protagonist named Jogi (Ramta Jogi), comes from a humble background and the girl, Meet, belongs to a well off family. Unlike the traditional way, here in the film the girl falls in love with Jogi and approaches him. After the love story starts, the family gets involved in it and oppose their love. Both the youngsters deeply in love take the charge to be with each other and their journey starts from Punjab and how it unfolds in Mumbai showing their struggle and the challenges faced in a city like Mumbai. While all this is happening their families takes them back to Punjab. Based on the unwanted circumstances created by their families, the climax unfolds which is unusual in terms of emotion and has never been witnessed in the Punjabi cinema before.

== Cast ==
- Deep Sidhu
- Ronica Singh
- Rahul Dev
- Gireesh Sahdev
- Zafar Dhilon
- Anil Grove

== Soundtrack ==
No.	Title	Singer(s)	Length
1.	"Ramta Jogi"	Sukhwinder Singh
2.	"Ramta Jogi (Club Mix)"	Sukhwinder Singh
3.	"Premiyaan Toun Phul"	Rahat Fateh Ali Khan
4.	"Raha khich Diyaan"	Harry Anand
5.	"Vichard Na Jayin"	Javed Bashir
6.	"Sun Sajna"	Harry Anand
7.	"Kudi Badii Soni Lagdi"	Labh Janjua
8.	"Dil Jaan"	Noor Jehan
9.	"Kudi Badii Soni Lagdi (Reprise)"	Channi Bhullar
