= Daljit Ami =

Indian film director

- Education: Panjab University
- Occupation: Filmmaker
- Known for: Documentary films; Journalism; Activism

Daljit Ami is a Punjabi documentary filmmaker and journalist, known for his activism through social action documentaries on topics such as agricultural labour, mass movements, human rights, environmentalism, Sufi tradition, and Punjabi scholars. Being dissatisfied with how Punjab was being depicted in films, he strives to portray the reality of Punjabi culture from "an insider's point of view."

The documentary films he has made include Born in Debt, Zulm Aur Aman, Karsewa: A Different Story Anhad Baja Bajey, Not Every Time, and Seva, and he co-wrote the 2014 Punjabi film Sarsa. He has written two articles for the Outlook magazine, and his latest project is a film based on the 1915 Singapore Mutiny.

== Biography ==
He has a master's degree in Ancient Indian History, Archaeology, and Culture, and a Masters's in Mass Communications. He has worked on several independent films and has created documentaries dealing with social issues and politics of northern India. In the past, he has worked as an assistant editor for the newspaper Punjabi Tribune, and has worked as an editorial consultant for Day & Night News. and Global Punjab TV, a Punjabi channel broadcast in the US and Canada. He also volunteers for Panjab Digital Library as Director of communications. Speaking about non-fiction films, Daljit Ami says:

"In our region where people have little interest in non-fiction, documentaries lose the race to entertainment. The dictum is 'nacho, gaao, socho mat', while documentaries demand that you to think." – Daljit Ami

In speaking toward film length, he says:

"The only problem with making short films is that the concept does not appeal to the larger audience and that they fail to generate any revenue." – Daljit Ami

== Work ==
Daljit Ami's Punjabi adaption of the book Roll of Honour which was authored in English by Amandeep Sandhu, and is based on the events that happened post-1984 in Punjab, as "Gwah De Fanah Hon To Pehlan", was released in November 2014.

== Partial filmography ==
- Born in Debt (2000)
- Sudarshan: An Institution Of Simplicity (2002)
- Zulm Aur Aman (2003)
- Karsewa: a different story
- Anhad Baja Bajey
- Unearthing Unfamiliar (2009)
- Not Every Time (2009)
- Seva (2013)
- Singapore Mutiny of 1915 (2014)

== Recognition ==
Times of India noted how the film Zulm Aur Aman, with its song "Zulm Rahe Aur Aman Bhi Ho" by Pakistani singer Naseebo, made comparisons between Adolf Hitler, George H. W. Bush, and Tony Blair, and illustrated how war-making can be a profitable enterprise for those that conduct it.

Tribune India referred to Unearthing Unfamiliar, a film on Sikh scholar Professor Pritam Singh and Sudarshan: An Institution Of Simplicity, a film about a human rights activist, as path-breaking documentaries.

OhMyNews praised Not Every Time, writing it "superbly portrays the ongoing struggle of thousands of rural people who leave their green fields and countryside homes to march in the streets of different towns and cities of Punjab."

In an interview with " Sikh Chic" Daljit has stated his reason for translating the novel Roll Of Honour : "Punjabi has its own texture and diversity of dialects. I thought that it would give me a chance to do something more then [sic] just translation. This invitation was too big to resist. I thought that it would be a liberating experience, which it turned out to be."

Hindustan Times spoke toward Seva and its being centred on history and Punjabi heritage conservationist Namita Jaspal as its narrative makes comparisons between the present and the past, and instructs that the present is built upon the past. The Hindu wrote "It took Daljit Ami, an independent film maker from Punjab to discover that as a result of varied interpretations of 'sewa' in the context of Sikhism, not just the preservers but destroyers of precious heritage in Punjab draw upon 'sewa' to justify their deeds." Tribune India wrote the film "not only underlines the significance of preserving heritage, but also salutes the contribution of those devoted to the onerous task of conserving."

Times of India spoke toward Daljit Ami's current project on the 1915 Singapore Mutiny and his research involving his visiting the historic locations involved.

In preserving Punjab's history and culture, Zulm Aur Aman has been archived in the Jalandhar's Desh Bhagat Yadgar Hall.
