= Mannat Noor =

Indian singer

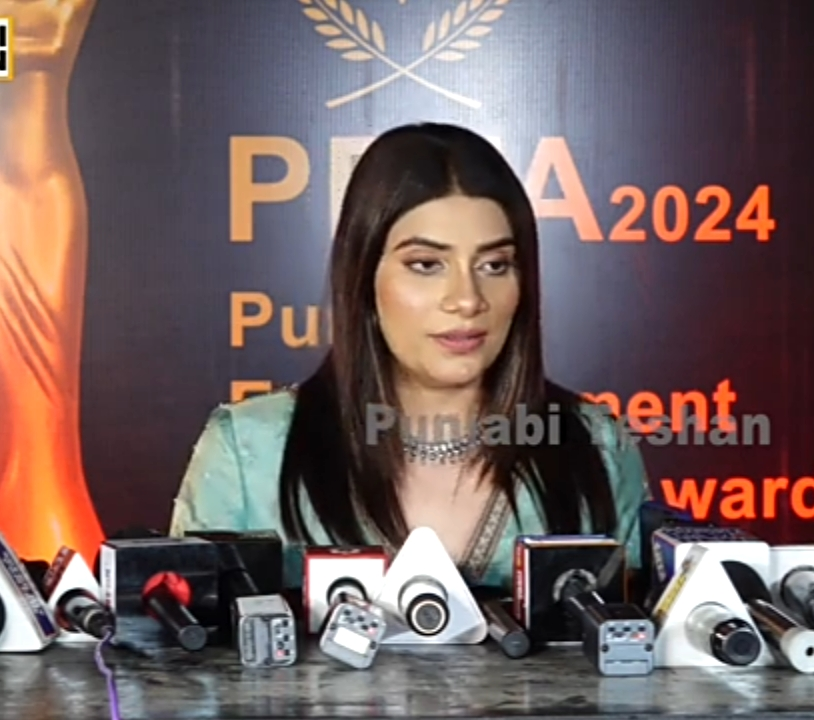
- Noor in 2024

Background information
- Born: Kelmash Devi
- Occupation: Singer
- Instrument: Vocals
- Years active: 2015–present

Kelmash Devi, better known as Mannat Noor, is an Indian singer singing primarily in the Punjabi Language. She has sung songs for films including Laung Laachi, Carry On Jatta 2, Muklawa, Sonu Ke Titu Ki Sweety and National Award winning Harjeeta. Her song Laung Laachi is the first Indian song to reach 1 billion views on YouTube.

== Career ==
Mannat Noor gained widespread popularity after she sang the title track of the film Laung Laachi which garnered critical acclaim. She contributed her voice to other tracks on the soundtrack for the movie. She has also sung many Punjabi songs such as "Makeup" and "Reshmi Chunni".

She has also supported Punjabi singer Ammy Virk on his concert tour,"Background Tour" in Australia.

Mannat Noor won Best Playback Singer Female Award for song Laung Laachi Title Track in Ptc Punjabi Film Awards 2019. In 2020 she won the same award for her song Gulabi Paani from movie Muklawa. In Ptc Punjabi Film Awards 2022 she won Best Playback Singer Female for her song Chunniyan from movie Yaar Anmulle Returns. She has received many awards other than these in her musical career in Punjabi Film and Music Industry.

== Television ==
Year	Show	Role	Channel	Notes
2021	Zee Punjabi Antakshari	Host/Judge	Zee Punjabi	Along with Master Saleem
2021	Voice of Punjab 12	Judge	PTC Punjabi	Along with Master Saleem and Gurmeet Singh
2024	Voice of Punjab 15	Judge	PTC Punjabi	Along with Kamal Khan (Singer) and Sachin Ahuja

== Discography ==
=== Film songs ===
==== Punjabi ====
Year	Film	Song	Music	Lyrics	Co-singer(s)
2018	Harjeeta	"Kinna Pyar"	Gurmeet Singh	Kaptaan	
2018	Laung Laachi	"Laung Laachi" (Title Track)	Gurmeet Singh	Harmanjeet	
2018	Laung Laachi	"Akhiyan Naar Diyan"	Gurmeet Singh	Manwinder Maan, Husanpreet Galwatti	Ammy Virk
2018	Laung Laachi	"Chidi Blauri"	Gurmeet Singh	Harmanjeet	Ammy Virk
2018	Laung Laachi	"Logo Muchh De"	Gurmeet Singh	Ravi Raj	Amrit Maan
2018	Carry On Jatta 2	"Kurta Chadra"	Gurmeet Singh	Happy Raikoti	Gippy Grewal
2018	Carry On Jatta 2	"Bhangra Pa Laiye"	Gurmeet Singh	Happy Raikoti	Gippy Grewal
2018	Vadda Kalakaar	"Akh Naar Di"	Gurmeet Singh	Vinder Nathu Majra	Ranjit Bawa
2018	Laavan Phere	"28 Kille"	Gurmeet Singh	Happy Raikoti	Gippy Grewal
2018	Marriage Palace	"Jatt Marriage Palace"	Gurmeet Singh	Happy Raikoti	Sharry Mann
2018	Marriage Palace	"Akhian Di Bhatkan"	Gurmeet Singh	Vinder Nathumajra	Sharry Mann
2018	Marriage Palace	"Nachda Palace Tak Jaavan"	Gurmeet Singh	Baljit Singh Gharuan	Sharry Mann
2018	Jindari	"Kala Shah Kala"	Gurmeet Singh	Harmanjeet	
2018	Jindari	"Gabru"	Gurmeet Singh	Sony Thulewal	
2018	Jindari	"Ratti"	Santosh Kataria		
2018	Rang Punjab	"Palkan"	Gurmeet Singh	Amardeep Singh Gill	
2019	Nanka Mel	"Tharda Dil"	Gurmeet Singh	Happy Raikoti	
2019	Munda Faridkotia	"Gabhru Faridkotia"	Gurmeet Singh	Kang Sonpal	Roshan Prince
2019	Munda Faridkotia	"Bolda Nai"	Gurmeet Singh	Anjali Khurana	Roshan Prince
2019	Muklawa	"Kala Suit"	Gurmeet Singh	Harmanjeet	Ammy Virk
2019	Muklawa	"Gulabi Paani"	Gurmeet Singh	Harmanjeet	Ammy Virk
2019	Muklawa	"Jutti"	Gurmeet Singh	Raju Verma	Ammy Virk
2019	Muklawa	"Boliyan"	Gurmeet Singh	Harmanjeet	Minda
2019	Jind Jaan	"Sari Sari Raat"	Gurmeet Singh	Happy Raikoti	Rajvir Jawanda
2019	Jind Jaan	"Veham Rakhdi"	Gurmeet Singh	Happy Raikoti	Gurmeet Singh, Rajvir Jawanda
2019	Jind Jaan	"Tariya O Tariya"	Gurmeet Singh	Daksh Ajeet Singh	Lakhwinder Wadali
2019	Jind Jaan	"Ek Tere Karke"	Gurmeet Singh	Happy Raikoti	
2019	Blackia	"Channa"	Gurmeet Singh	Jaggi Jaurkian	Feroz Khan
2019	Manje Bistre 2	"Boliyan"	Gurmeet Singh	Happy Raikoti	Gippy Grewal
2019	Naukar Vahuti Da	"Dil Mangya"	Gurmeet Singh	Happy Raikoti	Navraj Hans
2019	Naukar Vahuti Da	"Mantar Maar Gayi"	Gurmeet Singh	Kaptaan	Ranjit Bawa
2019	Saak	"Gedha Gidhe Vich"	Onkar Minhas	Kartar Kamal	
2019	Tara Mira	"Kalgi"	Gurmeet Singh	Bunny Johal	
2020	Yaar Anmulle Returns	Chunniyan	Gurmeet Singh	Happy Raikoti	
2022	Main Viyah Nahi Karona Tere Naal	"Lai Gya Kaalja"	Laddi Gill	Gurnam Bhullar	
2022	P.R.	"Wanga Satrangiyan"	Gurmeet Singh	Babu Singh Maan	Harbhajan Mann
2022	Nishana	"Chhatri"	Gurmeet Singh	Harmanjeet	Shivjot
2022	Yaaran Diyan Poun Baaran	"Gaani"	Gurmeet Singh	Happy Raikoti	Roshan Prince
2022	Yaaran Diyan Poun Baaran	"Tere Varga"	Gurmeet Singh	Happy Raikoti	Kamal Khan
2022	Mera Vyah Kara Do	"Mehendi Ni Mehendi"	Gurmeet Singh	Vijay Dhamni	
2022	Bhoot Uncle Tusi Great Ho	"Shah-E-Shehnshah" (Duet)	Gurmeet Singh	Gurbani (Folk)	Gurmeet Singh
2022	Bhoot Uncle Tusi Great Ho	"Gumnam"	Gurmeet Singh	Kumaar	
2022	Television	"Naina Diyan Galtiyan"	Gag Studioz	Fateh Shergill	Kulwinder Billa
2023	Gol Gappe (film)	"Mai Rab Taan Vekhya Nahi"	Gurmeet Singh	Raju Verma	Gurmeet Singh
2023	Bina Band Chal England	"Dil Di Gal"	Salil Amrute	Balbir Gill	Roshan Prince
2024	Allahr Vres	"Vidaai"	Gaurav Dev and Kartik Dev	Bachan Bedil	
2024	Allahr Vres	"Welcome Ji Welcome"	Gaurav Dev and Kartik Dev	Bachan Bedil	
2024	Kudi Haryane Val Di	" Dil Chandra"	V Rakx Music	Happy Raikoti	Ammy Virk
2025	Raavi De Kande	"Kudiyan Te Chidiyan"	Jaidev Kumar	Devinder Kannewala	Jasmeen Akhtar
2025	Raunak	"Chunni"	Jaidev Kumar	Harmanjeet Singh	Jyotica Tangri
2025	Soohe Ve Cheere Waleya	"Soohe Ve Cheere Waleya"	Jashan Inder	Bir Singh	
2025	Madhaniyan	"Nai Jana"	Money Aujla	Folk	
2025	Madhaniyan	"Mehndi Mehndi"	Money Aujla	Folk and Aameen	Jasmeen Akhtar
2026	Rabb Da Radio 3	"Mehandi"	Gurmoh	Harmanjeet Singh	Nimrat Khaira, Jyotica Tangri
2026	Chaali Din	"Baavre"	Beat Minister	Harmanjeet Singh	

==== Hindi ====
Year	Film	Song	Music	Lyrics	Co-singer(s)
2018	Sonu Ke Titu Ki Sweety	"Lakk Mera Hit"	Rochak Kohli	Kumaar	Sukriti Kakar, Rochak Kohli

=== Non-film songs ===
Year	Song	Lyricist	Music director	Record label	Notes
2015	"Sari Raat Nachna"	Paviter Pitta	Folkstyle	Music Box Media	Debut Song
2016	"Suit Patiala"	Paviter Pitta	R Guru	RDC Punjabi	
2017	"Sachiyan Gallan"	Paviter Pitta	Jashan Badyal	T-Series	
2017	"Surma"	Paviter Pitta	Jashan Badyal	T-Series	
2018	"Makeup"	Vinder Nathumajra	Gurmeet Singh	T-Series	
2019	"Reshmi Chunni"	Harmanjeet Singh	Gurmeet Singh	T-Series	
2020	"Tera Ishq"	Paviter Pitta	Gurmeet Singh	Worldwide Records Punjabi	
2021	"Mera Mahi"	Gurneet Dosanjh	Desi Crew	MN Melody	Featuring Yuvraj Hans
2021	"Sukoon"	Kaptaan	Desi Crew	MN Melody	Featuring Karan Kundrra
2021	"Mithi Jahi"	Kaptaan	Desi Crew	MN Melody	Featuring Arjun Bijlani
2021	"Vyah Wali Jodi"	Bhatti Bhariwala	Gurmeet Singh	MN Melody	Featuring Gurneet Dosanjh
2021	"Mithi Mithi"	Mandeep Mavi	Desi Crew	MN Melody	Featuring Gurnam Bhullar
2022	"Kudiyan Di Lohri"	Kulshan Sandhu	Kulshan Sandhu	MN Melody	
2022	"Jacket"	Kulshan Sandhu	Kulshan Sandhu	MN Melody	
2022	"Thar"	Kaptaan	Gurmeet Singh	MN Melody	Featuring Rajvir Jawanda
2022	"Kachi Umar"	Sipa Behalpuria	Gurmeet Singh	Running Horses Music	
2022	"Teri Bewafai"	Kulwant Garaia	Gurmeet Singh	Finetouch Music	
2022	"Mahi Ve"	Ekam Maanuke	Mr. Dope, AAR Vee	Hardik Studios	
2023	"Sach Sun Le"	Rony Ajnali, Gill Machhrai	Black Virus	MN Melody	
2023	"Missing"	Jassi Kirakkot	Kulshan Sandhu	MN Melody	Featuring Hardeep Grewal
2023	"Baatein Teri"	Bablu Sodhi	Black Virus	MN Melody	
2023	"Lai Jaa"	Onkar Raj, Harman Raj	Onkar Raj, Harman Raj	MN Melody	Featuring Yuvraj Hans
2023	"Suit Patiala"	Kaptaan	Mista Baaz	T-Series Apna Punjab	
2023	"Aakdan"	Gurminder Kaindowal	Gurmeet Singh	Finetouch Music	Featuring Kamal Khangura
2023	"Feel"	Shaami	Rich	Heart Beat Music	Featuring Sonia Mann
2023	"Daadi Maa"	Veet Baljit	Sachin Ahuja	MN Melody	
2024	"Ikko Jehe"	Babbu Brar	G Guri	Sajjan Adeeb	With Sajjan Adeeb
2024	"Lottery"	Babbu Brar	G Guri	Sajjan Adeeb	With Sajjan Adeeb
2024	"Channa Ve Channa"	Vicky Bhullar	Mix Singh	Sajjan Adeeb	With Sajjan Adeeb
2024	"Suit Gajri"	Maan Chakk Wala	Sachin Ahuja	Music Bank	With Sweetaj Brar
2025	"Maruye Da Boota"	Babbu Brar	G Guri	Folk Rakaat	With Surjit Bhullar
2025	"Ambran Da Jaya"	Shayar Sadeek	Tren D	Sajjan Adeeb	With Sajjan Adeeb
2025	"Tere Naal"	Vicky Dhaliwal	Master Mind	Two Bros Music	With Nav Brar
2025	"Mehrma"	Suraj Lohan	TC Music	Desi Beats Studio	With Shubh Saggu
2025	"Dj Waleya"	Baaz Sran	Sachin Ahuja	Mannat Noor	With Jyotica Tangri and Sweetaj Brar
2025	"Sukoon"	Virpal Kaur Bhathal	G Guri	Mannat Noor	Featuring Navdeesh Arora
2026	"Son To Pehlan"	Babbu Brar	G Guri	Mannat Noor	Featuring Navdeesh Arora
2026	"Kyon Rusdi"	Babbu Brar	G Guri	JCD Music	With Sajjan Adeeb
2026	"Ok Aa"	Vicky Dhaliwal	G Guri	Jagvirgill Music	With Jagvir Gill
2026	"Set Karta"	Shivjot	The Boss	Shivjot Music	With Shivjot

==== As featured artist ====
Year	Album	Song	Singer	Record label	Notes
2021	Nothing Like Before	Mitho	Gur Sidhu	Brown Town Music	Record Producer - Nav Sandhu

== Awards and nominations ==
Year	Award Ceremony	Song	Category	Result
2017	PTC Punjabi Music Awards	Suit Patiala	Best New Artist Female	Nominated
2019	PTC Punjabi Film Awards 2019	Laung Laachi	Best Playback Singer Female	Won
2019	PTC Punjabi Film Awards 2019	Laung Laachi	Best Song Of the Year	Won
2019	PTC Punjabi Film Awards 2019	Kinna Pyar	Best Playback Singer Female	Nominated
2019	BritAsia TV Punjabi Film Awards	Laung Laachi	Best Playback Singer Female	Won
2020	PTC Punjabi Film Awards 2020	Gulabi Paani	Best Playback Singer Female	Won
2020	PTC Punjabi Music Awards	Reshmi Chunni	Best Pop Vocalist (Female)	Nominated
2020	PTC Box Office Digital Film Festival and Awards 2020	Mehram Yaar	Best Playback Singer Female	Won
2022	PTC Digital Film Festival and Awards	Chunniyan	Best Playback Singer Female	Won
2023	Punjabi Entertainment Festival and Awards (PEFA 2023)		Gurmeet Bawa Memorial Award	Won

== See also ==
- List of Punjabi singers
