= Blackia =

2019 Indian Punjabi-language period-action film

- Theatrical release poster
- Directed by: Sukhminder Dhanjal
- Screenplay by: Inderpal Singh
- Story by: Inderpal Singh
- Dialogue by: Inderpal Singh
- Produced by: Vivek Ohri; Atul Ohri; Deepak Bali; Pranav Kapoor; Mahesh Sharma
- Starring: Dev Kharoud; Ihana Dhillon; Arsh Hundal; Ashish Duggal
- Cinematography: Shiv Shakti
- Edited by: Som Chavan
- Music by: Score: Amar Mohile; Songs: Jaidev Kumar; Gurmeet Singh; Desi Crew; K.V. Singh
- Production companies: Yellow Music; Ohri Productions
- Distributed by: PTC Motion Pictures; Globe Moviez
- Release date: 3 May 2019
- Running time: 142 minutes
- Country: India
- Language: Punjabi
- Budget: ₹5 crore
- Box office: ₹12 crore

Blackia is a 2019 Indian Punjabi-language, period action film directed by Sukhminder Dhanjal under the banner of HRI Productions and Ohri Productions. The film is produced by Vivek Ohri, Atul Ohri, Deepak Bali, Pranav and Mahesh Sharma. The film stars Dev Kharoud, Ihana Dhillon, Arsh Hundal, and Ashish Duggal in lead roles. The film was released in cinemas on 3 May 2019.

A sequel titled Blackia 2, directed by Navaniat Singh and Dev Kharoud reprising his role was released on 8 March 2024.

== Plot ==
In the 1970s, Punjab gold smuggling was on its high. Gamma's father was a part of inter-national gold smuggling. His mother wants to see him living a respectful life so he refused to get corrupted. Later his father's enemies force him to step into the world of crime. He reaches the top of this business and realizes he is just a puppet of anti national agencies and then he tries to rectify his mistake.

== Cast ==
- Dev Kharoud as Gamma
  - Meharbaan Singh as Young Gamma
- Ihana Dhillon as Sheetal
- Parmod Pabbi as Iqbal Cheema
- Arsh Hundal as Billa, Gajjan's son
- Ashish Duggal as Gajjan Singh
- Sanju Solanki as Jagar Singh, Gamma's father
- Ekkta Singh as Naseeb, Gamma's mother
- Rana Jung Bahadur as Roshan Lal Suniyar, Sheetal's father
- Kumar John as Gulzar, Cheema's associate
- Lucky Dhaliwal as Bhau Swaran Singh
- Ravinder Mand as Sukha
- Peter Paras as Young Sukha
- Tarsem Paul as Baba Subeg Singh
- Naginder Gakhar as Thanedaar Baghel Singh
- Lakhvinder Singh as Hawaldar Lakha
- Chamkaur Sohal as D.S.P
- Balkarn Brar as MLA Maghar Singh
- Gagan Sandhu as Jailer
- Goni Sagoo as Sheetal's mother
- Rajat Manchanda as Sheetal's brother
- Robby Atwal as Shindi, Gamma's sister
- Tiya Lakhanpal as Young Shindi
- Sharanpreet Kaur as Gul Madam
- Bunty Dhillon as Amar
- Priya Ahluwalia as Rupi
- Harmeet Jassia as News anchor
- Pargat Samrao as Doctor

== Production ==
The film was announced in October 2018 while the shooting began in November 2018. The film was shot in parts of Punjab, Bathinda and Faridkot and Fazilka. The teaser of the film was released on 8 March 2019. The trailer of the film was released on 1 April 2019.

== Music ==
The music of the film is composed by Jaidev Kumar, Gurmeet Singh, Desi Crew and K.V. Singh while the background score is composed by Amar Mohile.

Track listing
No.	Title	Lyrics	Music	Singer(s)	Length
1.	"Blackia Meets Singga"	Singga	Desi Crew	Singga	3:11
2.	"Blackia Title Track"	Gill Raunta	Desi Crew	Himmat Sandhu	2:17
3.	"Channa"	Jaggi Jaurkian	Gurmeet Singh	Mannat Noor, Feroz Khan	3:19
4.	"Nakhra"	Gill Raunta	K.V. Singh	Ninja, Gurlez Akhtar	2:57
5.	"Khand Da Khidona"	Gurbinder Maan	Jaidev Kumar	Nachhatar Gill	2:53
6.	"Koka"	Traditional	Folk style	Karamjit Anmol	4:38
Total length:					18:35

== Release ==
=== Theatrical ===
The film was released worldwide in cinemas on 3 May 2019.

=== Home media ===
The film is also available on Amazon Prime Video for digital streaming.
