= Mame Khan =

Indian playback singer

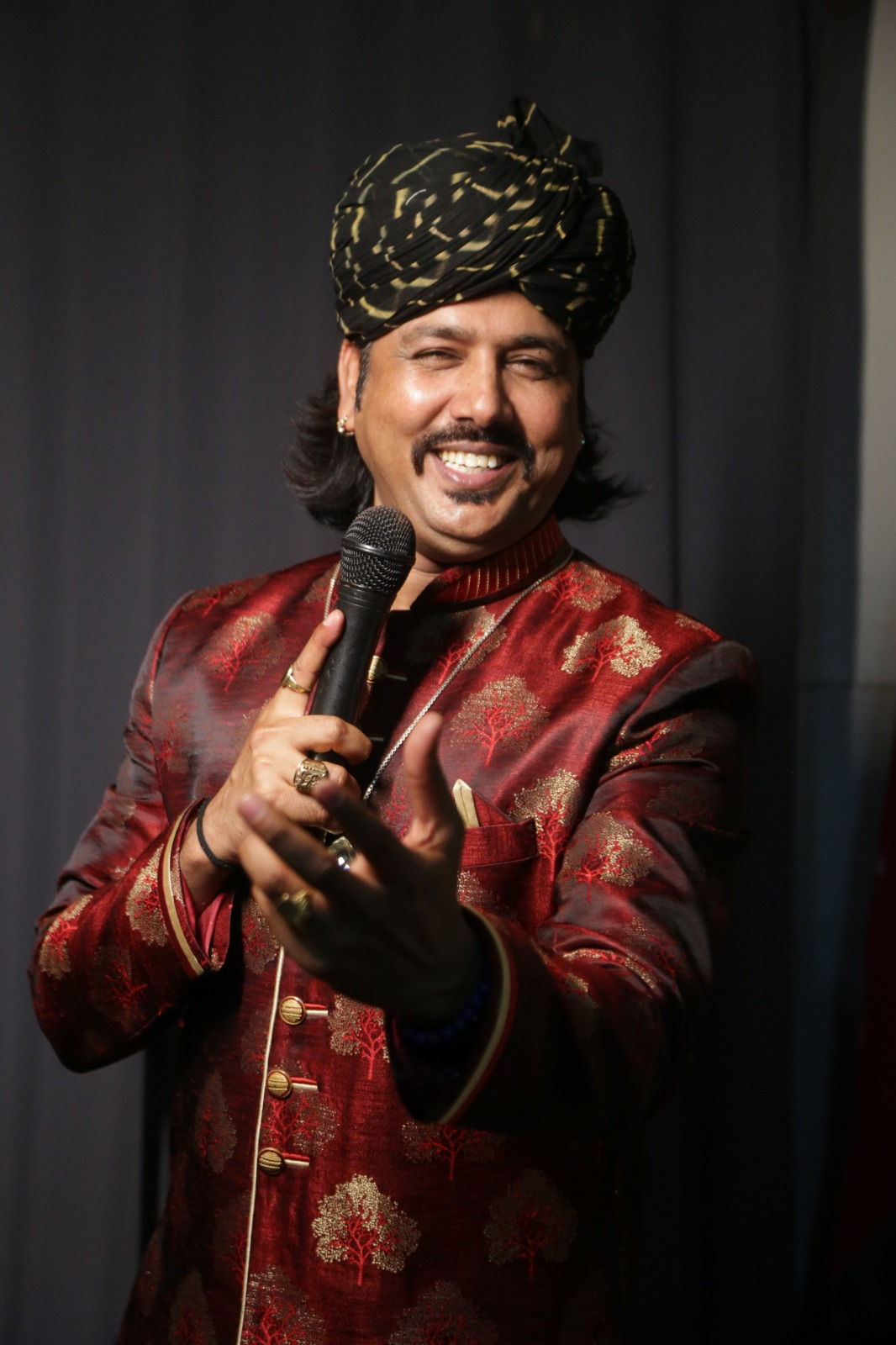
- Mame Khan

Background information
- Born: Jaisalmer, Rajasthan, India
- Origin: Rajasthan, India
- Genres: Folk; Sufi; Bollywood
- Occupation: Singer
- Instrument: Vocal
- Years active: 1999–present
- Labels: T-Series, Saregama, Sony Music Entertainment India
- Website: www.mamekhan.com

Mame Khan is an Indian playback and folk singer from Rajasthan, India. He has been playback singer for numerous Hindi films such as Luck By Chance (2009), I Am (2010), No One Killed Jessica (2011), Mirzya (2016) and Sonchiriya (2019). Khan was featured on Coke Studio @ MTV (second season) along with Amit Trivedi, the duo performed the folk song Chaudhary. He received the Best Folk Single Award at Global Indian Music Academy Awards (GiMA) 2016. Mame Khan was first ever Folk artist to walk the Red Carpet at The Cannes Film Festival in 2022 and to perform at the Indian pavilion at Cannes. Mame Khan's most recent folk, Sufi, fusion album named "Desert Rose" was released on 13 October 2022.

== Early life and background ==
Mame Khan was born in Satto, a small village near Jaisalmer in Rajasthan. He belongs to the Manganiyar community of Rajasthan, India. He was exposed to the folk music of the Manganiyar community since childhood. His father, Ustad Rana Khan was also a Rajasthani folk singer. At the age of 14, he was given a six-year scholarship by the Indian Council for Cultural Relations to pursue his studies in music and arts.

== Career ==
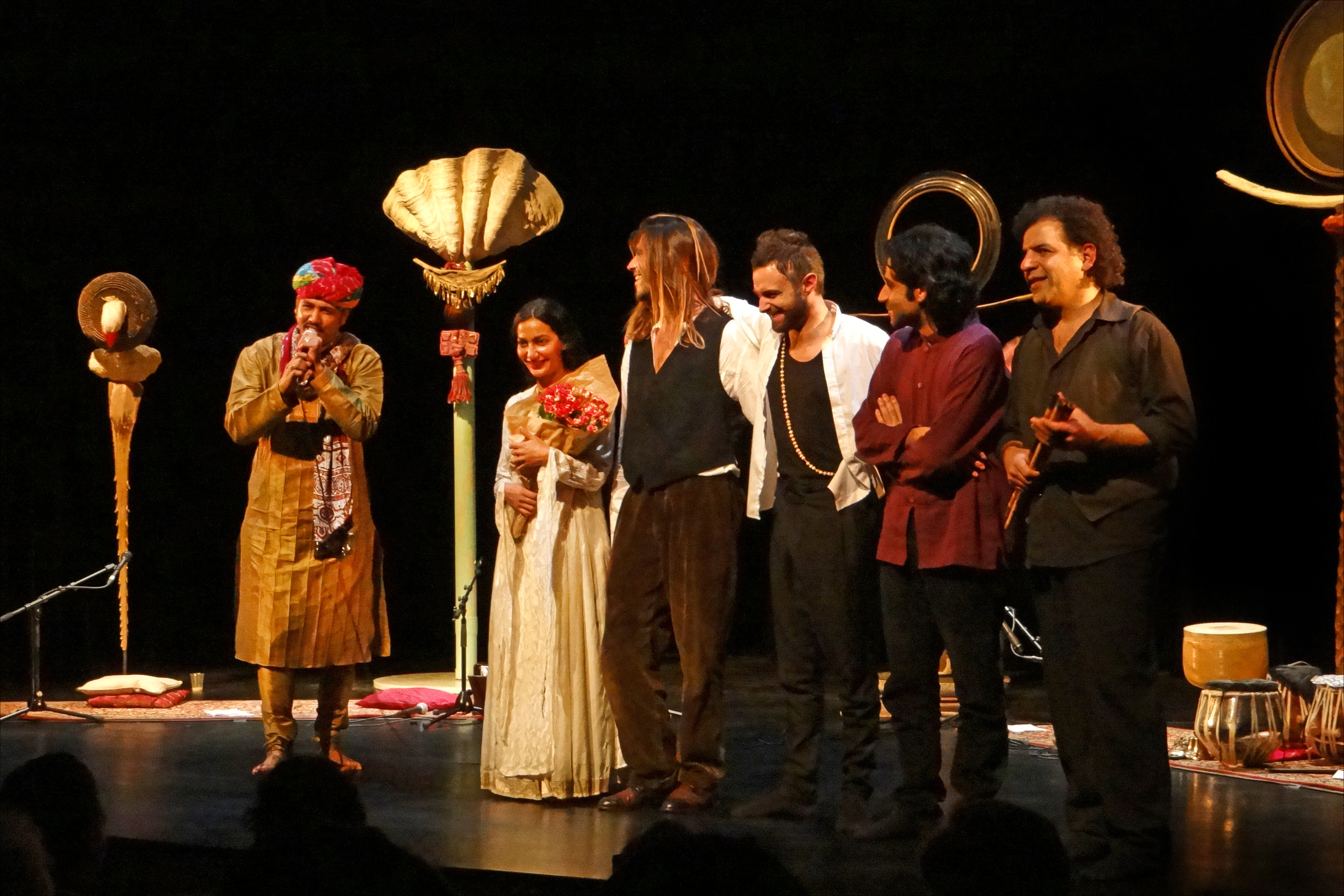
Mame Khan at Auditorium du musée Guimet in 2012

Khan made his singing debut in Bollywood with Shankar Mahadevan for the film Luck By Chance in 2009. However, he shot into the spotlight, when he appeared in an episode of Coke Studio @ MTV (season 2), featuring the song Chaudhary in collaboration with music director Amit Trivedi in 2012. Mame also performed another title Badri badariya at Coke Studio @ MTV, where he collaborated with singer Mili Nair. He sang for movies like Mirzya, I Am, No One Killed Jessica and Sonchiriya. He also lent his voice for a Hindi song in Malayalam film, Monsoon Mangoes.

In October 2015, Khan released his debut album, Mame Khan's Desert Sessions, which was crowd funded. He sang the national anthem for Hotstar and Star Sports's 2015 Pro Kabaddi League season. In December 2016, he released a single, Sanu Ik Pal Chain Na Ave, which was a combination of Punjabi and Rajasthani folk music. In December 2017, he had collaboration with composer duo Salim–Sulaiman for McDowell's No.1's No.1 Yaari Jam's Yaari song. He also sang for television commercials for clients such as Samsung and Tanishq. Mame Khan has been the voice for the nutrition campaign "Mhari Champion" by ICDS and the Government of Rajasthan.

He was also a part of Shankar Mahadevan's folk project titled My Country, My Music. He was the lead vocalist of Roysten Abel's show, The Manganiyar Seduction, which has been touring the world since 2006. He has performed at some of India's most popular festivals including the NH7 Weekender, Mood Indigo, Repertwahr Festival, Rajasthan Partnership Summit and Sahitya Aaj Tak. In June 2018, he performed with his troupe at the Mumbai's National Centre for the Performing Arts (NCPA), where he also collaborated with Kaushiki Chakraborty. First folk singer to play the opening act at NMACC's Studio Theatre in 2023.

== Discography ==
As a playback singer

Year	Film	Song(s)	Co-singer(s)	Composer(s)	Notes
2009	Luck by Chance	"Baware"	Shankar Mahadevan	Shankar–Ehsaan–Loy	
2010	I Am	"Baangur"	Kavita Seth	Amit Trivedi	
2011	No One Killed Jessica	"Aitbaar"	Vishal Dadlani, Robert Bob Omulo	Amit Trivedi	
2016	Monsoon Mangoes	"Beete Din"	Abhishek Iyer	Jakes Bejoy	Malayalam film
2016	Mirzya	"Chakora"	Suchismita Das, Akhtar Chinnal, Shankar Mahadevan	Shankar–Ehsaan–Loy	
2016	Mirzya	"Aave Re Hitchki"	Shankar Mahadevan	Shankar–Ehsaan–Loy	
2016	Mirzya	"Doli Re Doli"	Shankar Mahadevan	Shankar–Ehsaan–Loy	
2019	Sonchiriya	"Baaghi Re"	Solo	Vishal Bhardwaj	
2019	Sonchiriya	"Baaghi Re" (Remix)	Solo	Vishal Bhardwaj	
2019	The Extraordinary Journey Of The Fakir	"Maila Maila"	Solo	Amit Trivedi	English film
2020	Bandish Bandits	"Bandish Bandits Theme Song"	Solo	Amit Trivedi	Web series
2022	Turtle	"Ram Bharose"	Solo	Kunaal Vermaa, Rapperiya Baalam	
2022	Dasvi	"Nakhralo"	Solo	Sachin-Jigar	
2022	Nikamma	"Tere Bin Kya (Reprise)"	Shirley Setia	Gourov Dasgupta	
2023	Afwaah	"Aaj Yeh Basant"	Solo	Shameer Tandon	
2024	Chandu Champion	"Jamoore"	Kailash Waghmare	Pritam	
2024	Baby John	"Bandobast"	Solo	Thaman S	
2026	Chaali Din	"Taaro'n Ke Kaafle"	Mame Khan & Aaditri	Harmanjeet Singh	

=== TV shows ===
Year	Show(s)	Track	Music	Singer(s)	Season	Channel(s)
2012	Coke Studio	"Chaudhary"	Amit Trivedi	Mame Khan	Season 2, ep. 3	MTV India
2012	Coke Studio	"Badari Badariyan"	Amit Trivedi	Mame Khan, Mili Nair	Season 2, ep. 3	MTV India
2016	The Dewarists	"Mitho Laage"	Mame Khan	Mame Khan, Dhruv Ghanekar	Season 5, ep. 4	MTV India
2025	Zee Cine Awards 2025	"Mere Desh Ki Dharti"	Mahendra Kapoor	Mame Khan, Mithoon Sharma, Palak Muchhal	Season 23rd, ep. 2	Zee TV, Zee5
2025	Ek Aur Baar Kishore Kumar	"Saagar Kinare"		Mame Khan	Season 1, ep 1	Sony Liv
2026	Coke Studio	"Hivde Ro Haar'	Vaibhav Pani	Mame Khan, Mohammad Faiz, Vaibhav Pani	Season 4	MTV India

=== Singles ===
Year	Track	Artist(s)	Composer(s)	Label
2016	Kesariya Balam	Mame Khan	Mame Khan	Folk Phonic
2016	Mitho Laage	Mame Khan & Dhruv Ghanekar	Mame Khan, Dhruv Ghanekar	Dewar's India
2017	Rail Gaadi	Mame Khan, Salim-Sulaiman	Mame Khan,Salim-Sulaiman	No.1 Yaari Jam
2018	Jogiya	Mame Khan	Mame Khan	Folk Phonic
2018	Laal Peeli Ankhiyan	Mame Khan	Mame Khan	Pehchan Music
2019	Ganesha	Mame Khan	Mame Khan	Hungama Artist Aloud
2019	Sifar	Mame Khan, Tajinder Singh, Shatadru Kabir	Tushar Lall	Tushar Lall
2019	Power Is Power	Mame Khan, Clinton Cerejo, Bianca Gomes	Shor Police	Shor Police, Clinton Cerejo
2019	Dance Ganesha	Mame Khan	Mame Khan	Tamashaa Mediabox
2020	Rasila	Mame khan & Shalini Adhikary	Kapil Jangir	KS Records
2020	Sajaniya	Mame khan	Mame Khan	Folk Phonic
2021	Bichhudo	Mame khan	Mame Khan	Folk Phonic
2021	Lolee	Mame khan	Mame Khan	Folk Phonic
2021	Shri Krishna	Mame Khan	Mame Khan	Folk Phonic
2021	Holi Aa Gayi	Mame Khan & Manesha A Agarwal	Shailesh Dani	Times Music
2021	Malhar	Mame Khan & Manesha A Agarwal	Ravi Pawar	T-series Pop Chartbusters
2021	Mooch	Mame Khan & Ruchika Chauhan	Amit Trivedi	Amit Trivedi Azad
2021	Shukran	Mame Khan	Mame Khan	Folk Phonic
2021	Ik Tere Bin	Mame Khan	Mame Khan	Folk Phonic
2021	Krishna	Mame Khan	Mame Khan	Folk Phonic
2021	Moomal	Mame Khan	Mame Khan	Folk Phonic
2021	Bullah	Mame Khan	Mame Khan	Folk Phonic
2022	Darare Dil	Mame Khan	Mame Khan	Folk Phonic
2022	Judaaiyan	Mame Khan & Anirudh Bhola	GD (Gaurav Dagaonkar)	Songfest India
2022	Samjhe Na	Mame Khan & Ruchika Chauhan	Amit Trivedi	Amit Trivedi Azad
2022	Kesariya Balam	Mame Khan & Gul Saxena	Amjad Bagadwa	Tips Rajasthani
2022	Gori Matwali Ori Chori	Mame Khan	Ravi Pawar	T-series Rajasthani
2022	Gori	Mame Khan	Mame Khan	Folk Phonic
2022	Rangeelo Chokro	Mame Khan	Mame Khan	Folk Phonic
2023	Umad Ghumad	Mame Khan	Ravi Pawar	T-series Rajasthani
2023	Halla Bol	Amit Trivedi, Mame Khan, Sharvi Yadav	Amit Trivedi	Rajasthan Royals
2023	Majnu Bheeg Gaye	Mame Khan	Mame Khan	Folk Phonic
2024	Laagi Re Lagan	Mame Khan	Mame Khan	Folk Phonic
2024	Dama Dam Mast Qalandar	Mame Khan	Mame Khan	Folk Phonic
2024	Tu Boond Boond	Mame Khan	Mame Khan	Folk Phonic
2024	Garba Ghoomar Dhol	Mame Khan & Vandana Gadhavi	Mame Khan	Folk Phonic
2024	Surilo Rajasthan	Mame Khan	Mame Khan	Folk Phonic
2025	ShivaTriology - (Shiv Mantra, Mahadeva & Bam bole)	Mame Khan	Mame Khan	Folk Phonic
2025	Tu Boond Boond - Reprise	Mame Khan & Roope Khan	Mame Khan	Folk Phonic
2025	Dama Dam Mast Kalandar 2.0	Mame Khan & AJRaps	Mame Khan	Folk Phonic
2025	Hu Ru Ru Lolee	Mame Khan	Mame Khan	Folk Phonic
2025	Jug Jug Jiyo	Mame Khan	Mame Khan	Folk Phonic
2025	Banjara Jhoom	Mame Khan	Mame Khan	Folk Phonic
2026	Naughty Hiraniya	Mame Khan	Mame Khan	Folk Phonic
2026	Khwaja Ji Khwaja Ji	Mame Khan & AJ Raps	Mame Khan	Folk Phonic
2026	Nimbuda	Mame Khan	Mame Khan	Folk Phonic
2026	Mhane Rang De	Mame Khan, Chirantan Bhatt	Chirantan Bhatt	IVY Music

=== Albums ===
Year	Albums's Name	Label
2015	Mame Khan's Desert Sessions	Music Today
2016	Summer Nights on the Dunes	Living Media
2017	No. 1 Yaari Jam	Mame Khan & Salim–Sulaiman
2021	Unbounded (Abaad)	Mame Khan, Shankar Mahadevan
2022	Desert Rose	Mame Khan

=== Awards ===
Year	Award Ceremony	Category	Song	Result	Ref.(s)
2016	GiMA Awards	Best Traditional Folk Single	Saawan	Won	
2021	WBR CORP	Iconic Folk/ Sufi Singer of the Year	-	Won	
2023	Sangeet Natak Akademi	Best Traditional Folk Singer Of Rajasthan	-	Won	
2023	Clef Music Awards 2023	Best Traditional Folk Artist	Halariya - Janam Mubarak	Won	
2023	Boogle Bollywood - Ballistic 2023	Ballistic International Vocalist	-	Won	
2023	Rajasthan Film Festival	Best Traditional Folk Singer of Rajasthan.	-	Won	
2023	Jaipur Idol Music Awards - Season 7	Best Solo Album Of 2023	-	Won	
