= Ramji Rao Speaking =

1989 Indian film by Siddique–Lal

- Poster
- Directed by: Siddique–Lal
- Written by: Siddique–Lal
- Produced by: Fazil; Ousepachan Vaalakuzhy; Swargachitra Appachan
- Starring: Sai Kumar; Mukesh; Innocent; Vijayaraghavan; Devan
- Cinematography: Venu
- Edited by: T. R. Shekar
- Music by: S. Balakrishnan
- Production company: Adithya Films
- Distributed by: Century
- Release date: 4 August 1989
- Running time: 150 minutes
- Country: India
- Language: Malayalam

Ramji Rao Speaking is a 1989 Indian Malayalam-language comedy-thriller film written and directed by the duo Siddique–Lal (in their directorial debut) and produced by Fazil, Swargachitra Appachan, and Ousepachan Vaalakuzhy. It stars Sai Kumar, Mukesh, Innocent, Vijayaraghavan, Devan, Rekha, with Sankaradi, Sukumari, Kunchan and Mamukkoya in other supporting roles. The film deals with social factors affecting Kerala including unemployment during the 1980s, and went on to achieve a cult classic status.

Ramji Rao Speaking marked the debut of director duo Siddique and Lal, actors Sai Kumar (first appearance in a notable role), Rekha, N. F. Varghese and Harishree Ashokan (both in minor roles), and music director S. Balakrishnan. Mannar Mathai Speaking (1995) and Mannar Mathai Speaking 2 (2014) are the sequels to the film.

The core plot of the film was inspired by the 1971 American Broadcasting Company TV film See The Man Run directed by Corey Allen and written by Mann Rubin. Fazil remade this film in Tamil as Arangetra Velai (1990), with Mamukkoya, Sukumari and Vijayaraghavan reprising their role and the character of Gopalakrishnan being replaced by a female. Priyadarshan remade the film in Hindi, titled Hera Pheri (2000). It was also remade in Telugu as Dhanalakshmi, I Love You (2002), in Odia as Wrong Number (2002), in Kannada as Trin Trin (2004), in Sinhala as Raja Horu (2013), in Bengali as Hera Pheri (2016) and Punjabi as Gol Gappe (2023).

== Plot ==
The story revolves around three unemployed people (the third is a middle aged unsuccessful theatre owner). The story opens with the arrival of Balakrishnan in Kochi to dispute the denial of his company job which he was supposed to receive several years ago. Several candidates overtook his chance and the last one was Rani who pretends to be an influential figure, the daughter of Shivashankaran Panicker. Rani threatens Balakrishnan to continue her work despite his efforts to overthrow her. The company manager knows about her family situation and helps her keep the job. Balakrishnan is determined to stay in the town until he succeeds in getting the job.

During his stay, Balakrishnan finds a temporary lodging in 'Urvasi Theatre', owned by Mannar Mathai, with another tenant Gopalakrishnan, both unemployed and with insignificant earnings. Mathai is constantly pestered by calls intended for Urumees Thampan, a rich businessman, and vice versa. Initially, Gopalakrishnan does not like the new tenant because of a misunderstanding made by Balakrishnan that Gopalakrishnan is a pickpocket at the market, in vain. Gopalakrishnan is tricky and cunning, who lies to his mother by telling her that he works in a large company in Calcutta and that he is building a new house in Kochi. Balakrishnan discovers the truth and mistakes Gopalakrishnan as a fraud. Gopalakrishnan makes Balakrishnan to sign a white paper and betrays him by writing a no-objection letter to Rani, thus giving her the job. Gopalakrishnan brings Balakrishnan's friend Hamzukkoya who is desperately searching for him to the house. Hamzukkoya threatens to commit suicide if he does not repay the debt of Rs. 35,000 he took for his sister's wedding, which Hamzukkoya wants to use for his daughter's wedding as fast as possible. He demands the money from Rani, but what shocks Balakrishnan most was the realisation of Rani's family dire situation, having a blind son who needs a surgery worth rupees 50,000, which she had earlier demanded from Balakrishnan in return for the job. Balakrishnan gets drunk at night and reveals the fraud play Gopalakrishnan has done to his own mother, which Gopalakrishnan justifies as comforting his mother who has had health issues because Gopalakrishnan did not get a job months after passing out of college. The truth melts the hearts of both Balakrishnan and Mannar Mathai, they all become friends enjoy the night despite their unending problems and celebrates the night.

Early in dawn, Balakrishnan wakes up to a ringing telephone. A gang leader named Ramji Rao has kidnapped Nisha, Urumees's daughter and is asking for a ransom of Rs. 1 lakh. The three unemployed have no relation with Urumees; Ramji Rao had apparently dialled the wrong number. Panicking, the trio tries to find the number of Urumees from a phone directory, only to find out that the numbers of Urvasi Theaters and Urumees were mistakenly interchanged in the printed directory. Gopalakrishnan comes up with an idea and asks Balakrishnan to act as a dealer between Ramji Rao with Urumees, without letting them know about each other, and demand a ransom of four lakh to Urumees, instead of one lakh, get Nisha from Ramji Rao, and take the remaining three lakh for themselves. They narrowly escape Hamzukkoya who tries to assault Balakrishnan, who has not paid for the wedding. They find it difficult as the police suspect them and they find it hard to keep Urumees and Ramji Rao anonymous to each other. Finally, after a struggle, the trio rescues Nisha from the gang leader and hands her over to Urumees. Ramji Rao is arrested, and they confess the truth to him after a police encounter. Gopalakrishnan gives Hamzukkoya his money, but is arrested along with Balakrishnan and Mannar Mathai soon after he reaches home. Urumees forgives them and is thankful for returning his daughter, and offers them the three lakh rupees as a reward, telling them that they do not have to stay at the police station for more than an hour. The film ends with Nisha calling Urumees, mocking Ramji Rao.

== Cast ==
- Sai Kumar as Balakrishnan
- Mukesh as Gopalakrishnan
- Innocent as Mannar Mathai
- Vijayaraghavan as Ramji Rao
- Devan as Urumees Thampan
- Rekha as Rani
- Sankaradi as Hindustan Chemicals Manager
- Mamukkoya as Hamzakkoya
- Sukumari as Saraswati
- Kunchan as Mathai
- Alleppey Ashraf as Chemmeen Varghese
- N. F. Varghese as a Hindustan Chemicals staff member
- Harisree Asokan as a Sandhyav
- Amritam Gopinath as Matron
- M. L. Augustine as office peon
- Anjana as Nisha, Urumees Thampan's daughter
- P. C. George as the circle inspector of police
- Shiyas Basheer as Unni, Rani's brother

== Production ==
The movie was directed by Siddique–Lal duo, who were assistants of Fazil. The film was also produced by Fazil. Sai Kumar made his acting debut with this film.

== Soundtrack ==
The film's soundtrack contains 4 songs, all composed by S. Balakrishnan in his debut, with the lyrics by Bichu Thirumala. A. R. Rahman programmed the song "Kalikalam".

#	Title	Singer(s)
1	"Avanavan Kurukkunna"	M. G. Sreekumar, C. O. Anto, Chorus
2	"Kalikkalam Ithu Kalikkalam"	S. P. Balasubrahmanyam
3	"Kanneerkkaayaliletho"	M. G. Sreekumar, K. S. Chitra
4	"Oraayiram Kinaakkalal"	M. G. Sreekumar, Unni Menon, K. S. Chitra, C. O. Anto, Chorus

== Reception ==
The film became a commercial success. In 1989, The Hindu wrote, "Siddique and Lal have to be complimented on their brilliant maiden venture, a rollicking comedy." Kalakaumudi wrote: "Sai Kumar makes an impressive debut...However it is Innocent who is the showstealer."

== Remakes ==
Year	Film	Language	Cast	Director
1990	Arangetra Velai	Tamil	Prabhu, Revathi, V. K. Ramasamy	Fazil
2000	Hera Pheri	Hindi	Akshay Kumar, Sunil Shetty, Paresh Rawal	Priyadarshan
2002	Dhanalakshmi, I Love You	Telugu	Allari Naresh, Aditya Om, Naresh	Shiva Nageswara Rao
2002	Wrong Number	Odia	Mihir Das, Sritam Das	Bobby Islam
2004	Trin Trin	Kannada	Dharma, Rakesh Krishna, Doddanna	Adithya Chikkanna
2013	Raja Horu	Sinhala	Ranjan Ramanayake, Arjuna Kamalanath	Suranga de Alwis
2016	Hera Pheri	Bengali	Rajatava Dutta, Vivek, Subhasish Mukherjee	Sujit Guha
2023	Gol Gappe	Punjabi	Binnu Dhillon, Rajat Bedi, B. N. Sharma	Smeep Kang

== Legacy ==
Mukesh's mother's warden's dialogue in the film "Kambilipothappu (woollen blankets)" became a catchphrase.
