= Rani Tatt =

Punjabi book

Rani Tatt (Sohile Dhoor Mitti Ke)
- First edition
- Author: Harmanjeet Singh
- Language: Punjabi
- Subject: Poetry, Verse
- Published: 2015 (by Colors of Punjab)
- Publication place: India
- Media type: Print
- Pages: 159
- ISBN: 9789385670183

Rani Tatt (Sohile Dhoor Mitti Ke) {Punjabi: ਰਾਣੀ ਤੱਤ (ਸੋਹਿਲੇ ਧੂੜ ਮਿੱਟੀ ਕੇ)} is a Punjabi book, written by Harmanjeet Singh. The author got the Sahitya Academy Youth Award on June 22, 2017.

== Book Information ==
Rani Tatt is the first book written by Harman, which was released on August 19, 2015. In this book, the author has written about nature, ancient life of Punjab and life's struggles. The book is divided into two parts. The first part contains the poems and the second part is the verse. In this book the author uses most ancient vocabulary of Punjabi. Most Punjabi books are estimated to sell about 500 copies, but the Rani Tatt has crossed the figure in just ten days. So far, more than 28,000 copies of this book have been published. This book has been sold in India as well as overseas. It was published by the Colors of Punjab Publishers.

== About the author ==
Harmanjit Singh is the author of the book. Harman was born on 27 June 1991, in village Khiala Kalan which falls in the district Mansa, Punjab.
