= Harmanjeet Singh =

Indian Punjabi language poet

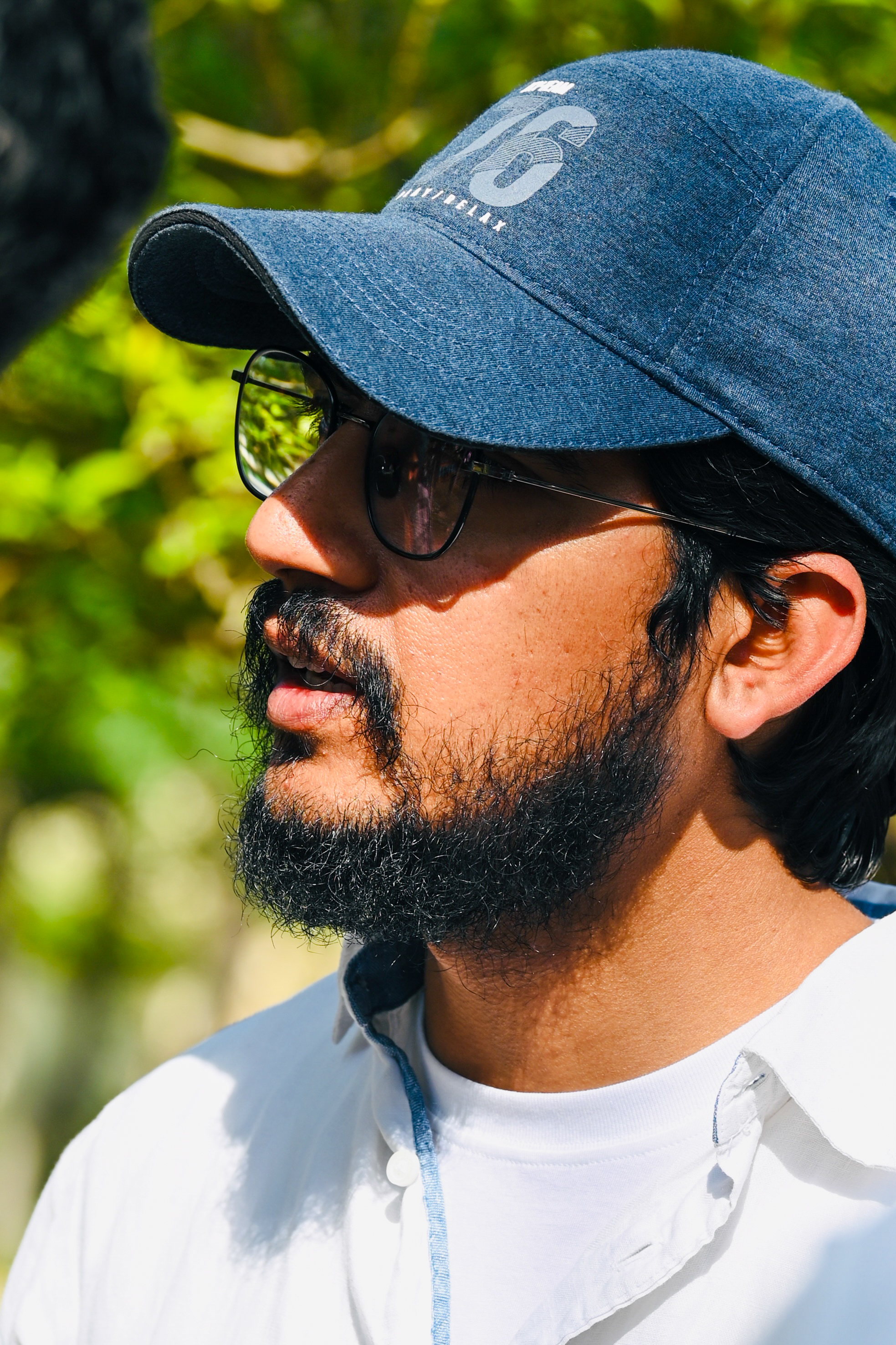
- Born: 27 June 1991 (age 35); Mansa, Punjab, India
- Occupations: Poet, Writer
- Spouse: Amrit Kaur
- Writing career
- Language: Punjabi
- Period: 2015-present
- Notable work: Rani Tatt
- Notable awards: Yuva Puraskar

Harmanjeet Singh (born 1991) is a poet and lyricist. He won the Yuva Puraskar for Rani Tatt, a collection of poetry and prose on Punjab that examines various aspects of the region through the lens of nature.

He wrote the song "Laung Laachi" for the film Laung Laachi, and has contributed lyrics to numerous Punjabi films. His work has been performed by artists including Sunidhi Chauhan, Neha Bhasin, Amrinder Gill, and Manpreet Singh.

Singh is also known for writing the lyrics to the spiritual song sung by Diljit Dosanjh, "Aar Nanak Paar Nanak", and later collaborated with Dosanjh again on "Nanak Aadh Jugaadh Jiyo". He released a series of religious tracks titled "Sooraj Eko Rut Anek" with Manpreet Singh.

== Personal life ==
Born in 1991 in Khiala Kalan village, Mansa district, Punjab, Singh began writing poetry at a young age. He completed his secondary education at Baba Jogi Peer Public Senior Secondary School and later graduated from a nearby college. He works as a primary school teacher in a government school.

His father was a veteran, his mother is a home maker and his elder sister lives at home.

== Lyricist in films ==
Year	Film	Song	Notes
2021	Puaada	"Paunda Boliyaan"	Composed music of the song

Year	Film	Song	Notes
2022	Oye Makhna	"Chann Sitare"	Written and Composed music of the song
