= Ihana Dhillon =

Indian actress and model (born 1995)

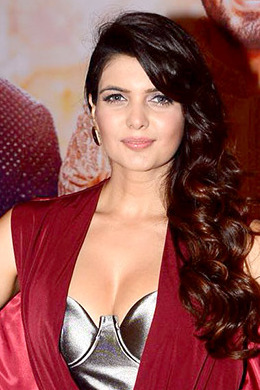
- Dhillon at the premier of Sonu Ke Titu Ki Sweety in Mumbai
- Born: Faridkot, Punjab, India
- Occupations: Actress, model
- Years active: 2009 - present

Ihana Dhillon is an Indian actress, active in both the Punjabi and Hindi film industries. She made her Bollywood debut with the movie Hate Story 4 (2018). Her multilingual abilities have helped her achieve success in Punjabi movies such as Daddy Cool Munde Fool (2013) and Thug Life (2017).

More recently she made an appearance in Radhe (2021) and in 2023 starred in Smeep Kang's Gol Gappe.

== Career ==
After completing her studies, she worked with Hotel Crown Plaza, Atlanta, where her looks fetched the attention of a modelling agency and they offered her an assignment.

In 2013, she had her film debut in Daddy Cool Munde Fool and received recognition in the Punjabi film industry for her role as Minki, a small town girl who cares for the wishes and wellbeing of her mother.

Her next role was that of Ekum Khanna, a journalist from Canada who comes to Jangpura to know more about how women deal with men who are drug addicts, in the movie Tiger (2016) starring Sippy Gill.

In the movie Thug Life she played the role of Ruchi, a struggling actress who later becomes a con artist with a gang of three men.

In 2018, she made her Bollywood debut with the movie Hate Story IV, directed by Vishal Pandya, and starring Urvashi Rautela, Vivan Bhatena, and Karan Wahi, performing the role of Rishma.

As of now, Dhillon is actively involved in Punjabi and Hindi film industry. In 2019, she appeared in Punjabi film Blackia, which was nominated for Best Picture at the PTC Punjabi Film Awards.

In June 2020, Dhillon made her Hindi digital debut with Ullu Original web series, Kasak. She appeared in 4 songs in 2020, 2 of which are Punjabi songs, Baarish & Khaas and 2 Hindi language songs, Meri Aashiqui & Bewafa Tera Masoom Chehra.

In 2021 Dhillon had multiple releases, Radhe which released in May 2021 on Zee 5 starring Salman Khan, and Bhuj: The Pride of India released on Disney+ Hotstar on 13 August 2021.

On 25 August 2022 Punjabi movie Bhoot Uncle Tusi Great Ho was released in cinemas in which she featured along with Raj Babbar and Jaya Prada.

== Filmography ==
Key
†	Denotes films that have not yet been released

=== Films ===
Year	Title	Role	Language
2013	Daddy Cool Munde Fool	Minki	Punjabi
2016	Tiger	Ekum	Punjabi
2017	Thug Life	Ruchi	Punjabi
2018	Hate Story 4	Rishma	Hindi
2019	Blackia	Sheetal	Punjabi
2021	Radhe	Nasreen	Hindi
2021	Bhuj: The Pride of India	Nimrat Kaur	Hindi
2022	Bhoot Uncle Tusi Great Ho	Ghost	Punjabi
2023	Gol Gappe		Punjabi
TBA	Nastik †	TBA	Hindi
TBA	Ji Karda †	TBA	Punjabi

=== Web series ===
Year	Title	Role	Language
2020	Kasak	Sheetal	Hindi
2023	Country Mafia	Neetu	Hindi

=== Music video appearances ===
Year	Title	Singer(s)	Label	Ref.
2017	"Yaar Bolda"	Navv Inder	T-Series	
2020	"Meri Aashiqui"	Jubin Nautiyal	T-Series	
2020	"Baarish"	Deep Money	Deep Money	
2020	"Khaas"	Navraj Hans	Speed Records	
2020	"Bewafa Tera Masoom Chehra"	Jubin Nautiyal	T-Series	
2022	"Tumse Pyaar Karke"	Tulsi Kumar, Jubin Nautiyal	T-Series	
2022	"Kachiyaan Kachiyaan"	Jubin Nautiyal	T-Series	
2023	"Bhula Dun"	Payal Dev, Stebin Ben		
