= Abhishek Dudhaiya =

Indian film producer

- Born: Mukesh Dudhaiya
- Occupations: Director; Writer
- Years active: 2003–present
- Spouse: Damyanti Dudhaiya

Abhishek Dudhaiya, also known as Mukesh Dudhaiya, is a producer/director in Hindi TV serials and film. He has produced and directed over 20 TV shows like Ehsaas, Agneepath, Sinndoor Tere Naam Ka, Life Ka Recharge and Umeed Naye Subha Ki among others.

Abhishek is presently the writer, director and producer of the multi starrer film Bhuj: The Pride of India starring Ajay Devgn, Sanjay Dutt, Sonakshi Sinha, Nora Fatehi, Sharad Kelkar and Ammy Virk. Many reviews state including official sites of various OTT's, that BHUJ may be the biggest war film release of the year 2021. It is said so because it increased the app download percentage for Hotsar by manifolds.

Abhishek is also directing Sardarni, a biopic on Shaurya Chakra winner Amrik Kaur.

Abhishek Dudhaiya is honored with the title of Honorary Professor by NIMS University.

Abhishek Co-produced multiple award-winning film I'm Gonna Tell God Everything.

== Television ==
Director

Year	Show	Channel	Notes
2003	Ehsaas - Kahani Ek Ghar Ki	DD National	1049 episodes
2006	Agneepath - Hai Yehi Zindagi	DD National	104 episodes
2005-07	Sinndoor Tere Naam Ka	Zee TV	
2016	Life Ka Recharge	&TV	43 episodes

== Films ==
Key
†	Denotes films that have not yet been released

Year	Film	Director	Producer	Writer	Notes
2021	Bhuj: The Pride of India	Yes	Yes	Yes	Released On Disney+ Hotstar
2022	I'm Gonna Tell God Everything	No	Yes	No	Released On YouTube
