= Bhuj Airport =

Domestic airport serving Bhuj, Gujarat, India

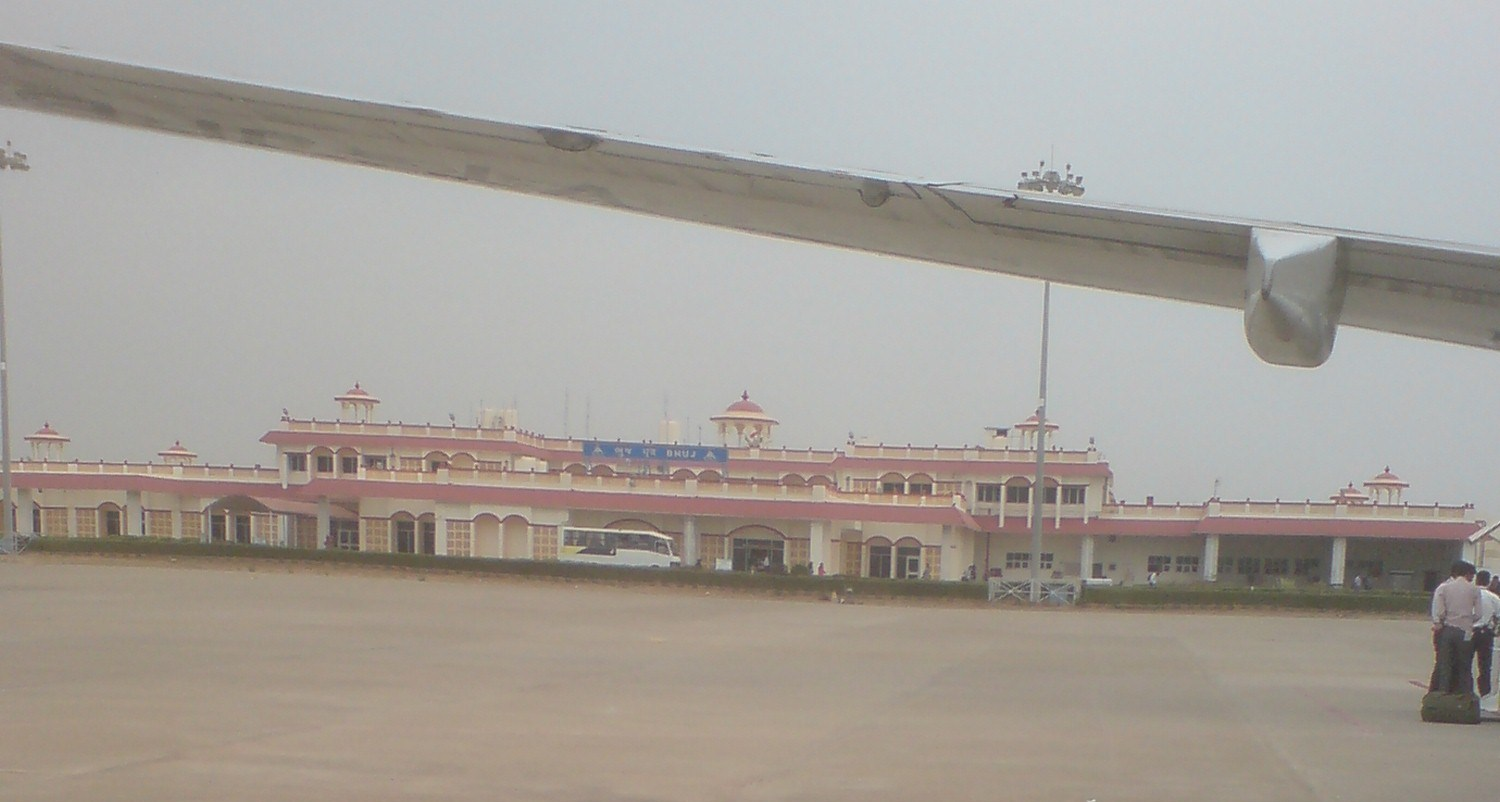
- IATA: BHJ; ICAO: VABJ

Summary
- Airport type: Military/Public
- Operator: Indian Air Force; Airports Authority of India
- Serves: Bhuj
- Location: Bhuj, Kutch district, Gujarat, India
- Elevation AMSL: 257 ft (78 m)
- Coordinates: 23°17′16″N 069°40′13″E

Map
- Location within Gujarat Location within India

Runways
Direction	Length		Surface
Direction	ft	m	Surface
05/23	8,205	2,501	Asphalt

Statistics (April 2025 – March 2026)
- Passengers: 2,80,580 (▲50.5%)
- Aircraft movements: 2,342 (▲8.1%)
- Cargo tonnage: 4.7 (▼8.7%)
- Source: AAI

Bhuj Airport (IATA: BHJ, ICAO: VABJ) is a domestic airport and an Indian Air Force base located in Bhuj in the Kutch District of the state of Gujarat, India. It is located 4 km from the city centre. It is situated at an altitude of 257 feet (78 m), and occupies a total area of 832 acres (337 ha). It is located 100 miles (160 km) from the Indo-Pakistan border.

The airport was previously made up of two bunkers/buildings near the Bhuj Rudra Mata Air Force Base, with which it shares the runway. On one side of the passing road there was an Indian Airlines bunker. From there a coach would transport passengers across the Indian Air Force grounds to the small departures terminal.

== History ==
The airstrip was destroyed in the Indo-Pakistani War of 1971, in air strikes in which Pakistani bombers dropped napalm bombs. The airfield was raided 35 times in 14 days with attacks by 92 bombs and 22 rockets. It was rebuilt during wartime by a group of 300 women from the nearby village of Madhapar who were given 72 hours to complete the task. Later the Government of India honoured these women with a cash prize of ₹ 50,000. In 1971 war the Air Force base commander was Squadron Leader Vijay Kumar Karnik. He and his 2 officers with 50 air force and 60 DSC personnel did a great job of keeping airbase operational despite sustaining very heavy Pakistani bombing.

== Infrastructure ==
The airport has a single terminal that handles all arrivals and departures. The terminal can handle 350 passengers at a time. The airport has 71,920 square feet (6,682 m^{2}) area on the ground floor and 14,880 square feet (1,382 m^{2}) on the first floor. It has two boarding gates and has the capacity for up to 200 people arriving and 200 people departing. There are four check-in counters and one security counter. There is one entry gate and three x-ray baggage scanner provided by the AAI.

The airport can handle aircraft up to the size of an Airbus A320 family, while the apron can accommodate two Boeing 737- 800 aircraft at the same time. There is also a permanent helipad located at Bhuj Airport.

== Renaming ==
In 2005, then Member of Parliament from Kutch, Pushpdan Gadhavi, as well as Narendra Modi, then Chief Minister of Gujarat, requested the Ministry of Civil Aviation to rename the airport after freedom fighter Shyamji Krishna Varma. Then Minister for Civil Aviation Praful Patel turned down the request, stating that foreigners might not be able to find the airport if it was named after someone.

== Airlines and destinations ==
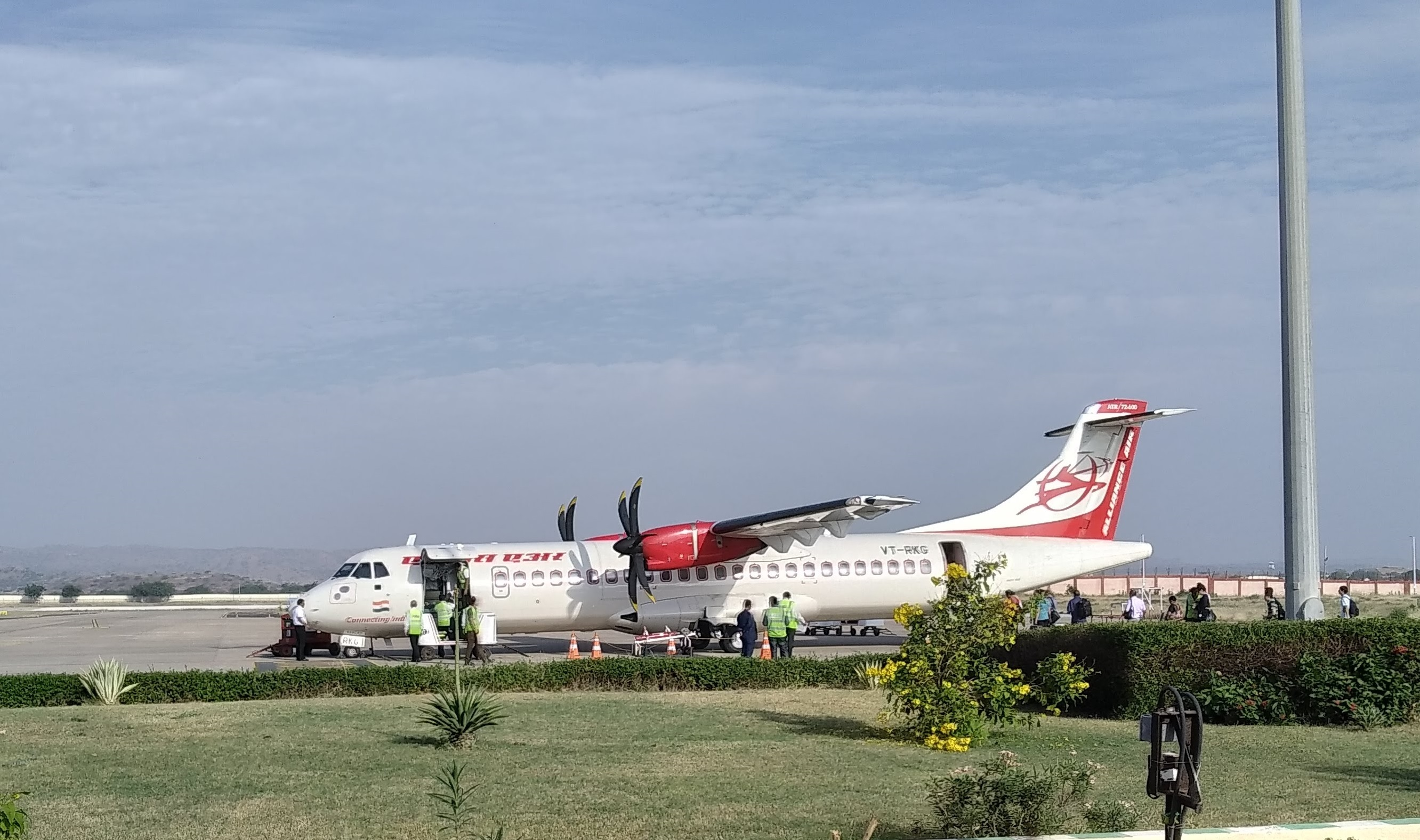
Apron area of the airport

Airlines	Destinations
Air India	Delhi, Mumbai
Alliance Air	Mumbai

== Accidents and incidents ==
The airport was damaged in the 2001 Gujarat earthquake and was renovated at a cost of ₹ 400 million. The renovated terminal was dedicated in 2003 by then Deputy Prime Minister of India, Lal Krishna Advani.

The original ATC tower was destroyed in the earthquake and an ad hoc terminal was set up for rescue operations. It was staffed by three officers of the Indian Air Force and handled as many as 800 takeoffs and landings in a four-day window. The runway itself was damaged but was repaired within hours to allow flights to land by the afternoon of 26 January itself. Equipment was flown in from places like Chandigarh and the injured were flown out to places like Pune. The air force flew helicopters into Bhuj and Jamnagar for evacuation as well as set up medical camps.

== Stats ==
Passenger traffic at Bhuj Airport (2025–2026)
Month	2025	2026	Change (%)
January	15,505	30,086	+94.0%
February	20,903	26,925	+28.8%
March	23,104	26,560	+15.0%
April	23,659	26,510	+12.1%
May	18,861	27,013	+43.2%
June	21,324	24,767	+16.1%
July	16,409	24,775	+51.0%
August	18,048	25,099	+39.1%
January–August total	157,813	211,735	+34.2%

== See also ==
- List of airports in Gujarat
