= Vijay Karnik =

Retired Indian Air Force Officer

Wing Commander Vijay Srinivas Karnik
- Born: 6 November 1939 (age 86); Nagpur
- Spouse: Usha Karnik (m.1965)
- Children: Paresh Karnik, Shalakaa Karnik
- Military career
- Allegiance: India
- Branch: Indian Air Force
- Service years: 1962-1986
- Rank: Wing Commander
- Unit: 6 Squadron
- Conflicts: Indo-Pakistani War of 1971, Indo-Pakistani War of 1965, Sino-Indian War

Vijay Srinivas Karnik is a retired Indian Air Force wing commander who is known for his leadership during Indo-Pakistani War of 1971. During the war, he was in charge of Bhuj airbase. Over the course of the war, the Bhuj airstrip was destroyed in air strikes in which Pakistani bombers dropped napalm bombs. The Bhuj airport attack has been compared to the Japanese Attack on Pearl Harbor by some. The airfield was raided 35 times in 14 days with attacks by 92 bombs and 22 rockets. Karnik rebuilt Bhuj Airport in three days with the help of 300 local women.

== Early life ==
Karnik was born on 6 November 1939 in Nagpur to Srinivas Karnik and Tarabai Karnik.

== Air Force career ==
Karnik was commissioned by the Indian Air Force on 26 May 1962. In 1967, he was posted to Pune as a part of 6 Squadron. During the Indo-Pakistani War of 1971, he was a squadron leader posted to the Bhuj Airstrip.

On 8 December 1971, Pakistan launched an aerial attack on Bhuj airbase and damaged the airstrip by dropping 14 napalm bombs from eight squadrons of Sabre jets. The airstrip needed to be urgently rebuilt due to the ongoing war. However, due to a lack of workers at Bhuj, Karnik convinced 300 women from the nearby village of Madhapar to help rebuild the airstrip. Despite the ongoing bombings by the Pakistani jets, the women were able to complete the repair work in a record 72 hours and the airbase was able to resume operations. At the end of the war, Prime Minister Indira Gandhi recognised and awarded the contribution of these women.

Karnik was promoted to wing commander on 1 October 1985.

On 14 October 1986, Karnik retired from service.

== In popular culture ==
In the 2021 Disney+ Hotstar film Bhuj: The Pride of India, Ajay Devgn played the role of Vijay Karnik, set during Indo-Pakistani War of 1971.
