= Bhuj: The Pride of India =

2021 Indian film by Abhishek Dudhaiya

- Official release poster
- Directed by: Abhishek Dudhaiya
- Written by: Abhishek Dudhaiya; Raman Kumar; Ritesh Shah; Pooja Bhavoria
- Produced by: Ajay Devgn; Bhushan Kumar; Ginny Khanuja; Krishan Kumar; Kumar Mangat Pathak; Bunny Sanghavi; Vajir Singh; Abhishek Dudhaiya
- Starring: Sanjay Dutt; Ajay Devgn; Sharad Kelkar; Sonakshi Sinha; Ammy Virk; Nora Fatehi; Ihana Dhillon
- Cinematography: Aseem Bajaj
- Edited by: Dharmendra Sharma
- Music by: Score & Guest Composition: Amar Mohile; Songs: Tanishk Bagchi; Gourov Dasgupta; Lijo George - DJ Chetas; Arko; Vipin Patwa
- Production companies: T-Series; Ajay Devgn FFilms; Select Media Holdings; Panorama Studios
- Distributed by: Disney+ Hotstar
- Release date: 13 August 2021
- Running time: 113 minutes
- Country: India
- Language: Hindi

Bhuj: The Pride of India is a 2021 Indian Hindi-language war film directed by Abhishek Dudhaiya. Set during the Indo-Pakistani War of 1971, it follows Indian Air Force Squadron Leader Vijay Karnik — then in-charge of the Bhuj Air Force Base who, with the help of 300 local women of Madhapar Village, reconstructed the damaged landing strip in 72 hours. The film features Ajay Devgn as Karnik, alongside Sanjay Dutt, Sonakshi Sinha, Nora Fatehi, Sharad Kelkar, Ammy Virk and Ihana Dhillon.

Principal photography commenced in June 2019 in Hyderabad, Kutch, Bhopal, Indore, Lucknow, Goregaon, Kolkata and Dubai. Production was put on hold in March 2020 due to the COVID-19 lockdown in India when filming was 90% complete; Devgn resumed shooting in November 2020 and wrapped up in March 2021, bringing the film into post-production stage.

Initially slated for theatrical release on 14 August 2020 on the Independence Day weekend, it was delayed by the pandemic and finally premiered on 13 August 2021 on Disney+ Hotstar. The film received mostly negative reviews from the film critics, who criticized the film for its writing, pace and unrealistic situations.

== Plot ==
The wind was thick with the scent of gunpowder and burning fuel across the barren landscape of Kutch, Gujarat. It was December 1971, and the drums of war between India and Pakistan were beating at their loudest.

At the heart of the storm stood the Bhuj Airbase, a vital lifeline for the Indian military. Squadron Leader Vijay Karnik stood on the tarmac, surveying the devastation. Only hours before, a relentless wave of Pakistani fighter jets had unleashed a fury of napalm bombs. The runway—the only path for Indian transport planes to bring in life-saving reinforcements—was obliterated. It was a graveyard of craters and twisted metal.

Karnik knew the brutal reality. Without a functional runway, the base was a sitting duck. Pakistani armored divisions were already rolling across the desert, aiming to slice through Gujarat and claim the region. The clock was ticking. They needed to rebuild the runway, and they needed to do it immediately. But there was a massive problem: the local contractors and laborers had fled in terror of the falling bombs. Karnik had the engineers, but he was desperately short on hands.

Miles away, another battle was being fought in the shadows. Heena Rahman, an Indian deep-cover spy, was operating inside Pakistan. Living a double life, she risked everything to eavesdrop on military communications. Whispering into hidden radios, she managed to transmit a critical warning back to India: the schedule of the next devastating air raids. Her bravery would cost her everything, but her sacrifice bought the airbase precious time.

Ranchordas Pagi, a local scout, tracks the movements of enemy troops in the desert. He follows the advancing troops and guides Indian soldiers to strategic choke points so they can hold the line.

Back at the airbase, Karnik’s desperate search for help led him to the nearby village of Madhapar. There, he met Sunderben Jetha Madharparya, a woman of fierce courage and iron resolve. Karnik explained the situation: if the runway wasn't fixed, the enemy would overrun their homes. Sunderben didn't hesitate. She went from door to door, rallying the women of the village.

Within hours, 300 village women marched toward the airbase. They didn't wear uniforms; instead, they wore their traditional pale green sarees to blend in with the sparse vegetation and camouflage themselves from aerial scouts. Armed with nothing but baskets, shovels, and raw determination, they began to work.

For three days and nights, the base was a hive of frantic activity. The women and soldiers worked side-by-side under the scorching sun and freezing desert nights. Whenever the dreaded wail of the air-raid sirens pierced the air, the women would dive into ditches and bushes, holding their breath as Pakistani jets roared overhead. The moment the danger passed, they would climb back out and resume laying the gravel and tar. They were exhausted and terrified, but they refused to stop.

By the 72nd hour, against all impossible odds, the runway was patched together. It was crude, uneven, and unstable, but it was a runway. Just as the final stones were laid, the doomsday scenario arrived. The Pakistani ground assault began in full force, and a fresh wave of bomber jets appeared on the horizon. Simultaneously, an Indian transport aircraft, heavy with troops and ammunition, approached the base. The pilot looked down at the dark, scarred strip of land. There were no guidance lights, and the enemy was closing in. Using manual signals and sheer grit, Karnik and his men guided the massive plane down. The aircraft hit the unstable runway, bouncing violently and straining the freshly laid tarmac to its absolute breaking point.

With a screech of tires and a cloud of dust, the plane came to a halt. The cargo doors flew open, and fresh Indian troops poured out onto the battlefield. Fueled by the incredible effort of the villagers, the Indian soldiers fought back with renewed fury, successfully repelling the invasion and securing the borders.

The strategy was saved, the region was defended, and the 300 women of Madhapar walked back to their village, having quietly written one of the most heroic chapters in military history.

== Cast ==
- Ajay Devgn as Squadron Leader Vijay Srinivas Karnik, IAF; Usha's husband
- Sanjay Dutt as Ranchordas Pagi, Indian 7rmy Scout and R&AW agent
- Sonakshi Sinha as Sunderben Jetha Madharparya
- Nora Fatehi as R&AW spy Heena Rehman
- Sharad Kelkar as Lt. Col. Ram Karan "RK" Nair, Indian Army
- Ammy Virk as Squadron Leader Vikram Singh Baj, IAF
- Ihana Dhillon as Nimrat Kaur, Vikram's wife
- Mahesh Shetty as Laxman Karnik
- Navni Parihar as Indira Gandhi, Prime Minister of India
- Pranitha Subhash as Usha Karnik, Vijay's wife (special appearance)
- Amit Dimri as Razzak Bari, Pakistan Air Force
- Nisha Singh as Prema Bai
- Vinitha Menon as Laxmi Parmar
- Monazir Khan as Anurag Tripathi
- Sanjeev Anand as Sunny
- Aditya Kumar Choubey as Aadi
- Pooja Bhavoria as Zeenat
- Vaansh Goswami as Colonel Taimur

== Production ==
=== Development ===
Bhuj: The Pride of India was announced on 19 March 2019, with Ajay Devgn, Sanjay Dutt, Parineeti Chopra, Sonakshi Sinha, Rana Daggubati (who later walked out of the film) and Ammy Virk in leading roles. Aside his acting commitments, Devgn also handled the production duties, with Bhushan Kumar of T-Series, Panorama Studios and Select Media Holdings LLP, and worked as an action director for two of the film's scenes. Directed by newcomer Abhishek Dudhaiya, it was supposed to be the Hindi debut of actress Pranitha Subhash, who worked in South Indian cinema, but eventually became her second Hindi film, the first one being Hungama 2. In November 2019, Chopra exited the film as the rolling dates were clashing with her other film Saina and later Nora Fatehi replaced her. Sharad Kelkar replaced Daggubati in January 2020, after the latter also stepped out due to health problems.

=== Filming ===
In May 2019, the film makers intended to begin principal photography during the end of October 2019, with a 20-day schedule in Gujarat, but filming eventually began on 25 June 2019, with Sanjay Dutt joining the sets. Devgn joined the sets on late-July, to shoot for the introductory, climax sequences of the film, and a song shoot in Mandvi. Filming took place in Bhopal, Kutch (Kachchh), Indore, Mumbai, Hyderabad and Kolkata. A huge set resembling Pakistan was erected in Bhopal during the schedule in January 2020.

When the film was 90% complete, production was put on hold in March 2020 due to the COVID-19 lockdown in India, and got further delayed again owing to the new shooting guidelines. Post a gap of 8 months, Devgn restarted filming in Hyderabad on 22 November 2020 and wrapped up in March 2021. The final schedule of the film took place during July 2021, and was wrapped up within six days.

== Soundtrack ==
Bhuj: The Pride of India

Soundtrack album by Tanishk Bagchi, Gourov Dasgupta, Lijo George - DJ Chetas, Arko, Vipin Patwa and Amar Mohile
- Released: 16 August 2021
- Recorded: 2020
- Genre: Feature film soundtrack
- Length: 33:39
- Language: Hindi
- Label: T-Series

Official audio
- Bhuj: The Pride of India - Full Album on YouTube

The music of the film was composed by Tanishk Bagchi, Gourov Dasgupta, Lijo George - DJ Chetas, Arko, Vipin Patwa and Amar Mohile while lyrics were written by Manoj Muntashir, Devshi Khanduri, Anil Verma, Manoj Kabir, Abhilash and Vayu.

The song "Zaalima Coca Cola" is a remake of the song of "Zalima Coca Cola Piya De" from the 1986 Pakistani Punjabi language film Chan Te Soorma sung by Noor Jehan, composed by Taafu and written by Khawaja Pervaiz but was not included in the film and drop to a single. The song "Desh Mere" was also a remake of "Allah Amar", a song from the 2019 Bengali film Shesh Theke Shuru, composed and sung by Arko himself.

No.	Title	Lyrics	Music	Singer(s)	Length
1.	"Hanjugam"	Devshi Khanduri	Gourov Dasgupta	Jubin Nautiyal	3:45
2.	"Bhai Bhai"	Manoj Muntashir	Lijo George - DJ Chetas	Mika Singh	3:40
3.	"Desh Mere"	Manoj Muntashir	Arko	Arijit Singh	3:23
4.	"Rammo Rammo"	Manoj Muntashir	Tanishk Bagchi	Udit Narayan, Neeti Mohan, Palak Muchhal	3:39
5.	"Ishq Mera"	Manoj Kabir	Vipin Patwa	Pratibha Singh Baghel	2:00
6.	"Aarti"	Abhilash	Amar Mohile	Shankar Mahadevan, Priya Malik, Sonali Chandratre, Surabhi Singh	6:19
7.	"Zaalima Coca Cola"	Vayu Shrivastav	Tanishk Bagchi	Shreya Ghoshal	3:28
8.	"Bhuj Theme"	Anil Verma	Amar Mohile	Shikha Joshi	3:57
Total length:					33:39

== Release ==
The film was earlier scheduled for theatrical release on 14 August 2020, but was postponed due to production delays followed by the COVID-19 pandemic. On 29 June 2020, the streaming service Disney+ Hotstar conducted a virtual press conference where Devgn announced that the film will release through the streaming platform, exclusively as part of the Disney+ Hotstar Multiplex initiative which was a result of theatres being shut down due to the pandemic restrictions. The digital rights of the film were sold at an amount of ₹112 crores.

Bhuj: The Pride of India was delayed extensively due to pending production works and also the streaming platform Disney+ Hotstar prioritised on the 13th edition of the Indian Premier League, held during September and November 2020. In July 2021, it was announced that the film would be premiered on the occasion of Independence Day weekend (13 August 2021).

== Reception ==
The film received mostly negative reviews from the film critics, who criticized the film for its writing, pace and unrealistic situations but praised the film for its visuals and the performances of the ensemble cast. Anna M. M. Vetticad of Firstpost gave the film 1 star out of 5 and wrote, "Ajay Devgn in slow motion does little for what is anyway a godawfully [sic] dull war saga". She criticized the writing of the script by saying "Terrible writing, sleep-inducing direction and some pretty bad acting – there’s so much that’s wrong with Bhuj: The Pride of India, that an in-depth analysis of its politics makes no sense." She concluded "Bhuj: The Pride of India clearly does not want to be like either of these two films [referring to Gunjan Saxena: The Kargil Girl and Shershaah], but it fails miserably even in its attempt to be [a] hormonally-charged, flag-waving, chest-thumping, clichéd nationalist entertainment. Yawn."

Saibal Chatterjee from NDTV rated the film at 1.5 stars and criticized the acting and writing. He summarised the film. "busy gathering the scattered splinters of its insipid ideas made infinitely worse by resolutely ham-fisted treatment." Anupama Chopra of Film Companion wrote, "The characters are stick figures who repeatedly proclaim their love for the motherland."

Shubhra Gupta of The Indian Express too gave the film 1 star out of 5 opening, "High on slogan shouting, Ajay Devgn film almost hides its real heroes", "Toplined by a swaggering Ajay Devgn, the film is so heavy on jingoistic jingle jangles and slogan-shouting that it almost succeeds in hiding the 300 women who pulled off an incredible feat." Soumya Srivastava of Hindustan Times wrote, "Ajay Devgn's chest-thumping, gunpowder-snorting film fights Radhe for worst of the year crown."

Taran Adarsh gave the film 3.5 stars out of 5 and called it "Thrilling" noting, "Bhuj is a Big Screen, mass-appealing spectacle. Scale, Star power and Stunning visuals leave you mesmerized." He praised Nora Fatehi's performance and concluded that Bhuj would've worked very well if it had been released in cinemas.
