= Ahimsa (2023 film) =

- Directed by: Teja
- Written by: Anil Achugatla (dialogues)
- Screenplay by: Teja
- Story by: Teja
- Produced by: P. Kiran
- Starring: Abhiram Daggubati; Geethika Tiwary; Rajat Bedi; Sadha
- Cinematography: Sameer Reddy
- Edited by: Kotagiri Venkateswara Rao
- Music by: R. P. Patnaik
- Production company: Anandi Art Creations
- Release date: 2 June 2023
- Running time: 160 minutes
- Country: India
- Language: Telugu

Ahimsa (transl. Nonviolence) is a 2023 Indian Telugu-language action thriller film written and directed by Teja and produced by P. Kiran, under Anandi Art Creations. The film stars debutants Abhiram Daggubati and Geethika Tiwary. R. P. Patnaik composed the music with cinematography by Sameer Reddy. It was released theatrically on 2 June 2023.

== Plot ==
The story follows a man who transforms from a coward into an aggressor due to various circumstances. How he seeks revenge on those accused of attempting to rape his wife forms the crux of the narrative.

== Cast ==
- Abhiram Daggubati as Raghu
- Geethika Tiwary as Ahalya
- Rajat Bedi as Dushtanth
- Sadha as Lakshmi-Lawyer
- Ravi Kale
- Kamal Kamaraju as Police inspector
- Manoj Tiger
- Kalpa Latha
- Devi Prasad
- Sameer Goswami

== Production ==
=== Development ===
Abhiram Daggubati (brother of actor Rana Daggubati) was announced to be playing the lead role, which marks his acting debut. Anandi Art Creations officially announced in July 2021 that their new film titled "Ahimsa".

=== Cast ===
In October 2021, Teja finalized the cast. The film marks the Telugu debut of Rajat Bedi and Geethika Tiwary. Geethika was selected to play the female lead role opposite Abhiram. Sadha, who starred in Teja's Jayam, plays a vital role.

=== Filming ===
Muhurat shot and formal launch was done on 4 July 2021, Ramanaidu Studios, in Hyderabad. Filming also took place in Mahendra Bhawan, Panna in October 2021 and Raja Gopal Das Dharamshala in Police Lines, Jabalpur in November 2021. The shoot was completed on 5 September 2022.

== Soundtrack ==
Ahimsa

Soundtrack album by R. P. Patnaik
- Released: 2023
- Recorded: 2022
- Genre: Feature film soundtrack
- Length: 19:27
- Language: Telugu

Official audio
- Ahimsa - Full Album on YouTube

The film score and soundtrack is composed by R. P. Patnaik. The first song "Neethoney Neethoney" was released on 22 September 2022.

All lyrics are written by Chandrabose.

No.	Title	Artist(s)	Length
1.	"Neethoney Neethoney"	Sid Sriram, Satya Yamini	4:43
2.	"Kammaguntadhey"	Kaala Bhairava, Keerthana Srinivas	3:43
3.	"Ammesaaney"	Mangli	3:48
4.	"Vundhiley Vundhiley"	Javed Ali, P.Jayashree	4:03
5.	"Yemo Yemo"	Dinakar	3:50
Total length:			19:27

== Reception ==
Tamma Moksha of The Hindu wrote, "I would rather take a muscular protagonist without morals — indulging in action sequences and physically hurting rapists — than watch another minute of a stingy boy-next-door who seems to draw his heroism by solely associating with a brutalised woman and abandoning his values thereafter". Neeshita Nyayapati from The Times of India said, "Teja delivers moments when you think the film will pick up pace and proceedings will turn interesting but that never happens. Ahimsa has a story and narrative that unfortunately seem stuck". Chandhini R of Cinema Express wrote, "Ahimsa wants to be a lot of things, but all it ends up being is a damp squib of a film that finds itself down and out with almost no redemption".

A reviewer of Sakshi.com wrote, "Especially in the second half, many scenes should be cut more crisply. The production values are decent for". A reviewer of ABP Majha said, "The audience who went to the theaters will feel that 'A' is missing. What more can't be said. It cannot be said that Abhiram Daggubati's debut was a hit. This remains one of Teja's flops." A reviewer of Samayam wrote, "All did justice to their roles. Rajat Bedi who played the villain, another actor who played the role of Chatterjee, all of them who appeared as the Lumbdi gang did not connect with the audience". Avad Mohammad from OTT Play wrote, "On the whole, Ahimsa is an outdated, boring, and over the top romantic drama that has tried and tested so many times in Indian cinema. There is absolutely nothing that this film offers and the so-called debut of Abhiram Daggbati is also a disappointment".
