= Rajat Bedi =

Indian-Canadian actor and producer

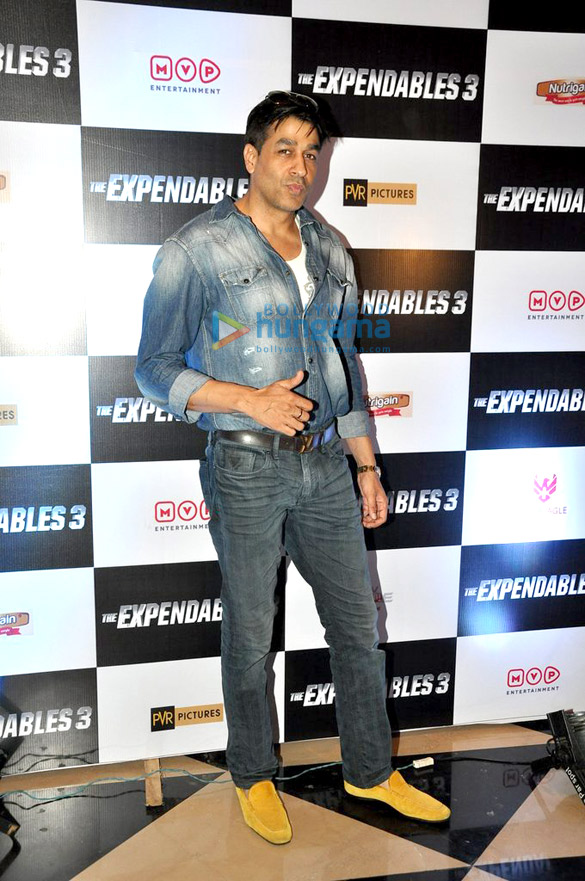
- Bedi in 2014
- Born: Mumbai, Maharashtra, India
- Citizenship: Canadian
- Occupations: Actor, producer, former model
- Years active: 1994–present
- Spouse: Monalisa Bedi
- Children: 2
- Relatives: Bedi family

Rajat Bedi is an Indo-Canadian actor, producer, and former model known primarily for his work in Hindi cinema, with roles in Punjabi, Tamil, Telugu, and Kannada films. He is the son of director-producer Narendra Bedi and grandson of Urdu writer-director Rajinder Singh Bedi.

== Early life ==
Rajat Bedi was born in Mumbai, India, to filmmaker Narendra Bedi and is the grandson of Rajinder Singh Bedi, an important Urdu writer also known for penning the dialogues of classics like Satyakam (1969). After his father’s death at age 45, when Rajat was 9, the family faced financial hardship. In a 2024 interview, Bedi recalled that only filmmaker Prakash Mehra provided financial support to his mother for several months. Two years later, his grandfather’s death further distanced the family from Bollywood. His mother encouraged him to re-enter the industry at 18 by assisting director Ramesh Sippy. During the filming of Zamaana Deewana (1995), Shah Rukh Khan nicknamed him "Tiger".

== Career ==
=== Fashion model ===
Bedi began his career as a fashion model, winning the inaugural Gladrags Manhunt Contest in 1994.

=== Actor ===
Bedi debuted as a lead in the 1998 sci-fi film 2001: Do Hazaar Ek, which was a commercial failure. He transitioned to supporting and antagonistic roles, gaining recognition for playing Raj Saxena in the 2003 blockbuster Koi... Mil Gaya, directed by Rakesh Roshan. He has appeared in over 40 films, including Jodi No.1 (2001), Rakht (2004), Khamoshh... Khauff Ki Raat (2005), and Rocky - The Rebel (2006).

His television credits include:

Year	Series	Role	Notes
1993–1996	Humrahi		
2002–2008	Kasautii Zindagii Kay		
2006–2007	Aahat		

After facing limited opportunities in Bollywood, Bedi relocated to Vancouver, Canada, where he ventured into real estate but faced financial setbacks. He returned to acting with roles in South Indian films, including the Tamil film Gajendra (2004), Kannada film Jaggu Dada (2016), and Telugu film Ahimsa (2023). In 2025, he made a Hindi cinema comeback with a role as Jaraj Saxena in the Netflix series The Ba***ds of Bollywood, directed by Aryan Khan, earning praise and expressing gratitude to Shah Rukh Khan for reviving his career.

=== Producer ===
With his sister Ila Bedi Dutta, Bedi co-produced the 2015 television series Lajwanti, based on his grandfather’s book set during the Partition of India. In 2023, he co-produced and starred in the Punjabi comedy film Gol Gappe, inspired by Hera Pheri.

== Personal life ==
Bedi identifies as Sikh.

Bedi is married to Monalisa Bedi, sister of actress Tulip Joshi, and resided in Vancouver with their two children, Vivaan and Vera Bedi until July 2023, when they returned to Mumbai.

He has discussed his struggles with industry politics, including a fallout with Salman Khan over a shelved Rs 100 crore film project. He also revealed how his father’s career was impacted by 1970s Bollywood rivalries between Rajesh Khanna and Amitabh Bachchan, leading to financial ruin and alcoholism.

== Filmography ==
Year	Title	Role	Notes
1998	2001: Do Hazaar Ek	Inspector Rajat	
1999	International Khiladi	Amit	
2001	Jodi No.1	Tiger	Guest appearance
2001	Indian	Sanjay Singhania	
2002	Yeh Dil Aashiqanaa	Vijay Varma	
2002	Maa Tujhhe Salaam	Capt. Naseer Khan	Guest appearance
2002	Ab Ke Baras	Rajbir Singhal	
2002	Jaani Dushman: Ek Anokhi Kahani	Rajesh	
2002	Chor Machaaye Shor	Tony	
2003	The Hero: Love Story of a Spy	Militant	
2003	Border Hindustan Ka	Hari Singh	
2003	Koi... Mil Gaya	Raj Saxena	Breakthrough role
2004	Woh Tera Naam Tha	Basharat Ali	
2004	Rakht	ACP Ranbir Singh	
2004	Gajendra	Chotta Babu	Tamil film
2005	Khamoshh... Khauff Ki Raat	Varun	
2005	Fun: Can Be Dangerous Sometimes		
2005	Vaah! Life Ho Toh Aisi!	Punky	Special appearance
2005	Bluffmaster!		Special appearance
2006	Aksar	Officer Steve Bakshi	
2006	Rocky - The Rebel	Anthony D'Silva	
2006	Hello? Kaun Hai!	Sanjeev	
2007	Life Mein Kabhie Kabhiee	Rohit Kumar	
2007	The Train	Officer Asif Ahmed Khan	Special appearance
2007	Partner	Neil Bakshi	Special Appearance
2008	Lakh Pardesi Hoiye	Harry	Punjabi film
2012	Monopoly the Game of Money		
2016	Jaggu Dada	Don Subhash Bhai	Kannada film
2023	Gol Gappe	Pali	Punjabi film
2023	Ahimsa	Dushtanth	Telugu film
2025	The Ba***ds of Bollywood	Jaraj Saxena	Netflix Hindi series
