= Raju Verma =

Punjabi film writer

Raju Verma is a Punjabi film writer, best known for his Punjabi films Aate di chidi. Verma is a resident of Cheema Mandi village in Sangrur. His films Loud Speaker and Kainchi Kapda ate Machine are in pre-production stages.

== Filmography ==
Key
†	Denotes films that have not yet been released

Year	Film	Story	Screenplay	Dialogues	Notes
	Awesome Mausam	No	No	No	Stunt Designer
2018	Kurmaiyan	No	Yes	No	
2018	Aate Di Chidi	Yes	Yes	Yes	
2019	Lukan Michi	Yes	Yes	Yes	
2019	Muklawa	No	No	Yes	
2019	Laddu Barfi †	Yes	Yes	Yes	Stuck in Post Production (Delayed)
2019	Chidi Udd Kaa Udd †	Yes	Yes	Yes	Shelved
2021	Vardaat (Webseries)	Yes	Yes	Yes	Available On Chaupal OTT
2021	Fuffad Ji	Yes	Yes	Yes	
2022	Umran Ch Ki Rakheya (Web Film)	Yes	Yes	Yes	Available On Chaupal OTT
2022	Ni Main Sass Kutni	Yes	Yes	Yes	Co-Screenwriter with Mohit Banwait and Parveen Kumar
2022	Khaao Piyo Aish Karo	No	Yes	No	Co-Screenwriter with Ksshitij Chaudhary
2022	Shahi Majra (Webseries)	Yes	Yes	Yes	Available On Chaupal OTT, Co-Screenwriter and Co-Dialogue Writer with Prem Singh Sidhu
2022	Chhalle Mundiyaan	Yes	Yes	Yes	Available On Sony Liv
2023	Gol Gappe (film)	No	No	Yes	Official Remake of Ramji Rao Speaking (Malayalam) (1989)
2023	Boooo Main Dargi †	Yes	Yes	Yes	In Post Production
2023	Fer Mamla Gadbad Hai †	No	No	Yes	In Post Production
2023	Welcome Bhua Ji †	No	No	Yes	In Post Production
2023	Fikar Karo Na †	Yes	Yes	Yes	In Post Production
2023	Selfie †	Yes	Yes	Yes	In Post Production
2023	Sheela Jeet (Web Film) †	Yes	Yes	Yes	In Post Production
2023	Bina Band Chal England †	Yes	Yes	Yes	In Post Production
2023	Maan V/s Khan †	Yes	Yes	Yes	Filming
2023	Untitled - With Ranjit Bawa †	Yes	Yes	Yes	In Pre Production
