= Laung Laachi =

Indian Punjabi-language romantic drama film

- Theatrical release poster
- Directed by: Amberdeep Singh
- Screenplay by: Amberdeep Singh
- Produced by: Bhagwant Virk; Nav Virk
- Starring: Amberdeep Singh; Neeru Bajwa; Ammy Virk; Amrit Maan; Nirmal Rishi
- Edited by: Sadik Ali Shaikh
- Music by: Gurmeet Singh; DJ Flow
- Production company: Villagers Film Studio
- Distributed by: Omjee Group
- Release date: 9 March 2018 (India)
- Running time: 137 minutes
- Country: India
- Language: Punjabi

Laung Laachi (transl. Clove & Cardamom) is a 2018 Indian Punjabi-language romantic drama film written and directed by Amberdeep Singh. Produced by Villagers Film Studio, it stars Amberdeep Singh, Neeru Bajwa and Ammy Virk. The film chronicles the story of a married couple who decided to live as strangers under one roof, following the wife's desire to fall in love before marriage. Laung Laachi has Amrit Maan, Nirmal Rishi, Baninder Bunny, and Gurpreet Bhangu in supporting roles.

Gurmeet Singh composed the film's soundtrack, which features vocals from Virk, Mannat Noor, Prabh Gill, Maan, and Gurshabad. The "title track song" and "Rooh De Rukh" from the film's soundtrack became popular. The title track of the film became the first Indian music video to surpass one billion views on YouTube. The film was released theatrically on 9 March 2018 in India.

== Plot ==
Laachi (Neeru Bajwa) marries Mehnga (Amberdeep Singh). She loves to sing and dance. She tells Mehnga she wanted to fall in love and marry, but instead married as per her family's wishes. She asks him to pretend they are strangers so she can fulfill her fantasy now. Mehnga agrees even though he is clueless as to how to woo a girl. They play this game and happily live their life.

Laachi gets a chance to sing a song and make some money. Due to financial difficulties, she ends up singing and dancing with family's approval. Meanwhile, a famous singer, Ajitpal Singh, sees Laachi and signs her up with him. His management company has Laachi and Mehnga sign a document affirming they are single so the Laachi-Ajitpal duo can become more famous. Laachi is star-struck by Ajitpal and agrees with whatever he suggests. Ajitpal is infatuated with Laachi and tries to separate the husband and wife. Mehnga leaves Laachi and returns to his village due to some misunderstandings. Laachi follows him and resolves the misunderstandings.

== Cast ==
- Amberdeep Singh as Mehnga
- Neeru Bajwa as Laachi
- Ammy Virk as Ajitpal Singh
- Gurpreet Bhangu as Bebe Tej Kaur
- Baninder Bunny as neighbor
- Nirmal Rishi as Ajitpal's daadi
- Amrit Maan as Singer Jagtaar Maan
- Gurinder Makna as Mehnga's uncle
- Prince Kanwaljit Singh
- Veet Baljit as Geetkar Kaonkeaan Wala
- Labh Chatamliwala as Gaama Singh

== Soundtrack ==
Laung Laachi

Soundtrack album by Gurmeet Singh
- Released: 8 March 2018
- Genre: Feature film soundtrack
- Length: 24:17
- Language: Punjabi
- Label: T-Series

Soundtrack album of the film consists of 8 tracks sung by singers like Mannat Noor, Ammy Virk and Prabh Gill. The album was released by T-Series on 8 March 2018.

| No. | Title | Singer(s) | Length |
|---|---|---|---|
| 1. | "Laung Laachi" (Title Track) | Mannat Noor | 2:40 |
| 2. | "Akhiyaan Naar Diyan" | Ammy Virk & Mannat Noor | 3:34 |
| 3. | "Sheesha" | Mannat Noor | 2:34 |
| 4. | "Radio" | Ammy Virk | 2:55 |
| 5. | "Rooh De Rukh" (The Bedroom Mix) | Prabh Gill | 3:38 |
| 6. | "Chidi Blauri" | Ammy Virk & Mannat Noor | 3:16 |
| 7. | "Logo Muchh De" | Amrit Maan & Mannat Noor | 2:56 |
| 8. | "Laung Laachi" ((Title Track) [Male Version]) | Gurshabad | 2:44 |
| Total length: | | | 24:17 |

== Sequel ==
A sequel of the film titled as Laung Laachi 2 with same cast of Neeru Bajwa, Singh and Ammy Virk and directed by Amberdeep Singh released on 19 August 2022.
