= Rajvir Jawanda =

Indian singer and actor (1990–2025)

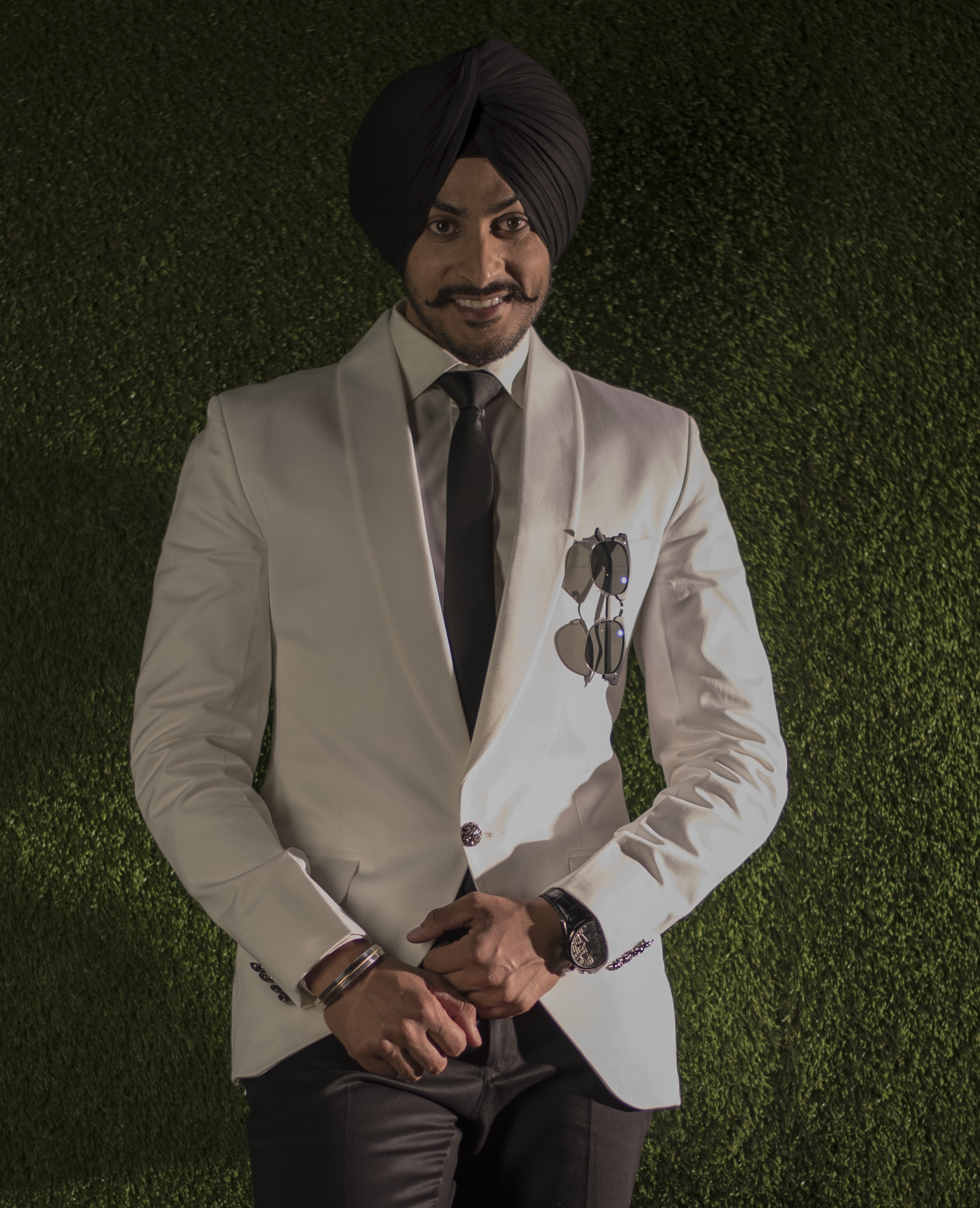

Background information
- Born: 20 June 1990; Jagraon, Ludhiana, Punjab, India
- Died: 8 October 2025 (aged 35) Fortis Hospital Mohali, Punjab, India
- Occupations: Singer, actor
- Years active: 2014 – 2025

Rajvir Jawanda (20 June 1990 – 8 October 2025) was an Indian singer and actor associated with Punjabi language music and films. He gained popularity with songs such as Kangani, Khush Reha Kar, and Hon Wala Sardar. He made his acting debut in Jind Jaan, which was released in 2019.

== Early life and career ==
Jawanda started his Punjabi music industry career in 2014. He became popular after his 2016 song Kali Jawande Di, followed by hits such as Khush Reha Kar, Sardari, Landlord, and Do Ni Sajna.

== Accident and death ==
On 27 September 2025, Jawanda was riding his motorcycle en route to Shimla when he lost control due to a fight between stray animals on the road near Baddi, Himachal Pradesh. He sustained severe head and spinal injuries and was initially treated at a hospital in Solan, before being transferred to Fortis Hospital, Mohali. His condition remained critical for 11 days, during which he was kept on ventilator support. He died at Fortis Hospital, Mohali on 8 October 2025, at the age of 35.

=== Public and industry reaction ===
Following news of his death, several Punjabi film and music industry figures expressed grief and condolences on social media. The incident sparked renewed discussion about road safety among Punjabi celebrities and fans. Ammy Virk, punjabi singer, performed on shows without any charges in place of Jawanda that were scheduled.

== Filmography ==
Year	Film	Role / Notes	Ref(s)
2018	Subedar Joginder Singh	Sipahi Bahadur Singh (supporting role)	
2019	Jind Jaan	Lead role	
2019	Mindo Taseeldarni		
2025	Yamla	Lead Role	

== Studio songs ==
Ban

Sardari

Surname

Kamla

Kesari Jhande
