= Jind Jaan =

2019 Punjabi film

- Directed by: Darshan Bagga
- Written by: Darshan Bagga
- Produced by: Pawan Aggarwal & Karan Aggarwal
- Starring: Rajvir Jawanda; Sara Sharmaa; Jaswinder Bhalla; Upasana Singh
- Cinematography: Ravi Chandran & Naren Gedia
- Edited by: Sanjay Sharma
- Music by: Gurmeet Singh
- Production company: BRS Films
- Release date: 14 June 2019
- Country: India
- Language: Punjabi

Jind Jaan is a 2019 Punjabi film starring Rajvir Jawanda and Sara Sharmaa. It tells the story of a Mama (Jaswinder Bhalla) and Ranjha who is his Bhanja (Rajvir Jawanda) who together travel to Thailand on a special mission. While in Thailand they meet a manager (Harby Sangha) of a very rich family, who introduces the duo to the family of Bhuji (Upasna Singh) and Juliet (Sara Sharmaa). While on their secret mission, Ranjha falls in love with Juliet and in comes the villain (Gaurav Kakkar) and a dangerous Don (Swatantra Bharat) The film was released on 14 June 2019.

== Cast ==
- Rajvir Jawanda as Ranjha
- Sara Sharmaa as Juliet
- Jaswinder Bhalla as Phuman Singh Ferozpuria
- Harby Sangha as Shamsher Singh
- Swatantra Bharat as Tochi, aka Tiger Don
- Upasana Singh as Sandy
- Gaurav Kakkar as Honey
- Guggu Gill as Friendly appearance
