= Vivek Ohri =

Indian Punjabi film producer

- Born: Vivek Ohri; 14 June 1974 (age 51); Jalandhar Punjab India
- Occupations: Producer, Financier Distributor
- Years active: 2009 - Present
- Known for: Punjabi Film Business
- Notable work: Jindua, Mukhtiar Chadha, Shareek [Dangar Doctor Jelly]

Vivek Ohri is a Punjabi film producer known for producing films like 'Dangar Doctor Jelly ', Jindua, Mukhtiar Chadha, Shareek, Viyah 70 KM, Yaar Anmulle, Jihne Mera Dil Luteya, Mel Karade Rabba via his production company Ohri Productions Pvt Ltd.

Born and brought up in Jalandhar, Ohri apart from running several other business went into film production in 2009 with his first film Mel Karade Rabba. Punjabi cinema actors he has worked with including Jimmy Shergill, Diljit Dosanjh, Neeru Bajwa, Mahie Gill and many more renowned stars.

Ohri also runs the music company Yellow Music, and the theatrical distribution company Globe Moviez Pvt Ltd.
