= Gol Gappe (film) =

2023 Indian Punjabi-language film

- Theatrical release poster
- Directed by: Smeep Kang
- Written by: Raju Verma (dialogues)
- Screenplay by: Shreya Srivastava; Vaibhav Suman
- Based on: Ramji Rao Speaking by Siddique–Lal
- Produced by: Pankaj Keshruwala; Ila Bedi Dutta; Vikas Agarwal; Bunty Raghav; Manik Bedi
- Starring: Binnu Dhillon; Rajat Bedi; B. N. Sharma; Ihana Dhillon; Navneet Kaur Dhillon
- Cinematography: Shiv Shakti
- Edited by: Rohit Dhiman
- Music by: Sukhbir Randhawa
- Production companies: Zee Studios; Triflix Entertainment LLP; Janvi Productions; Soham Rockstar Entertainment
- Distributed by: Zee Studios
- Release date: 17 February 2023
- Running time: 131 minutes
- Country: India
- Language: Punjabi

Gol Gappe is a 2023 Indian Punjabi-language comedy film directed by Smeep Kang. It stars Binnu Dhillon, Rajat Bedi, Ihana Dhillon, Navneet Kaur Dhillon and B. N. Sharma. The film is produced under the banner of Zee Studios, Triflix Entertainment LLP, Janvi Productions, Soham Rockstar Entertainment. The film is a remake of 1989 Malayalam film Ramji Rao Speaking.

== Synopsis ==
Three friends Jaggi, Pali and Nathuram run a fast-food outlet. Don of Punjab, Bagga kidnaps Dr. Chawla's wife and demands 10 lacs for compensation. A telecommunication mix up occurs and the call gets diverted to the Golgappe outlet.

== Cast ==
- Binnu Dhillon as Jaggi
- Rajat Bedi as Pali
- B. N. Sharma as Nathuram
- Ihana Dhillon
- Navneet Kaur Dhillon
- Dilawar Sidhu

== Release ==
The film was scheduled to release in April 2020 but was postponed due to COVID-19 lockdown in India. The film was finally released on 17 February 2023.
