= Chaali Din =

Punjabi Language Movie

- Directed by: Taranvir Singh Jagpal
- Written by: Dr. Gurpreet Singh Dhugga
- Starring: Debi Makhsoospuri; Gurpreet Ghuggi; Nirmal Rishi
- Release date: 19 June 2026
- Running time: 150 minutes
- Language: Punjabi

Chali Din (Punjabi: ਚਾਲੀ ਦਿਨ) is a Punjabi-language Indian film, which is based on the novel 'Chali Din' written by Dr. Gurpreet Singh Dhugga. The film is directed by Taranvir Singh Jagpal. It stars Debi Makhsoopuri, Gurpreet Ghuggi, Drishti Talwar and Sukhan Waraich in the lead roles. The film was released worldwide on 19 June 2026.
