= List of Punjabi films of the 2000s =

This is a list of Punjabi films of the 2000s.

== 2000 ==
Title	Director	Cast (Subject of documentary)	Genre	Notes	Release date
Bali Jatti		Saima, Shaan, Moammar Rana			
Charda Suraj		Shavinder Mahal, Suman Dutta, Shivani			
Dard Pardesaan Dey	Chander Mohan Nillay	Avinash Wadhawan, Upasna Singh, Paramvir, Deepshikha			
Ghabroo Punjab Da		Nazo, Shafqat Cheema			
Ishq Na Puche Jaat		Vishal Singh, Sheetal Bedi, Gurkirtan, B.N. Sharma			
Ishtehari Gujjar		Saima, Shaan, Moammar Rana			
Jatti Da wairr		Anjuman, Saud, Moamar			
Jug Mahi		Sana, Shaan, Anjuman			
Jugg Wala Mela	Parvez Rana	Saima, Shaan, Panna, Shafqat			
Long Da Lashkara		Anjuman, Saud, Sana			
Mehndi Waley Hath	Syed Noor	Saima, Moammar Rana, Babar Ali, Nirma	Romance, Drama		
Nooran		Saima, Moamar, Babur			
Peengan		Saima, Shaan, Moamar			
Reshman		Sana, Moamar, Sana			
Yaar Badshah		Saima, Shaan, Nargis			
Yaar Chan Warga		Saima, Shaan, Saud			
Yaar Maar	Yograj Singh	Yograj Singh, Neena Sandhu, Simran			

== 2001 ==
Title	Director	Cast (Subject of documentary)	Genre	Notes	Release date
Asoo Billa		Nargis, Shaan, Saud, Shafqat Cheema			
Allah Badshah		Saima, Shaan, Babur			
Badmash		Sana, Saud, Noor			
Badmash Gujjar		Saima, Shaan Shahid, Nirma, Moammar Rana			
Badmash Puttar		Saima, Shaan, Saud			
Chan Puttar		Shehzadi, Sardar Mohammad			
Dil Kach Da Khadona		Saiam, Moamar, Resham			
Gujjar 302		Saima, Shaan, Nozo			
Ghunda Tax		Saima, Shaan, Reema			
Hamayun Gujjar	Pervez Rana	Shaan, Moammar Rana, Saima Noor, Panna	Action, Drama		August 31
Ik Din Sher Da		Shezadi, Azam Jahangir			
Ik Jagga Hor		Saima, Shafqat Cheema			
Jagira	Sukhjinder Shera	Sukhjinder Shera, Gugni Gill, B.N. Sharma			
Khalsa Mero Roop Hai Khaas	Shyam Ralhan	Aaisha Jhulka, Avinash Wadhwan, Paramvir, Raymon Singh, Pramod Mouthu			
Makha Jat		Sana, Shaan, Babur			
Mehar Badshah		Sana, Shaan, Yousuf			
Mera Mahi		Reema, Saud, Sana			
Mukhra Chan Warga		Sana, Saud, Noor			
Nizam Lohar		Sana, Saud, Noor			
Shehnshah		Saima, Shaan, Nawaz			
Sher-e-Lahore		Saima, Shaan, Moamar			
Sikandera		Guggu Gill, Preeti Sapru, Yograj Singh, Bhagwant Mann, Deepika Singh, Malkit Singh Nahal			

== 2002 ==
Title	Director	Cast (Subject of documentary)	Genre	Notes	Release date
Achhu Sheedi		Saima, Shaan, Babur			
Allah Rakha		Saima, Shaan, Saud			
Araen Da Kharak		Yousuf, Saima, Shaan			
Atif Choudhary		Saima, Moamar Rana			
Babbu Khan		Saima, Shaan, Reema			
Badmash Te Qanoon		Sana, Shaan, Babur			
Billa		Meera, Lucky, Saud			
Buddha Gujjar	Syed Noor	Shaan, Resham, Saima	Action, Drama		6 December
Buddha Sher		Yousuf, Saima, Shaan			
Chan Mehar		Saima, Moamar Rana			
Charagh Bali		Sana, Shaan, Babur			
Dada Badmash		Yousuf, Saima, Shaan			
Dosa		Heera Malik, Resham			
Ik Gujjar So Badmash		Saima, Moamar Rana			
Jagga Tax		Saima, Shaan, Sana			
Jee Aayan Nu	Manmohan Singh	Harbhajan Mann, Priya Gill, Kimi Verma, Navneet Nishan		Bhushan Kumar, Krishan Kumar	
Jee O Jatta		Reema, Saud, Babur			
Kalu Shahpuria		Saima, Shaan, Meera			
Lahori Ghunda		Saima, Shaan, Babur			
Majhu Da Wair		Sana, Shaan, Reema			
Raju Rocket		Saima, Shaan, Moamar			
Rano Phaddebaz		Megha, Saud, Asha			
Sher-e-Azam		Saima, Shaan, Resham			
Sher-e-Pakistan		Saima, Shaan, Reema			
Tohfa Pyar Da		Resham, Shaan, Arbaz			
Waryam		Saima, Shaan, Babur			
Wehshi Jatt		Noor, Shaan, Badar Munir			
Zindagi Khoobsoorat Hai	Manoj Punj	Gurdas Mann, Tabu, Divya Dutta			

== 2003 ==
Title	Director	Cast (Subject of documentary)	Genre	Notes	Release date
Allah Nigehban		Reema, Saud, Babur			
Badla: The Revenge	Mukhtar Singh Mukha	Jaswinder Bhalla, Manjit Saini, Pritpal Kang, Pratap Rana, Gugu Gill, Resham Bhappa, Biloo Badshah, Lali Ghuman			12 August
Foja Amritsaria		Sana, Shaan, Reema			
Jatt Da Wair		Saima, Shaan, Reema			
Jeeva Gujjar		Heera Malik, Resham			
Khar Damagh Gujjar		Sultan Rahi			
Khamosh Pani	Sabiha Sumar	Kirron Kher, Shilpa Shukla	Drama		
Lara Punjab Da		Saima, Shaan, Sana			
Mehar Da Medan		Saima, Shaan, Babur			
Moula Sher		Yousuf, Saima, Shaan			
Pappu Lahoria		Saima, Shaan			
Remand		Saima, Moamar Rana			
Shagna De Mehndi		Sana, Shaan, Babur			
Sher Puttar		Sana, Shaan, Babur			
Ultimatum		Noor, Shaan, Badar Munir			

== 2004 ==
Title	Director	Cast (Subject of documentary)	Genre	Notes	Release date
Addi Tappa					
Asa Nu Maan Watna Da	Manmohan Singh	Harbhajan Mann, Kimi Verma, Neeru Bajwa, Kanwaljeet Singh, Deep Dhillon, Navneet Nishan, Gurpreet Ghuggi, Preet Cheema, Vivek Shauq, Sukhwinder Sukhi, Gurdeep Kaur Brar, Nirmaljeet Nijjer, Jagroop Shergill, Dara Nagra, Amritpal, Manav Vij			7 May
Bhola Sajan		Saima, Shaan, Babar Ali			
Billu Ghantagharia		Saima, Shaan, Babar Ali			
Curfew Order		Saima, Shaan, Moamar Rana			
Dehshat		Saima, Shaan, Moamar Rana			
Dushman Da Kharak		Sultan Rahi			
Guddo Badshah		Saima, Shaan, Moamar Rana			
Jabroo		Saima, Shaan, Moamar Rana			
Jaga Baloch		Saima, Shaan, Resham			
Jageer		Saima, Moammar Rana, Babar Ali			
Medan		Sana, Shaan, Babar Ali			
Mitter Pyare Nu Haal Mureedan Da Kehnai	Ratan Aulakh	Dara Singh, Rama Vij, Vindu Dara Singh, Sheeba, Rajeshwari Sachdev, Mukesh Rishi, Deep Dhillon, Navin Nischol, Akshay Kumar			
Mulla Muzaffar		Saima, Shaan, Moamar Rana			
Munna Bhai		Saima, Shaan, Babar Ali			
Nagri Daata Di		Saima, Shaan, Babar Ali			
Pagri Sanbhal Jatta		Sana, Moamar, Saud			
Perdesi Aye Watna Nu		Paro, Saud, Moamar			
Pind Di Kudi		Sarbjit Cheema, Rima, Sheeba Bhakri, Gurpreet Ghuggi, Veena Malik			
Sakhi Sultan		Saima, Shaan, Moamar Rana			
Wehshi Haseena		Sana, Shaan, Moamar Rana			
Zameen Kay Khuda	Masood Butt	Saima Noor, Moammar Rana	Drama		

== 2005 ==
Title	Director	Cast (Subject of documentary)	Genre	Notes	Release date
Bau Badmash		Saima, Moamar, Babar Ali			
Bhola Sunyara		Saima, Shaan, Saud, Aliya			
Des Hoyaa Pardes	Manoj Punj	Gurdas Maan, Juhi Chawla, Divya Dutta, Parmeet Sethi, Sudhir Pandey, Anup Soni, Madhumati, Gurkirtan, Deborah Delarado, Gogi Kohli, Maureen McDonough, Bidya Rao, Gurmeet Sajja			14 January
Kurian Shehar Dian		Saima, Shaan, Resham, Saud			
Nalaik	Ravi Nishad	Bobby Deol (special appearance), Gugu Gill, Vivek Shauq, Aarti Puri, Jaspal Bhatti, Vijay Tandon, Kulbir Bandesaro, Jagtar Jaggi, Gurpreet Ghuggi, Harbhajan Jabbal, Jatinder Kaur			
Pappu Shehzada		Saima, Shaan, Shafqat Cheema			
Pind Di Kurhi	Sukhwant Dhadda	Sarbjit Cheema, Veena Malik	Romance, Comedy		
Sheru Badshah		Khusbu, Shafqat Cheema, Tariq Shah			
Sohna Yaar Punjabi		Sana, Shamyl Khan, Babar Ali			
Wada Chodhary		Saima, Shaan, Babar Ali			
Yaaran Naal Baharan	Manmohan Singh	Raj Babbar, Jimmy Shergill, Juhi Babbar, Anupam Kher, Sunita Dhir, Ketki Dave, Gurpreet Ghuggi, Sonika Gill, Gavie Chahal, Sudeepa Singh			
Ziddi Rajput	Sangeeta	Sana, Shaan, Saud, Laila, Saima Khan	Action		12 August

== 2006 ==
Title	Director	Cast (Subject of documentary)	Genre	Notes	Release date
Anokhe Amar Shaheed Baba Deep Singh	Jaswinder Chahal	Vindu Dara Singh, Deep Dhillon, Kashish, Afzal Khan, Gurpreet Singh, Murali A Lalwani, Gurinder Makna, Sandip Singh, Jaswant Saggo (Jas), Rajwinder Singh Hundel			28 July
Athra		Sana, Shaan, Saud, Saima Khan			
Baghi	Sukhminder Dhanjal	Om Puri, Girja Shankar, Parmveer Singh, Gurleen Chopra, Devinder Daman, Gaj Deol, Sardar Sohi, Jaswant Daman, Aneeta, Hardeep Doll			10 February
Butt Badshah		Saima, Shaan, Moamar Rana, Resham			
Chann Badshah		Saima, Shaan			
Dil Apna Punjabi	Manmohan Singh	Harbhajan Mann, Neeru Bajwa, Mahek Chahal, Deep Dhillon, Sunita Dhir, Gurpreet Ghuggi, Rana Ranbir, Dara Singh, Kanwaljit Singh, Amar Noorie			
Ibba		Shaan, Saima, Moammar Rana			
Ik Jind Ik Jaan	Chitraarth	Raj Babbar, Nagma, Aryan Vaid, Mighty Gill, Prabhleen Kaur, Arun Bakshi, Kulbir Bederson, Deep Dhillon, Gurpreet Ghuggi, Harbhajan Jabbal, Donny Kapoor, Jatinder Kaur, Rahul, Pammi Sandhu, Seetu, B.N. Sharma, Kuldip Sharma, Ritu Shivpuri, Prabheen Singh, Smeep Kang			1 December
Kangan		Sana, Shaan, Ahmad Butt, Jan Rambo			
Lahori Shehzadey		Sana, Shaan, Saud, Veena Malik			
Mahi Aawe Ga		Sana, Shahid Khan, Babrak Shah		Pashto film actor Shahid Khan's first Punjabi film as a hero.	
Mannat	Gurbir Singh Grewal	Jimmy Shergill, Kulraj Randhawa, Manav Vij, Surinder Bath, Deep Dhillon, Rupinder Kaur, Anita Shabdish, Tarsinder Singh, Ramit Walia, Kanwaljit Singh			6 October
Main Tu Assi Tussi		Kulbhushan Kharbanda, Manmeet, Upasana Singh, Rakesh Bedi, Sunita Dhir, Rana Jung Bahadar			
Majajan	Syed Noor	Shaan Shahid, Saima Noor, Madiha Shah	Musical, Drama		6 January
Mehndi Wale Hath	Harinder Gill	Gugu Gill, Manjeet Kullar, Gavie Chahal, Goldie, Sukhi Pawar, Prabhleen Kaur, Sania, Rana Ranbir, Gurkirtan			
Pappu Badmasha Da		Saima, Shaan			
Pappu Gujjar		Saima, Shaan, Moamar Rana, Meera			
Qaidi Yaar		Saima, Shaan, Babar Ali			
Rabb Ne Banaiyan Jodiean		Babbu Mann, Jajj Pandher, Doney Kapoor, Punit Issar, Gurpreet Ghuggi, Nilofar			
Rustam-e-Hind	JS Cheema	Parminder Doomchheri, Shivender Mahal, Doney Kapoor, Guggu Gill, BB Verma			
Sharif Gujjar		Sana, Shaan, Saud, Saima Khan			
Yaar Badmash		Saima, Shaan, Saud, Babar Ali			
Waris Shah: Ishq Daa Waaris		Gurdas Mann, Juhi Chawla, Divya Dutta, Sushant Singh, Gurkirtan			

== 2007 ==
Title	Director	Cast (Subject of documentary)	Genre	Notes	Release date
Achhu Lahoria		Nargis, Shaan, Saud, Shafqat Cheema			
Ajj Da Badmash		Saima, Shaan, Tariq Shah, Shafqat			
Bala Badmash		Saima, Shaan, Moamar Rana, Shafqat			
Billo 302		Nargis, Shaan, Babar Ali, Jan Rambo			
Ghunda No. 1		Saima, Shaan, Nida Chodhary			
Ghundi Run	Pervez Rana	Nargis, Shaan, Naghma, Sajna	Action		
Manga Gujjar		Saima, Shaan, Moamar Rana, Shafqat			
Mitti Wajaan Maardi	Manmohan Singh	Harbhajan Mann, Japji Khera, Mahi Gill, Kanwaljit Singh, Deep Dhillon	Drama	Manmohan Singh	14 September
Mohabbataan Sachiyaan	Shahzad Rafique	Veena Malik, Babrak Shah, Adnan Khan, Maria Khan	Romance, Drama		14 October
Murshid Badshah		Sana, Haidar Sultan, Arbaz Khan, Shafqat			
Nasha Jawani Da		Saima, Shaan, Sana, Shafqat Cheema			
Puttar Hamayun Gujjar Da		Nargis, Shaan, Mustafa Qureshi			
Puttar Shahiye Da		Sana, Shaan, Saud, Saima Khan			
Sajna Ve Sajna		Bally Sagoo, Preeti Jhangiani, Daljeet Kaur, Dalip Tahil	Drama		19 October
Soha Jora	Pervez Rana	Nargis, Shaan, Shafqat Cheema			4 May
Vidroh		Gugu Gill, Manjeet Kullar	Drama		
Wagah		Kashish Kaur, Ranjeet, Hans Raj Hans, Sudesh Lehri	Drama		
Wehshi Rajput		Nargis, Shaan, Shafqat Cheema			

== 2008 ==
Title	Director	Cast (Subject of documentary)	Genre	Notes	Release date
Punjab	Inderpal Singh	Bunty Singh, Gavie Chahal, Sukhi Pawar, Milind Gunaji, Raza Murad, Arun Bakshi		Bunty Singh	18 January
Yaariyan	Deepak Grewal	Gurdas Mann, Gulshan Grover, Bhoomika Chawla, Om Puri, Okuku Wanyama, Raj Toora, Harjinder Singh Thind, Asrani, Farida Jalal	Romance Drama	Pinky Basrao	25 January
Kaun Kise Da Beli	Jagtar Singh	Preet Brar, Preet Madhan, Kamal Brar, B.N. Sharma, Gurkirtan, Mohd. Sadiq, Jagtar Jaggi, Kartar Cheema, Sunny Sandhu, Dr. Surinder Sharma		Iqbal Singh Dhillon	
Babal Da Vehra	Harbux Latta	Malkiat Singh, Yograj Singh, Avtar Gill, Sarabjit Mangat, Jaswant Daman, Jaswinder Bhalla, Dolly Malkiat, Arpita Sanghera, Sandeep Malhi, Giordan Rana	Drama		5 May
Basanti	Hassan Askari	Shaan, Saima Noor, Shamil Khan	Drama		
Gulabo	Sangeeta	Shaan, Saima Noor, Resham			
Majaajan	Ravinder Ravi	Gavie Chahal, Sunny Cheema	Drama	Sukhwinder Paul singh	6 June
Vilaitiya		Balvir Boparai			18 July
Lakh Pardesi Hoiye		Julie Bir, Gracy Singh, Rajat Bedi, Kulbhushan Kharbanda, Aarti Puri	Drama		22 August
Mera Pind	Manmohan Singh	Harbhajan Mann, Kimi Verma, Navjot Singh Sidhu, Guggu Gill, Gurpreet Ghuggi, Deep Dhillon, Navneet Nishan, Rana Ranbir, Sarabjit Mangat, Sheeba Bhakri, Darshan Aulakh	Romance, Drama		5 September
Hashar	Gaurav Trehan	Babbu Mann, Gurleen Chopra, Mahima Mehta, Sudesh Lehri, Rana Ranbir, Gurkirtan	Romance	Lucky Dhindsa	26 September
Heaven on Earth	Deepa Mehta	Preity Zinta, Vansh Bhardwaj, Baljinder Johal, Rajinder Singh Cheema, Ramanjit Kaur, Gourrav Sihan, Orville Maciel, Geetkia Sharma	Drama	David Hamilton	24 October
Sat Sri Akal	Kamal Sahni	Kimi Verma, Manpreet Singh, Arun Bali, Dolly Minhas, Avtar Singh Gill, Vivek Shauq, Nirmal Rishi, Manmeet Singh, Neelu Kohli, Sonpreet, Pooja Tandon		K.S. Kohli	7 November
Wattanaan Ton Door	Rajan Lyallpur	Avinash Wadhawan, Gursewak Mann, Vivek Shauq, Upasana Singh, Deep Dhillon, Raza Murad, Sandeep Kaur, Ekta Trivedi, Sarhanjeet Singh, Shreya Soni, Arun Bakshi, Abbhay Bharghav, Kulbir Wadesron, Kiran Bharghav, Poonam Mishra, Raju Sherestha, Jaswinder, Chhaya, Sujit Rajput, Ashwini Bharadwaj, Nirmal Pandey, Tinaa Ghaai	Drama	Manmohan Singh, Ratan Bhatia	28 November
Jameen Jatt Di Jaan	P.Pal Verma	Daljeet Kaur, Parminder, Upasana Singh, Gajendra Chauhan, Satyen Kappu, Yash Sharma, Priya Nijhar, Jatinder Jeetu, Gurkirtan	Action	Eid-ul-Azha	1 December
Chak De Phatte	Smeep Kang	Smeep Kang, Mahie Gill, Jaspal Bhatti, Savita Bhatti, Vivek Shauq, Jaswinder Bhalla, Gurpreet Ghuggi, B.N. Sharma, Amit Dhawan, Gauri, Upasana Singh	Comedy	Devinder Sandhu	5 December
Chan Badshah	Muhammad Rasheed Malik	Saima, Moammar Rana, Nirma, Babar Ali, Arbaaz Khan	Action		
Zill-e-Shah	Shaan	Shaan, Saima, Noor	Drama		

== 2009 ==
Sr. No.	Title	Director	Cast	Genre	Release date (Tentative)	Producer	Ref.
1	Jag Jeondeyan De Mele	Baljit Singh Deo	Harbhajan Mann, Tulip Joshi, Gurpreet Ghuggi, Puneet Issar, Gulzar Inder Singh Chahal	Romance	20 February 2009	Gulzar Inder Singh Chahal, Harbhajan Mann, Surinder Sanghera, Gurwinderpal Singh Sanghera	
2	Tera Mera Ki Rishta	Navnait Singh	Jimmy Shergill, Kulraj Randhawa, Anupam Kher, Archana Puran Singh, Raj Babbar, Gurpreet Ghuggi, Akshita Vasudeva, Dolly Mattoo, Rana Ranbir, Binnu Dhillon, Tee Jay Sidhu, Khushboo Grewal	Romance	10 April 2009	Mukesh Sharma, Spice Cine Vision	
3	Mini Punjab	Rimpy-Prince	Gurdas Maan, Manav Vij, Jividha Sharma, Ehsaan Khan, Vivek Shauq		17 April 2009	Kuljinder Singh Sidhu	
4	Munde U.K. De	Manmohan Singh	Jimmy Shergill, Amrinder Gill, Neeru Bajwa, Gurpreet Ghuggi, Akshita Vasudeva, Deep D22 Mhillon, Arun Bali		8 May 2009		
5	Lagda Ishq Hogaya	Sameep Kang	Roshan Prince, Rana Ranbir, Ghule Shah	Love	22 May 2009	Raj Kakra	
6	Luv U Bobby	Yograj Singh, Gurinder Dimpy	Gugu Gill, Yograj Singh, Poonam, Vikram Sidhu, Gurkirtan, Binnu Dhillon		12 June 2009	Gurbir Sandhu	
7	Punjab Gold	Raj Kumar	Sunny Deol, Preity Zinta				
8	Punnyan Di Raat	Santosh Dandekar	Vijay Khepad, J P Dutta, Jatinder Kaur, Harbhajan Jabbal	Horror	7 August 2009	Vijat Khepar	
9	Apni Boli Apna Des	Ravinder Peepat	Sarabjeet Cheema, Raj Babbar, Shweta Tiwari, Manav Vij, Simran Sachdev, Vivek Shauq, Upasna Singh, Sunita Dhir, Rana Jung Bahadur Gurpreet Ghuggi, Mona		28 August 2009	Sarabjeet Cheema, Amarjit Cheema, Bhupinder Singh Bhinda	
10	Akhiyaan Udeekdian	Mukesh Gautam	Lakhwinder Wadali, Harpreet Hanjrah, Gugu Gill, Nirmal Rishi, Gurkirtan, Neeta Mohindra, Sukhbir Razia, Satwant Kaur, Richi Bawa, Sudesh Lehri, Rana Ranbir, Sukhwinder Sukhi, Jagtar Jaggi, Sanjiv Atri, Gauri	Social Drama-Romance	2 October 2009	Davinder Kumar, Gaurav Bagai, Navtej Sandhu	
11	Siyasat	Sarabjit Beniwal		Action	30 October 2009	Sarabjit Beniwal	
12	Heer Ranjha	Harjeet Singh	Sarabjeet Singh, Neeru Bajwa, Sameep Kang, Guggu Gill, Jasbir Jassi, Harmeet Durra, Diljeet Kaur, Shawendar Maahal, Gursharan Mann	Romance	13 November 2009	Gulzar Inder Singh Chahal, Harbhajan Mann	
13	Channo	Sukhpal Sidhu	Jaskaran Bawa, J P Dutta, Gurkirtan, B N Sharma, Rana Jang Bahadur, Kamaljeet Kaur, Gurdev Dhillon, Baldev Deo, Nindi Dhillon, Prakash Gadhoo, Amrit Billa, Pali Mangat, Anita Mit, Ms Monu Singh, Gurwinder saran, Sukhpal Sidhu		27 November 2009	Sukhpal Sidhu	
