= Ik Kudi Punjab Di =

IK KUDI PUNJAB DI
- Official poster
- Directed by: Manmohan Singh
- Written by: Manmohan Singh; Rana Ranbir
- Produced by: Manmohan Singh; Ratan Bhatia
- Starring: Amrinder Gill; Jaspinder Cheema; Aman Dhaliwal; Gugu Gill; Gurpreet Ghuggi; Rana Ranbir
- Cinematography: Manmohan Singh
- Edited by: Bunty Nagi
- Music by: Sukshinder Shinda
- Release date: 17 September 2010
- Country: India
- Language: Punjabi

Ik Kudi Punjab Di is a 2010 Indian Punjabi film directed by Manmohan Singh with story and screenplay by Singh and dialogues by Rana Ranbir. The film is produced by Singh and Ratan Bhatia and stars Amrinder Gill, Jaspinder Cheema, Aman Dhaliwal, Gugu Gill, Gurpreet Ghuggi, Rana Ranbir, and Kimi Verma.

Ik Kudi Punjab Di released on 17 September 2010 globally.

== Plot ==
Ik Kudi Punjab Di tells a richly textured tale from a keenly female perspective set against the backdrop of male-dominated Punjabi society. It does so with a Shakespearean credo of "all the world’s a stage" and a lively cast.

SP Singh (Amrinder Gill) is a boy from a wealthy family who meets Navdeep (Jaspinder Cheema), the girl of his dreams, at his college drama class. They quickly bond, much to the chagrin of bad-boy student Vicky (Aman Dhaliwal) who prizes Navdeep for himself.

The male-chauvinist Vicky has no chance with the progressive-minded Navdeep. Even Singh, the man who she admires enough to call a friend, is in for a shock. Navdeep doesn't want to get married; she's intent on being the guardian of her loving parents because the family lacks a male heir.

Singh tests his own view of women by agreeing to all of Navdeep's demands, including becoming a ghar jamai. This is seen as both revolutionary (by her classmates) and an affront to Punjabi society and tradition.

== Cast ==
- Amrinder Gill as SP (Sehajpal) Singh
- Jaspinder Cheema as Navdeep Sidhu
- Surbhi Jyoti as Gurmeet Kaur
- Gugu Gill as Professor Gill
- Gurpreet Ghuggi as Bawa/Laali Baba
- Rana Ranbir
- Kanwaljit Singh as Sehajpal's Father
- Deep Dhillon as Sukhdev Singh
- Navneet Nishan
- Kimi Verma as Laali
- Aman Dhaliwal as Param Dhillon
- Neeta Mahindra
- Balwinder Begowal
- Tarshinder Soni
- Sukhbir Razia
- Surinder Sharma
- Niyamat Kaur as Roshni
- Karamjit Brar as Haryanvi Boy

== Music ==
Ik Kudi Punjab Di

Soundtrack album by Sukshinder Shinda, Amrinder Gill
- Released: 12 August 2010
- Genre: Punjabi, Bhangra
- Label: Speed Records (India); Moviebox (UK)
- Producer: Sukshinder Shinda

Sukshinder Shinda, Amrinder Gill chronology
Munde U.K. De (2009)	Ik Kudi Punjab Di (2010)	Ajj Nachna (2012)

The soundtrack album was released on Speed Records in India and Moviebox in the UK. The UK album artwork featured the stars of the film, Amrinder Gill and Jaspinder Cheema, instead of the supporting characters pictured on the Indian cover artwork.

The music of Ik Kudi Punjab Di was praised by audiences and critics alike. Singh Speaks particularly praised it by calling this album very good. Punjabi Portal also praised the album saying that the great music further increases the expectation from the film.

In October 2010, Amrinder Gill scored a Top 30 hit in the UK on the official Asian Download Chart with the lead track from the film, "Sochan Vich."

Track	Song	Singer(s)	Lyrics	Duration
1	"Sochan Vich"	Amrinder Gill	Amardeep Singh Gill & Jitt Salala	4:23
2	"Ik Kudi Punjab Di"	Sukshinder Shinda & Amrinder Gill	Amardeep Singh Gill	4:08
3	"Pyar Lai Ke"	Amrinder Gill	Amardeep Singh Gill	4:47
4	"Salaaman"	Amrinder Gill	Jhalman Singh Dhanda & Rana Madojhandia	4:02
5	"Tera Mera Na"	Amrinder Gill & Pamela Jain	Nimma Loharka	5:13
6	"Dhin Tak Dhin"	Amrinder Gill, Labh Janjua, Rana Ranbir, Arvinder Singh & Bobby Sandhu	Rana Ranbir	4:18
7	"Gal Teri"	Amrinder Gill	Harjit Sidaki	3:55
8	"Socha Vich" Remix	Amrinder Gill	Amardeep Singh Gill & Jitt Salala	3:33
