= Ni Main Sass Kuttni =

2022 Indian film by Parveen Kumar

- Theatrical release poster
- Directed by: Parveen Kumar
- Written by: Balwinder Singh Janjua; Harvir Singh Mangat; Aman Sidhu
- Produced by: Mohit Banwait; Ankush Gupta
- Starring: Gurpreet Ghuggi; Nisha Bano; Sunny Gill
- Cinematography: Syed Tanveer Reyaz
- Edited by: Vinay Pal
- Music by: Simran Goraya
- Release date: 29 April 2022
- Country: India
- Language: Punjabi

Ni Main Sass Kuttni is a 2022 Indian Punjabi-language comedy-drama film directed by Parveen Kumar. The film stars Gurpreet Ghuggi, Nisha Bano and Sunny Gill. Produced by Mohit Banwait, the film explores the humorous and emotional dynamics between mothers-in-law and daughters-in-law in Punjabi families.

The title is inspired by the traditional Punjabi Boli Ni Mai Sass Kuttni, which is commonly sung during wedding celebrations in Punjab.

== Plot ==
When a young man decides to marry the woman he loves, his mother strongly disapproves of the match. Determined to make her new daughter-in-law's life difficult, she sets out to assert her dominance in the household. However, her plans backfire when the daughter-in-law responds boldly, leading to a series of comedic situations.

== Cast ==
- Gurpreet Ghuggi
- Nirmal Rishi
- Nisha Bano
- Mehtab Virk
- Tanvi Nagi
- Anita Devgan
- Karamjit Anmol
- Satwant Kaur
- Sunny Gill

== Production ==
The film was written by Balwinder Singh Janjua, Harvir Singh Mangat and Aman Sidhu. Cinematography was handled by Syed Tanveer Reyaz, while Vinay Pal served as the editor. The soundtrack was composed by Simran Goraya. Several cast members and crew shared production updates and promotional material during filming and marketing stages.

== Release ==
Ni Main Sass Kuttni was released theatrically on 29 April 2022. Punjab State Commission For Women reportedly reviewed or commented on aspects of the film prior to release, noting its family-centric themes.

== Reception ==
Jaspreet Nijher of The Times of India rated the film 3/5 stars and wrote, "A light entertainer and good watch [...] The music is entertaining and melodious, though the narrative gets repetitive and drags a little towards the end."
