= Asa Nu Maan Watna Da =

- Official poster of the film
- Directed by: Manmohan Singh
- Written by: Manmohan Singh
- Produced by: Preetpal Singh Shergill, Davinder Lidher, Samit Brar
- Starring: Harbhajan Mann; Kimi Verma; Navneet Nishan; Neeru Bajwa
- Release date: 7 May 2004
- Running time: 179 minutes
- Country: India
- Language: Punjabi

Asa Nu Maan Watna Da (transl. We are proud of our country) is an Indian Punjabi-language film directed by Manmohan Singh, released on 7 May 2004 and starring Harbhajan Mann.

== Plot ==
Calgary-based businessman Kanwaljit Singh Dhillon sends money home to his brother, Deep, to invest in some property. With his wife, son, Mehr, and medical-student daughter, Aman, he returns home to Kapurthala to live with Deep for a year. They are very well received by Deep and his wife, Harbans, with Mehr and Aman both finding life partners in the outspoken Paali and Dr. Balvinder. Things change dramatically after Kanwaljit announces that he will not be returning to Canada, and will reside there permanently.

== Cast ==
- Harbhajan Mann as Meher
- Kimi Verma as Rajal
- Neeru Bajwa as Arshveer Bajwa
- Manav Vij Dr. Balwinder
- Kanwaljit Singh
- Deep Dhillon
- Navneet Nishan - Harbans
- Vivek Shauq - Swami Ji
- Gurpreet Ghuggi
- Preet Cheema
- Harby Sangha

== Soundtrack ==
Asan Nu Mann Watna Da

Soundtrack album by Jaidev Kumar
- Released: 19 March 2004
- Genre: Feature film soundtrack
- Length: 36:41
- Label: T-Series
- Producer: Jaidev Kumar

Jaidev Kumar chronology
Jee Aayan Nu (2002)	Asan Nu Mann Watna Da (2004)	Yaaran Naal Baharan (2005)

The music of the film was composed by Jaidev Kumar.

Original Hindi tracklist
No.	Title	Lyrics	Singer(s)	Length
1.	"Nach Le Gaa Le"	Harbhajan Mann	Harbhajan Mann	6:00
2.	"Yaara O Dildaara"	Babu Singh Mann, Gill Surjit	Harbhajan Mann, Sunidhi Chauhan	7:35
3.	"Long Gavaiyan"	Babu Singh Mann, Gill Surjit	Jaspinder Narula, Harbhajan Mann	7:42
4.	"Lohri"	Babu Singh Mann	Harbhajan Mann, Jaspinder Narula, Arvinder Singh, Simerjit Kumar, Parmela Jain	6:51
5.	"Ankhiyan Vich"	Babu Singh Mann, Gill Surjit	Harbhajan Mann	5:13
6.	"Lae Maate"	Babu Singh Mann	Harbhajan Mann	7:29
7.	"Nach Le Gaa Le (Indian version)"	Harbhajan Mann	Harbhajan Mann	3:51
