= Aman Dhaliwal =

Indian model-turned-actor

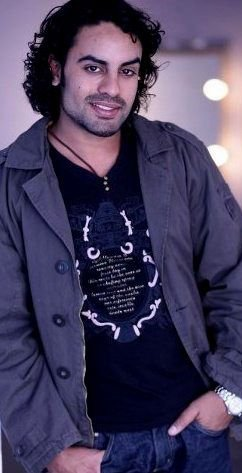
- Born: Amandeep Singh Dhaliwal; 24 July 1986 (age 40); Mansa, India
- Occupations: Actor; Model
- Years active: 2003–present

Aman Singh Dhaliwal (born 24 July 1986) is an Indian model-turned-actor, who works in Punjabi cinema, where he is known as an action hero. He is from the city of Mansa, Punjab. Best known for his changing looks with each role, he has also worked in Bollywood, Pakistani and Telugu films.

== Early life and background ==
Aman Dhaliwal was born to Mithu Singh Kahneke and Gurtej Kaur Dhaliwal, both teachers. The family belongs to the religion of Sikhism. He spent his young life in Mansa, a small rural town in Punjab, India, where he attended and completed his elementary and secondary education at Khalsa High School. He received his bachelor's degree in radiology and Masters in Hospital administration from a Medical college in Delhi, India.

In March, 2023, Aman was allegedly attacked and injured outside of a gym in Corona, CA, by a man wielding a knife. The attacker was overpowered and finally arrested by the Police. He had been attacked before in 2015 on his way from Ludhiana to his hometown.

== Acting career ==
Aman Dhaliwal was discovered by a modeling agent in a hair saloon in Delhi. He started his modeling career in the songs Jaan Jaan by Balkar Sidhu and Jogiya by Romey Gill (2003). His acting career started with Jodha Akbar under the direction of Ashutosh Gowarikar. Dhaliwal has worked under a variety of directors including Gurbir Grewal, Pankaj Batra and Manmohan Singh/Manji.

== Filmography ==
Year	Movie	Role	Language	Notes
2007	Big Brother	Home Minister's son	Hindi	
2008	Jodhaa Akbar	Rajkumar Ratan Singh	Hindi	
2009	Coffee House	Dinesh	Hindi	
2010	Khaleja	John	Telugu	
2010	Virsa	Aaman Ali	Punjabi	Pakistani film
2010	Ik Kudi Punjab Di	Param Dhillon	Punjabi	
2012	Ajj De Ranjhe	Aambar	Punjabi	
2013	Jatt Boys - Putt Jattan De	Waris	Punjabi	
2016	Saka - The Martyrs of Nankana Sahib		Punjabi	
2022	Anth The End		Hindi	
2025 2026	Romeo S3 Dastar || Jayant Makhija Sandeep (sandy) ||		Hindi	

== Television ==
Year	Title	Role	Notes
2016	Ishq Ka Rang Safed	Teman Viplap	
2017-2018	Porus	Shiv Dutt	
2018	Vighnaharta Ganesh	Bhandasur	

== Modeling ==
Year	Work	Singer	Album
2003	Jogiya Ve Jogiya Ve Jogiya	Romey Gill	Teri Jogan Hogayi ve
2003	Jaan Jaan	Balkar Sidhu	Laung
2006	Jatt lutiya Gya	Ravinder Ravi	Jatt Lutiya Gaya
2007	Tere Ute Mar Mitti/Sohni Soorat Waliya	Balkar Sidhu	Chubare Vali Bari
2008	Gallat Hai	Reenie	Nayee Subah
2009	Tabahiyan	Tajinder Mann	Style
2009	Yaariyan	Jazzy B & Sukhshinder Shinda	Yaariyan
