= Gelo (film) =

- Gelo movie poster
- Directed by: Manbhavan Singh
- Written by: Ram Sarup Ankhi, Manbhawan Singh
- Based on: Gelo by Ram Sarup Ankhi
- Produced by: Nidhi M Singh; Surinder Singh Sodhi
- Starring: Jaspinder Cheema, Pavan Malhotra, Gurjit Singh, Dilavar Sidhu, Aditya Sharma, Raj Dhaliwal
- Cinematography: Jatinder Sairaj
- Edited by: Mahesh Pakhare
- Music by: Umar Sheikh
- Production companies: Celebration Studioz; Sonark Solutions
- Release date: 5 August 2016
- Countries: India, Canada
- Language: Punjabi

Gelo is an Indian Punjabi-language drama film based on the Punjabi novel Gelo written by doyen of Punjabi literature, Late Ram Sarup Ankhi. The film is directed by Manbhavan Singh. Produced by Celebration Studioz and Sonark Solutions, it features Jaspinder Cheema and Gurjit Singh in the lead roles. The music is composed by Umar Sheikh. The film was released worldwide on 5 August 2016.

== Synopsis ==
Gelo is the story of a girl whose name is Gurmel Kaur. She belongs to the Malwa belt of Punjab. The movie presents the problems of the farmers living in the Malwa belt of Punjab.

== Cast ==
- Jaspinder Cheema as Gelo
- Pavan Malhotra as Balwant Singh
- Gurjit Singh as Raama
- Gurpreet Bhangu as Raama's mother
- Dilavar Sidhu as Jagtar
- Aditya Tarnach
- Raj Dhaliwal

== Music ==
No.	Title	Lyrics	Music	Singer(s)	Length
1.	"Kamli"	Raj Hans	Umar Shaikh	Richa Sharma	03:41
2.	"Tappe"	Raj Hans	Umar Shaikh	Tarannum Mallik	03:20
3.	"Rang Chadheya"	Raj Hans	Umar Shaikh	Javed Ali & Tarannum Mallik	04:36
