= Singh of Festival =

- Directed by: Gurdev Rehman
- Produced by: Darshan Singh Grewal
- Starring: Roshan Prince; Mahie Gill; Gurpreet Ghuggi; Dharmendra; Disha Parmar; Jaswinder Bhalla
- Cinematography: Dheeraj Rattan
- Music by: Tru-Skool; Gupsy Aujla
- Distributed by: Angel Records; Dharam Seva Records
- Release date: 15 May 2015
- Country: India
- Language: Punjabi

Singh of Festival is a 2015 Sikh devotional film from Punjab. It stars Roshan Prince, Mahie Gill, Gurpreet Ghuggi, Dharmendra, Disha Parmar and Jaswinder Bhalla, with music composed and performed by Tru-Skool and Gupsy Aujla.

== Cast ==
- Roshan Prince as Taru Singh
- Mahie Gill as Mata Gujri Kaur
- Gurpreet Ghuggi as Mani Singh
- Dharmendra as Bhai Dyala Singh
- Jaswinder Bhalla as Banda Singh Bahadur
- Wamiqa Gabbi as Mata Gujar Kaur
- B.N. Sharma as Jassa Singh Ahluwalia
- Karamjit Anmol as Bhai Sati Das
- Kulwinder Billa (as himself)
- Kamal Khan (as himself)
- Geeta Zaildar (as himself)
- Lehmber Hussainpuri (as himself)

== Soundtrack ==
Singh Of Festival (Music Album)

Soundtrack album by Roshan Prince, Kamal Khan, Kulwinder Billa, Ritu Pathak, Lehmber Hussainpuri, Geeta Zaildar
- Released: 25 March 2015
- Genre: Film soundtrack
- Length: 0:46:42
- Labels: Javeed Rajput Sid JRS Music; Dharam Seva Records
- Producer: Anup Kumar

All lyrics are written by Happy Raikoti, Narinder Bath, Pirti Silon, Jhalaman Singh Dhanda, Gurminder Maddoke, Koki Deep; all music is composed by Tru-Skool & Gupsy Aujla.

Track Listing
| No. | Title | Lyrics | Music | Artist | Length |
|---|---|---|---|---|---|
| 1. | "Singh Of Festival" | Koki Deep | Tru-Skool | Roshan Prince | 00:05:17 |
| 2. | "Shaheed Udham Singh" | Gurminder Maddoke | Tru-Skool | Roshan Prince | 00:04:23 |
| 3. | "Nanak Da Seva" | Happy Raikoti | Tru-Skool | Roshan Prince | 00:04:43 |
| 4. | "Khalsa Ji" | Jhalaman Singh Dhanda | Tru-Skool | Kamal Khan | 00:05:39 |
| 5. | "Guru Tegh Bahadur Ji" | Pirti Silon | Gupsy Aujla | Roshan Prince & Kulwinder Billa | 00:06:05 |
| 6. | "Langar" | Happy Raikoti | Gupsy Aujla | Geeta Zaildar & Lehmber Hussainpuri | 00:04:02 |
| 7. | "Sardar" | Gurminder Maddoke | Tru-Skool | Roshan Prince | 00:05:09 |
| 8. | "Kaur Vich Kudiye" | Narinder Bath | Tru-Skool | Ritu Pathak | 00:04:56 |
| 9. | "Bole So Nihaal" | Happy Raikoti | Tru-Skool | Roshan Prince, Kulwinder Billa, Kamal Khan, Lehmber Hussainpuri | 00:05:51 |
| Total length: | | | | | 00:46:42 |
