= Pata Nahi Rabb Kehdeyan Rangan Ch Raazi =

- Directed by: Ravinder Peepat
- Screenplay by: Harman
- Story by: Harman
- Produced by: Harman and Jasmeet Singh Judge Films Production Pvt. Ltd.
- Starring: Neeru Bajwa, Tarun Khanna, Gurpreet Ghuggi, Amar Noorie, Rana Ranbir, Sunita Dhir
- Edited by: Omkar Nath Bhakri
- Music by: Jaidev Kumar
- Distributed by: White Hill Studios
- Release date: 17 February 2012 (India)
- Country: India
- Language: Punjabi
- Budget: ₹20 million (US$240,000)
- Box office: ₹22 million (US$260,000)

Pata Nahi Rabb Kehdeyan Rangan Ch Raazi (Punjabi: ਪਤਾ ਨਹੀਂ ਰੱਬ ਕਿਹੜਿਆਂ ਰੰਗਾਂ ’ਚ ਰਾਜ਼ੀ) is a 2012 Punjabi film starring Neeru Bajwa, Tarun Khanna, Gurpreet Ghuggi, Amar Noorie in lead roles. It's directed by Ravinder Peepat and Produced by Harman and Jasmeet Singh Judge Films Production Pvt. Ltd. The film is released by Kapil Batra Films Production House.

The film was originally scheduled for release in 2011 and the soundtrack was released in August 2011. The film was released on 17 February 2012 through Kapil Batra Films.

== Synopsis ==
Pata Nahi Rabb Kehdeyan Rangan Ch Raazi is the story of Harman, his life, his struggle and his dreams. His dream is to see his ailing parents happy and healthy and to get Simran as his life partner who hails from a very rich family.

Ashamed of his poverty, he leaves India and reaches Bangkok to rise in life. His life takes a fortunate turn in Bangkok with the help of hotelier, Gurvinder and his pretty daughter, Preet who has a soft corner for Harman. However, unaware of Preet’s feelings Harman returns to India as a rich man.

As he returns he finds out that Simran is studying at Shimla University and he joins the University to grab the golden opportunity be close to Simran. Their journey commences with friendship, togetherness and they bond in the snow-capped valleys of Simla. Harman starts seeing love in Simran’s eyes for him and he does everything in his power to make Simran happy. Valentine’s Day is when he confesses his love for Simran and he sees that Simran just considers him as a good friend and she is in love with someone else. There was not the end to the tragedies in his life, he sees that when he reaches India, he not only loses his love but also his parents and what adds to it is that his friends are somehow standing against him. Movie is all about, how a man struggles for things by working hard and when he finds himself closer to his goal, things slips from his hand which somehow justifies the title -Pata Nahi Rabb Kehdeyan Rangan Ch Raazi ...

== Music ==
Film's music was released in August 2011 but the movie's release was delayed. The music director is Jaidev Kumar and the playback singers are Jaspinder Narula, Firoz Khan, Kamal Khan, as well as Sukhbir.

== Cast ==
Actor/Actress	Role
Tarun Khanna	Harman Singh/Harman
Neeru Bajwa	Simran Kaur/Simran
Gurpreet Ghuggi	Triple role but mainly as Preetam Singh
Amar Noorie	Kiran
Rana Ranbir	Harman's friend
Sunita Dhir	Simran's mother
Sukhbir	Sukhbir (singing performance)
