= Tara (TV series) =

- Written by: Vinta Nanda; Varun Gautam.
- Directed by: Raman Kumar
- Starring: Navneet Nishan; Alok Nath
- Opening theme: "Tara" by Kuldip Singh
- Country of origin: India
- Original language: Hindi

Production
- Producer: Raman Kumar
- Running time: 23 minutes

Original release
- Network: Zee TV
- Release: 1993 – 1997

Tara is an Indian soap opera that aired on Zee TV channel, based on the trials and tribulations, the joys and sorrows of the main character, Tara. The series was known as the first ever Indian soap on contemporary urban women, and was the first Hindi-language drama series to run for about five years. Besides focusing on the life of Tara, the series also showed the lives of her four other friends, Kanchan, Devyani, Arzoo and Sheena.

== Cast ==
Actor/Actress	Character	Notes
Navneet Nishan	Choti Tara Seth / Tara Saigal,	
Amita Nangia	Sheena Pratap Singh	
Rakesh Bedi	Danny	
Alok Nath	Deepak Seth	
Grusha Kapoor	Devyani Seth	
Ratna Pathak Shah	Kanchan Soni	
Imran Khan	Popo	
Deven Bhojani	Petha	
Ram Mohan	Bade Papa, Tara's paternal grandfather	
Raja Bundela	Rohit Seth, Tara's friend	
Neha Sharad	Arzoo Rana	
Shefali Shetty	Mala	
Benjamin Gilani	Prithvi, Kanchan's husband	
Harsh Chhaya	Jijo	
Girish Malik	Rohan	
Sushmita Mukherjee Replaced Navneet Nishan	Anita Seth	
Bharat Kapoor	Ashok Sehgal, Tara's father	1993–1995
Avtar Gill	Rana, Arzoo's father	
Shiv Kumar	Veeru Sehgal Kanchan's brother	
Bhushan Jeevan		
Akshat Kapoor	Arzoo's son	

== Reception ==
According to India Today, Tara was number one in Delhi with a TRP of 14 in November 1993.
