= Ek: The Power of One =

2009 Hindi-language action thriller film

- Theatrical release poster
- Directed by: Sangeeth Sivan
- Written by: Pankaj Trivedi; Sachin Shah
- Based on: Athadu by Trivikram Srinivas
- Produced by: Jasswant Khera
- Starring: Nana Patekar; Bobby Deol; Shriya Saran
- Cinematography: Ramji
- Edited by: Chirag Jain
- Music by: Score: Sanjoy Chowdhury; Songs: Pritam Chakraborty
- Distributed by: K Sera Sera; Dharam Films
- Release date: 27 March 2009
- Running time: 146 minutes
- Country: India
- Language: Hindi
- Box office: ₹6 crore

Ek: The Power of One is a 2009 Indian Hindi-language action thriller film directed by Sangeeth Sivan, starring Nana Patekar, Bobby Deol and Shriya Saran. It is a remake of the 2005 Telugu-language film Athadu.

== Plot ==
Politician Anna Mhatre, leader of the opposition, intends to win the upcoming election by staging a failed assassination attempt on himself, which would garner him sympathy votes. To accomplish this, Mhatre, his deputy Joshi and their aide Rafiq hire Nandkumar Sharma alias Nandu, a contract killer, along with his partner Shekhar. On the day of the staged attack, Nandu's plan goes awry when Mhatre is actually shot dead. Attempting escape, Nandu sees Shekhar die in a car accident and manages to evade the police by jumping onto a moving train.

On the train, Nandu meets Puran Singh, who is returning to his hometown, Hoshiarpur, after running away as a child many years ago. While the train halts at a station, the police searching for Nandu arrive. The sub-inspector of the search party spots Nandu and fires at him, but hits Puran instead. Nandu uses the distraction to escape and goes to Hoshiarpur. However, Puran's unsuspecting family mistakes Nandu for their long-lost relative and welcomes him with open arms. Over time, he bonds with them and falls in love with Preet Kaur, Puran's childhood friend. Nandu helps the family resolve several issues, including protecting their farmland, aiding a struggling family affected by Puran's past actions, and withdrawing money from his own bank account to fund Puran's sister's wedding. He confides his real identity to Puran's friend Guru.

Meanwhile, CBI officer Nandkumar Rane is assigned to investigate Mhatre's assassination. Noting inconsistencies in the evidence, he goes to Hoshiarpur but fails to uncover Nandu's identity. All evidence points toward the deceased Shekhar, leading Rane to consult Savte, Nandu and Shekhar's former mentor in prison. After surreptitiously confirming Nandu's identity and the location of the payment for the job, Rane discovers a withdrawal from Nandu's account, calls the household, and tricks Nandu into revealing himself, causing him to flee. Arriving at the house, Rane informs Puran's family of his real fate and departs.

The revelation leaves the family devastated, but Guru defends Nandu, highlighting his contributions to the family, saying he didn't take credit for or make anyone know of his actions. After learning of the family’s reaction, Nandu returns and admits his true identity. He admits to the lie but says he never intended to deceive the family. Puran's grandfather, Kripal Singh, takes him to his study and privately acknowledges Nandu as his grandson, noting that he didn't need to do what he did but did it out of love anyway.

Nandu contacts Joshi and blackmails him with a fake recording of their original conversation. Joshi reveals that Shekhar is alive and was bribed to kill Mhatre and frame Nandu so that Joshi could secure the chief minister position. Nandu secretly records this confession.

In a confrontation, Nandu fights with Shekhar but spares him for the sake of Puran's family. Shekhar is about to kill Nandu but is shot dead by a CBI officer hired by Joshi to get the evidence and gets arrested. Nandu later hands over the recorded evidence to Rane, who uses it to confront Joshi, who arrogantly dismisses the evidence as inadmissible in court. However, Rane points out that Mhatre's vengeful son would not hesitate to kill him once the truth emerged. With no escape, Joshi commits suicide.

Later, Rane finds Nandu performing Puran's last rites. Addressing him as Puran, he reveals that he has officially cleared Nandu's name and allows him to go free. Nandu, having fully embraced his new identity, returns to Hoshiarpur to live happily with his newfound family.

== Cast ==
- Nana Patekar as CBI Inspector Nandkumar Rane
- Bobby Deol as Nandkumar Sharma "Nandu"
- Shriya Saran as Preet Kaur
- Chunky Pandey as Balli
- Jackie Shroff as Savte (Special Appearance)
- Kulbhushan Kharbanda as Kripal Singh
- Pradeep Kharab as Shekhar
- Sachin Khedekar as Opposition Minister Anna Mhatre
- Raghuveer Yadav as Minister Joshi
- Prete Bhutani as Nandini
- Zarina Wahab as Gayatri
- Gurpreet Ghuggi as Guru
- Jaspal Bhatti as Amrik Singh Nasa
- Upasana Singh as Manjeet
- Sanjay Mishra as Advocate Parminder Singh
- Rana Ranbir as Dev
- Akshay Kapoor as Puran Singh
- Ajaz Khan as Yuvaraj Mhatre
- Rana Jung Bahadur as Chaudhary
- Vikramjeet Virk (Special Appearance)
- Dhritiman Chatterjee as DIG Shergill
- Ritu Vij as Balbir
- Anant Jog as Police Inspector
- Shishir Sharma as CBI Officer
- Simran Deepali as Channo

== Soundtrack ==
Ek: The Power of One

Soundtrack album by Pritam Chakraborty
- Released: 2009
- Genre: Feature film soundtrack

Pritam Chakraborty chronology
Billu (2009)	Ek: The Power of One (2009)	Aa Dekhen Zara (2009)

All music is composed by Pritam.

No.	Title	Lyrics	Singer(s)	Length
1.	"Sambhale"	Shabbir Ahmed	Sukhwinder Singh, Sunidhi Chauhan	05:45
2.	"Sona Lagda"	Shabbir Ahmed	Shashwati Phukan	05:09
3.	"Tum Saath Ho"	Shabbir Ahmed	Shreya Ghoshal, Abhijeet	05:21
4.	"Bang Bang"	Mayur Puri	Rana Mazumder	05:40
5.	"Sona Lagda (Kilogram Mix)"	Shabbir Ahmed	Shashwati Phukan	03:54
