= Aa Gaye Munde U.K. De =

- Directed by: Manmohan Singh
- Written by: Manmohan Singh
- Produced by: Sunny Trehan
- Starring: Jimmy Sheirgill; Neeru Bajwa; Gurpreet Ghuggi; Binnu Dhillon; Khushboo Grewal; Om Puri; Gugu Gill
- Cinematography: Nazir Khan
- Edited by: Manish More
- Music by: Jatinder Shah
- Distributed by: Yash Raj Films
- Release date: 8 August 2014
- Language: Punjabi

Aa Gaye Munde U.K. De or Munde U.K. De 2 (English: Here Comes The UK Boys.) is a 2014 Indian Punjabi-language romantic comedy film directed by Manmohan Singh and produced by Sunny Trehan/Trehan Productions. The film features Jimmy Sheirgill, Neeru Bajwa, Gurpreet Ghuggi, Binnu Dhillon, Khushboo Grewal, Om Puri and Gugu Gill. Aa Gaye Munde U.K. De was released on 8 August 2014.

Aa Gaye Munde U.K. De is a standalone sequel to Munde U.K. De (2009). The trailer was launched on 10 July 2014.

== Cast ==
- Jimmy Sheirgill as Roopinder Grewal aka Roop
- Neeru Bajwa as Disha Dhillon
- Om Puri as Disha's Father - Dilip Singh Dhillon
- Khushboo Grewal as Lovely
- Binnu Dhillon as Mintoo
- Navneet Nishan as Roopinder's Mother - Mrs. Grewal
- Gugu Gill Roopinder's Father - Harjit Singh Grewal
- Gurpreet Ghuggi as Roop's Best Friend DJ - Daljeet Jugaadi
- Inana Sran as Kindar Chawla
- Rana Ranbir as Mohan Singh aka Mohnii
- Sangeeta Gupta as Mittho - Mohnii's Wife
- Satinder Sidhu as Disha's Mother - Jeet Kaur Dhillon
- Karamjeet Brar as Shera - Mohnii's Worker
- Harpal Singh Pali as Kindar's Father - Prof. Chawla
- Gurleen Chopra as Dolly (cameo)

== Soundtrack ==
Aa Gaye Munde U.K. De

Soundtrack album by Jatinder Shah
- Released: 18 July 2014
- Genre: Feature film soundtrack
- Length: 18:45
- Label: Zee Music Company
- Producer: Sunny Trehan

The soundtrack of Aa Gaye Munde U.K. De was composed by Jatinder Shah while the lyrics were written by Kumaar and Veet Baljit.

No.	Title	Lyrics	Music	Singer(s)	Length
1.	"Aa Gaye Munde U.K. De"	Veet Baljit	Jatinder Shah	Nishawan Bhullar Khushboo Grewal	2:26
2.	"Chori Chori"	Kumaar	Jatinder Shah	Kamal Khan	3:26
3.	"Pasand Apni"	Veet Baljit	Jatinder Shah	Roshan Prince Gurlez Akhtar	4:50
4.	"Tere Fasle"	Kumaar	Jatinder Shah	Mohit Chauhan Sunidhi Chauhan	5:22
5.	"Tere Hi Naal"	Kumaar	Jatinder Shah	Kamal Khan	3:21
Total length:					18:45

== Awards and nominations ==
Recipient(s) and nominee(s)	Award Ceremony	Category	Result
Manish More	PTC Punjabi Film Awards	Best Editing	Nominated
Nazir Khan	PTC Punjabi Film Awards	Best Cinematography	Nominated
Rana Ranbir	PTC Punjabi Film Awards	Best Dialogues	Nominated
Gurpreet Ghuggi	PTC Punjabi Film Awards	Best Supporting Actor	Nominated
Neeru Bajwa	PTC Punjabi Film Awards	Best Actress	Nominated
Jimmy Sheirgill	PTC Punjabi Film Awards	Best Actor	Nominated
