= Parvaaz: The Journey =

- Official film poster
- Directed by: Gurbir Singh Grewal
- Written by: Barney Thomson
- Produced by: Barney Thomson Dave Sidhu Navjot Barney Anbhole
- Starring: Gulshan Grover; Kimi Verma; Mandeep Brar
- Cinematography: Andy Hodgson
- Production companies: Barney Films & Media Arts Inc
- Distributed by: Navroz Gurbaz Entertainment
- Release date: 23 July 2021 (Canada)
- Country: India
- Languages: Hindi; English; Punjabi

Parvaaz: The Journey is a 2021 Indian multilingual drama film directed by Gurbir Singh Grewal, starring Gulshan Grover Kimi Verma, Mandeep Brar, Zoe Fraser, Garry Sanghera and Kirti Arneja in lead roles. The film is based on the father-son relationship and their differences. Grover played the role of a single father.

== Cast ==
- Gulshan Grover
- Kimi Verma
- Mandeep Brar
- Zoe Fraser
- Garry Sanghera
- Kirti Arneja

== Production ==
The film was shot at some of the locations of Osoyoos & Oliver.
