= Nasibo =

- Directed by: Manmohan Singh
- Produced by: Mrs. Manjit Kaur Gill; Rakesh Kumar
- Starring: Raj Babbar; Kimi Verma; Amitoj Maan; Preeti Sapru; Mehar Mittal; Girja Shanker
- Cinematography: Manmohan Singh
- Edited by: Subhash Sehgal
- Music by: Uttam-Jagdish
- Release date: 1994
- Country: India
- Language: Punjabi

Nasibo (also spelled as Naseebo) is a 1994 Indian Punjabi-language film, directed by Manmohan Singh, starring Raj Babbar, Kavita Kamal (Kimi Verma), Preeti Sapru, Amitoj Maan and others. Gurdas Maan gave a special appearance.

== Plot ==
Nasibo lives with her brother (Naajar Singh), her widowed mother (Santi), and her sister-in-law (Veero). Gurmeet Singh is a family friend and is secretly in love with Nasibo.

Santi had once been engaged to marry Diala Singh of Danpur; but Santi broke the rishta upon discovering that Diala Singh's younger brother had brought shame upon the family by eloping with a girl. In parting, Santi referred to Diala Singh and his family as "kanjar" (an individual or family supported by the earnings of a prostitute), which Diala Singh carried as an unforgivable insult and vowed to avenge his honour. Santi married Bhan Singh: the father of Nasibo and Naajar. However, Diala Singh took advantage of a mela crowd and killed him in revenge, for which he was jailed.

Years later, Diala Singh is released from jail and hatches a plan with his son, Seeta, to avenge his insult by way of deceiving Nasibo into marrying Seeta and then dishonouring her. The first step is to go to Naajar's home with an audience of villagers and publicly apologise to Santi for her husband's murder, which he describes as accidental. Santi accepts the apology in the hope of putting an end to the blood feud and protecting Naajar – but Naajar is unable to come to terms with his mother's acceptance of Diala's apology.

The next step of Diala's plan sees Seeta seducing Nasibo with the help of Seeta's real lover, Swarno, who befriends Nasibo and has her ear at all times. After rumours of their relationship spreads through the village, Naajar swiftly marries Nasibo to another man to avoid dishonour. Diala counters this by causing Nasibo to elope with Seeta on the night before her wedding to Mumbai, thus dishonouring her family. Naajar, having been hospitalised by a sneak attack of Diala Singh's, is unaware of all this. He is also unaware of the family's attempts to avert dishonour by secretly marrying Veero's younger sister to Nasibo's groom in Nasibo's stead. When Naajar eventually discovers what has happened, he storms over to Diala's home and kills him, rendering himself an outlaw. He then sets off to Mumbai to find Nasibo and kill her in order to restore their family's honour.

While in Mumbai, Nasibo discovers a letter from Swarno intended for Seeta, and thus discovers the entire conspiracy. Seeta then chases her into the city, where a cab driver intervenes long enough for Nasibo to escape – but she ends up lost in the city without money for food or shelter.

Naajar and Gurmeet arrive in Mumbai and enlist the aid of the cab driver who bumped into Nasibo. They eventually find her, and Naajar tries to kill her, but Gurmeet stops him by offering to marry Nasibo and save her honour. Naajar happily agrees to the arrangement just before Seeta attempts to run them over with a truck. Naajar is mortally wounded, but survives long enough to help Gurmeet kill Seeta and forgive Nasibo.

Gurmeet is arrested, so the cab driver takes Nasibo back to her village, where he informs Santi and Veero of Naajar's death, and hands over his ashes. Both mother and wife are in mourning, and, upon holding her son's ashes, Santi collapses and dies. Unable to cope, Nasibo runs out of the house and commits suicide by jumping down a well.

A distraught Gurmeet eventually returns to the village, and Veero shows him Nasibo's tomb, which is located just outside the village, and explains that it was made upon the insistence of students who have read Nasibo's story in newspapers. Veero then leaves Gurmeet with Nasibo's tomb, at which point he looks up to see a vision of her dancing joyously. He smiles and joins her.

== Cast ==
Actor/Actress	Role
Raj Babbar	Naajar Singh
Kimi Verma	Nasibo
Amitoj Maan	Gurmeet Singh
Preeti Sapru	Veero
Sardar Sohi	Seeta
Arun Bali	Diala Singh
?	Santi
Mehar Mittal	Patanga
