= Jaspinder Cheema =

Indian actress and model

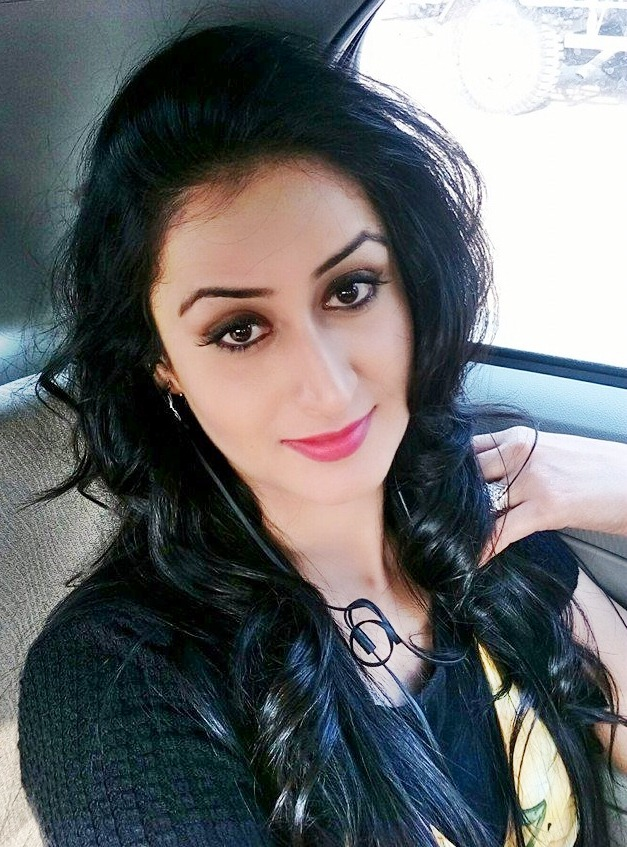
- Born: Batala, Punjab, India
- Years active: 2008–present
- Spouse: Gurjit Sing (m. 2016)

Jaspinder Cheema is an Indian model and actress in Punjabi and Hindi cinema. She was the winner of Miss PTC Punjabi 2008. She married PTC anchor, Gurjit Singh, on February 19, 2016. She studied theatre at Punjab University Chandigarh.

== Filmography ==
Year	Film	Role	Notes
2016	Gelo	Gelo	Punjabi feature film
2015	Saavi	Saavi	Hindi feature film
2014	Dhee Punjab Di	-	Punjabi feature film
2014	Kambdi Deorri	Pali	Punjabi short film
2014	Veeran Naal Sardari	-	Punjabi feature film
2013	Don't Worry Yaara	Pammi	Punjabi feature film
2010	Ik Kudi Punjab Di	Navdeep Sidhu	Punjabi feature film

== Music videos ==
Year	Song	Singer	Movie
2015	"Vyah Oh De Naal"	Preet Harpal	Myself Pendu

== Awards and nominations ==
Year	Award Ceremony	Result
2008	Miss PTC Punjabi	Won
