= Amar Noorie =

Indian Singer and Actress

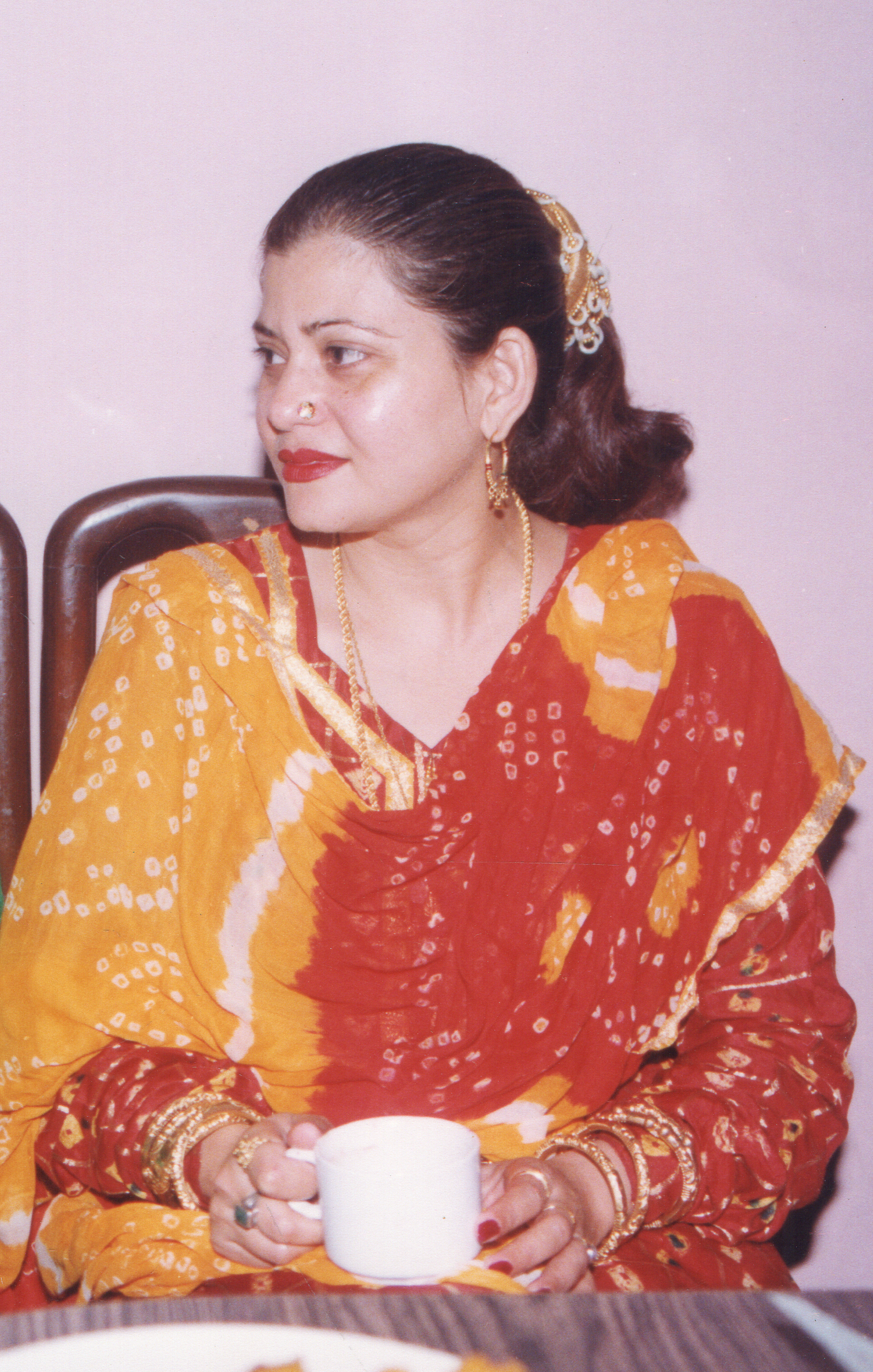
- Noorie in 1998
- Born: 23 May 1967 (age 59); Rangeelpur, Ropar District, Punjab
- Other name: Amar Noori
- Spouse: Sardool Sikander (m. 1993)

Amar Noorie (also spelled as Amar Noori) is an Indian singer and actress, who works in Punjabi-language films.

== Early life and career ==
Amar Noorie was born on 23 May 1967 in village Rangeelpur, Ropar District in Punjab. She was married to Sardool Sikander on 30 January 1993.

Noorie started professional singing at an early age when she was only 9 years old. She started singing with Punjabi singer Didar Sandhu in 1981, and made her first recording when she was only 13. In 1986, she met Sardool Sikander and they started singing together and later married.

Noories' first acting break came in 1988 in a landmark TV series "Eho Hamara Jeevna", directed by Gurbir Singh Grewal (based on a novel of Dalip Kaur Tiwana). She also acted in famous telefilms Dukh Nivaran and Murkia.

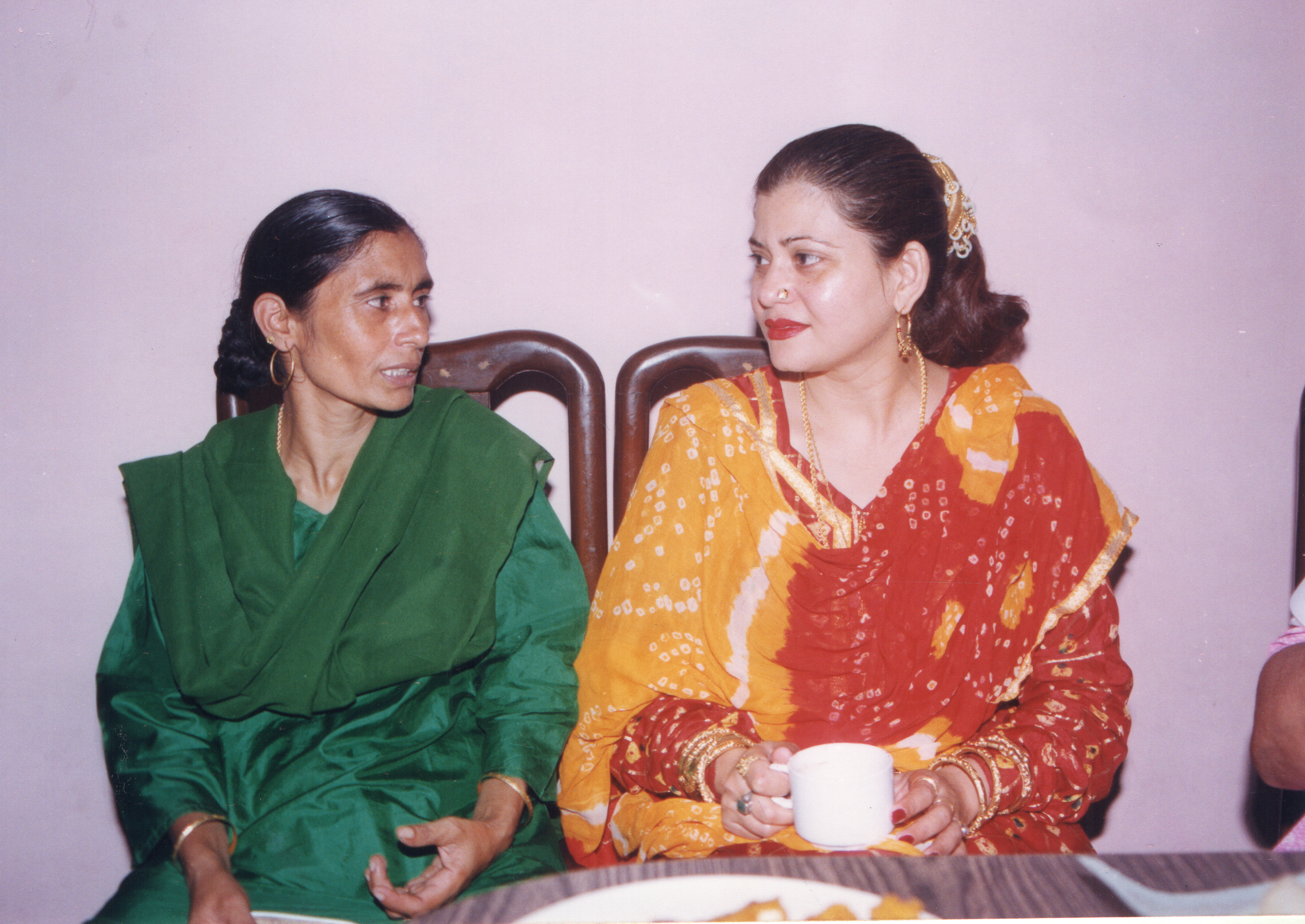
In 1998

== Filmography ==
Noorie acted in many Punjabi films and also worked as a playback singer for many of them.

- Gabhroo Punjab Da (1986) ... Live performance
- Jatt Punjab Da (1990)
- Vaisakhi (1991)
- Udeekan Sain Diyaan (1991)
- Badla Jatti Da (1991) ... Noorie
- Jorr Jatt Da (1991)
- Dil Da Maamla (1992)
- Putt Sardaran De (1992)
- Zakhmi Sher (1996)
- Panchayat (1996)
- Mela (1997)
- Jang Da Maidan (1997)
- Jee Aayan Nu (2003)
- Dil Apna Punjabi (2006)
- Mel Karade Rabba (2010)
- Tere Ishq Nachaya (2010)
- Pata Nahi Rabb Kehdeyan Rangan Ch Raazi (2012)
- Daddy Cool Munde Fool (2013)
- Shahid-e-mohabbat Punjabi film (2005)
- ALBUMS
- Yaari Pardesian Di (1989)
- Jija ve teri Sali Nachdi (1988)
- Nau Sas Da Mukabla (1988)
- Gora Rang Deyi Na Rabba (1989)
- Navi Vyahi Nachi (1988)
- Dudh pee la Balma (1988)
- Sad Gayian Gavandana (1989)
- Reela Di Dukaan (1989)
- Nachna Sakht Mana Hai (1989)
- Gidha Junction (1990)
- Bhangra Beats (1991)
- Mela Meliyan Da (1997)
- Mela Baisakhi Da (1998)
- Hello Hello 2000 (2000)
- Kala Doriya 99 (1999)
- Husan Punjaban Da (1997)
- Kalli Beh Ke Sochi (1997)
- Ik Main Hova Ik Tu Hoven (2009)
- Addi Tappa (1996)
- Chori Teri Fadi gayi (1996)
- Nakhra 96 (1996)
- Mittra Nu Maar geya (1996)
- Na maat zalma ve (1986)
- Fatak Kotkapure Da (1985)
- Jhanjar Di Chhankar (1999)
- Gali Gali Chhankata (2001)
- Phulkari (2000)
- Bhangra 2000 (2000)
- Lara Lappa (1992)
- Panth Khalsa (1998)
- Sanu vi chithiya payi datiye (1992)
