= Manmohan Singh (director) =

Indian film director and cinematographer

- Occupations: Film director; cinematographer
- Years active: 1970s–present
- Notable work: Dilwale Dulhania Le Jayenge, Jee Aayan Nu

Manmohan Singh is an Indian film director and cinematographer. He is the director of Punjabi films and the cinematographer of Hindi films. As a cinematographer, he had frequently collaborated with Yash Chopra and his son Aditya Chopra, for whom he shot Chandni (1989), Lamhe (1991), Darr (1993), Dilwale Dulhania Le Jayenge (1995), Dil To Pagal Hai (1997), and Mohabbatein (2000). Besides his career as a cinematographer, he is also known as a pioneering director in Punjabi cinema. He directed his first Hindi film, Pehla Pehla Pyar in 1994 and his first Punjabi film Jee Ayan Nu in 2003. He received the "Lifetime Achievement Award" at the PTC Punjabi Film Awards 2019.

== Early life and career ==
Singh's first big project was the debut film for Sunny Deol's Betaab. After that, he worked on films like Lekin, Lamhe, Chaalbaaz in the early 1990s. He won two Filmfare Awards for Yash Chopra's Darr and Chandni. Manmohan Singh also sang for many Bollywood film songs like "Mere Pyar Ki Umar" from Waaris (1988) with Lata Mangeshkar, "Jeene De Yeh Duniya Chaahe Maar Daale" from Laava (1985) with Asha Bhonsle and "Marne Se Na Yun Darna" from Laila (1984) with Lata.

In the 2000s, Manmohan Singh started directing Punjabi films. His first Punjabi film was Jee Aayan Nu in 2003, and he consequently made films like Dil Apna Punjabi, Mera Pind and Munde U.K. De.

== Filmography ==
=== Directed ===
- Nasibo (1993)
- Jee Aayan Nu (2002)
- Asa Nu Maan Watna Da (2004)
- Yaaran Naal Baharan (2005)
- Dil Apna Punjabi (2006)
- Mitti Wajaan Maardi (2007)
- Mera Pind (2008)
- Munde U.K. De (2009)
- Ik Kudi Punjab Di (2010)
- Ajj De Ranjhe (2012)
- Aa Gaye Munde U.K. De (2014)
- PR (2022)

=== Production ===
- Mera Pind (2008)
- Ik Kudi Punjab Di (2010)
- Honour Killing (2014)
- Hate Story 2 (2014)

=== Cinematography ===
- Chann Pardesi (Punjabi) (1981)
- Betaab (1983)
- Preeti (Punjabi) (1986)
- Ucha Dar Babe Nanak Da (Punjabi) (1987)
- Vijay (1988)
- Waaris (1988)
- Souten Ki Beti (1989)
- Chandni (1989)
- Chaalbaaz (1989)
- Jeene Do (1990)
- Lekin... (1990)
- Sanam Bewafa (1991)
- Lamhe (1991)
- Insaaf Ki Devi (1992)
- Yaad Rakhegi Duniya (1992)
- Apradhi (1992)
- Parampara (1993)
- Darr (1993)
- Nasibo (1994)
- Dushmani: A Violent Love Story (1995)
- Dilwale Dulhania Le Jayenge (1995)
- Maachis (1996)
- Aur Pyaar Ho Gaya (1997)
- Dil To Pagal Hai (1997)
- Jab Pyaar Kisise Hota Hai (1998)
- Hu Tu Tu (1999)
- Mohabbatein (2000)
- Albela (2001)
- Filhaal... (2002)
- Kash Aap Hamare Hote (2003)
- Woh Tera Naam Tha (2004)
- Sarhad Paar (2006)
- Ik Kudi Punjab Di (2010)

== Awards ==
- Filmfare Award for Best Cinematography:
  - 1990: Chandni
  - 1994: Darr
- 1998: Zee Cine Award for Best Cinematography – Dil To Pagal Hai
- 2001: Sansui Viewers Choice Award for Best Cinematography – Mohabbatein
