= Waaris (1988 film) =

- Promotional Poster
- Directed by: Ravindra Peepat
- Screenplay by: Baldev Gill
- Based on: Kaare — Hatthi by Sohan Singh Hans
- Produced by: Swarn Yograj; J. S. Cheema; Baldev Gill
- Starring: Smita Patil; Raj Babbar; Raj Kiran; Amrita Singh; Kulbhushan Kharbanda; Amrish Puri
- Cinematography: Manmohan Singh
- Edited by: Subhash Sehgal
- Music by: Uttam-Jagdish
- Release date: 6 May 1988
- Country: India
- Language: Hindi

Waaris (transl. Heir) is a 1988 Indian Hindi-language film directed by Ravindra Peepat. The film stars Smita Patil, Raj Babbar, Raj Kiran and Amrita Singh in the lead roles. The film was adapted from the Punjabi novel Kaare — Hatthi by Sohan Singh Hans (as credited in the film). Rekha dubbed the lines for Smita Patil who died before the film's release. Patil posthumously won the Best Actress trophy at the 2nd Star & Style-Lux Awards.

== Plot ==
Multi-millionaire widower Kishan Singh prepares a will which states that his ancestral property is equally divided among his two sons, Gajjan and Dulla, while Shravan, the son of Gajjan, is to inherit the farm land. Enraged at not willing anything to his three sons, Thade, Dara and Chhote, Dulla confronts his father, the ensuing argument ending with Dulla murdering Kishan. Dulla is apprehended by the police and is jailed, leaving his sons to be raised by Gajjan.

Years later Shravan meets with a poor young woman, Paramjit, known as Paro, and both fall in love leading to marriage. During the wedding, Dulla is released from jail and he joins the family once again. Still enraged at what he and his sons were willed by his father and angered by Gajjan's coldness towards him, Dulla quickly influences his sons and schemes with them to claim what they believe is rightfully theirs by any means. Finding a jealous admirer of Paro, Dulla consipires with him to have Shravan killed while he is visiting a poor village as part of his post-wedding commitments. Posing as a poor villager, the ex-admirer stabs Shravan and kills him before running off into the darkness, only for Dulla's sons, Thade and Dara, to burn him alive thus preventing anyone linking them to Shravan's murder.

Paro is distraught at Shravan's death and is horrified when Dulla approaches Gajjan to arrange Paro's marriage with his mentally challenged son, Chhote, to ensure his own progeny inherits Shravan's farm land, which now belongs to Paro. The proposal is angrily rejected and Paro realises that until a new heir is produced, Dulla and his sons will stop at nothing to claim the land. Determined to not let this happen but unwilling to marry another man, Paro argues for Gajjan to remarry so a new heir can inherit the land. Gajjan is reluctant to get married again at his age but Paro convinces him, putting forward her own younger sister Shibo as his new wife. However, this is complicated by the fact that Shibo is love with Binder and wants to marry only him. Much to the heartbreak of Binder, Shibo's devotion to Paro persuades her to sacrifices her love to help her sister and she marries Gajjan, eventually giving birth to his son and a new heir, much to the delight of Paro who treats the child like her own, knowing Shravan's land is now secure and away from the hands of Dulla and his sons.

Unwilling to accept defeat and obsessed with claiming the land, Dulla and his sons plan to eliminate all obstacles in their path. They ambush Gajjan with goons and mercilessly kill him before attacking the house, seeking to murder Gajjan and Shibo's new son. Paro holds off the attackers and asks Shibo to save the baby. Shibo sets off for the farm land and meets Binder, begging him to help save her son. With the help of villagers, Shibo and Binder fight off Dulla and his goons while protecting the baby. Chhote is accidentally electrocuted after trying to snatch the baby from Shibo while Thade is ambushed by villagers and stabbed to death with a pitchfork. Witnessing two of his sons die in a matter of moments, a deranged Dulla shoots at Binder and a group of villagers who are beating up Dara, only for Dara to take the brunt of Dulla's bullets and die. With his own heirs now dead, Dulla madly approaches the baby with a sword, proclaiming to make the land that his own sons could not inherit heirless. As he draws closer, Paro intervenes, sacrificing herself in killing Dulla and saving the baby. As she dies, she asks forgiveness from Shibo and Binder, happily leaving them to take care of the baby and her husband's ancestral land.

== Cast ==
- Smita Patil as Paramjit "Paro" Singh (Voice dubbed by Rekha)
- Raj Babbar as Binder
- Raj Kiran as Sharvan Singh
- Amrita Singh as Sibo Singh
- Kulbhushan Kharbanda as Gajjan Singh
- Amrish Puri as Dulla Singh
- Pradeep Kumar as Kishan Singh
- Sushma Seth as Paro's Mother
- Navneet Nishan as Channo
- Javed Khan as Chhote
- Avtar Gill as Dara
- Sudhir Pandey as Thanna "Thade" Singh
- Ramesh Tiwari as Thekedar
- Amrit Pal as Sarpanch Gursharan Singh
- Anjana Mumtaz as Sibo's Real Mother
- Deep Dhillon as Police Inspector
- Sardar Sohi as Constable Hridaymal Murarilal

== Soundtrack ==
Music by Uttam Singh and Jagdish Sodhi and lyrics by Verma Malik.

Song	Singer
"Khud Ko Samajh Na Akeli"	Kishore Kumar
"Husn Ki Wadiyon Mein Ishq Palta Rahega"	Kishore Kumar, Lata Mangeshkar
"Duniya Tu Yaad Rakhna"	Mahendra Kapoor
"Duniya Tu Yaad Rakhna" (Sad)	Mahendra Kapoor
"Mere Pyar Ki Umar Ho Itni Sanam"	Lata Mangeshkar, Manmohan Singh
"Ghata Chha Gayi Hai, Bahar Aa Gayi Hai"	Lata Mangeshkar, Suresh Wadkar
"Ghunghat Utha Ke Na Dekh"	Lata Mangeshkar
"Jholi Mein Heere Ho Tere"	Lata Mangeshkar
"Aare Munjhe, Taare Munjhe"	Asha Bhosle
