= Rana Ranbir =

Indian Punjabi actor

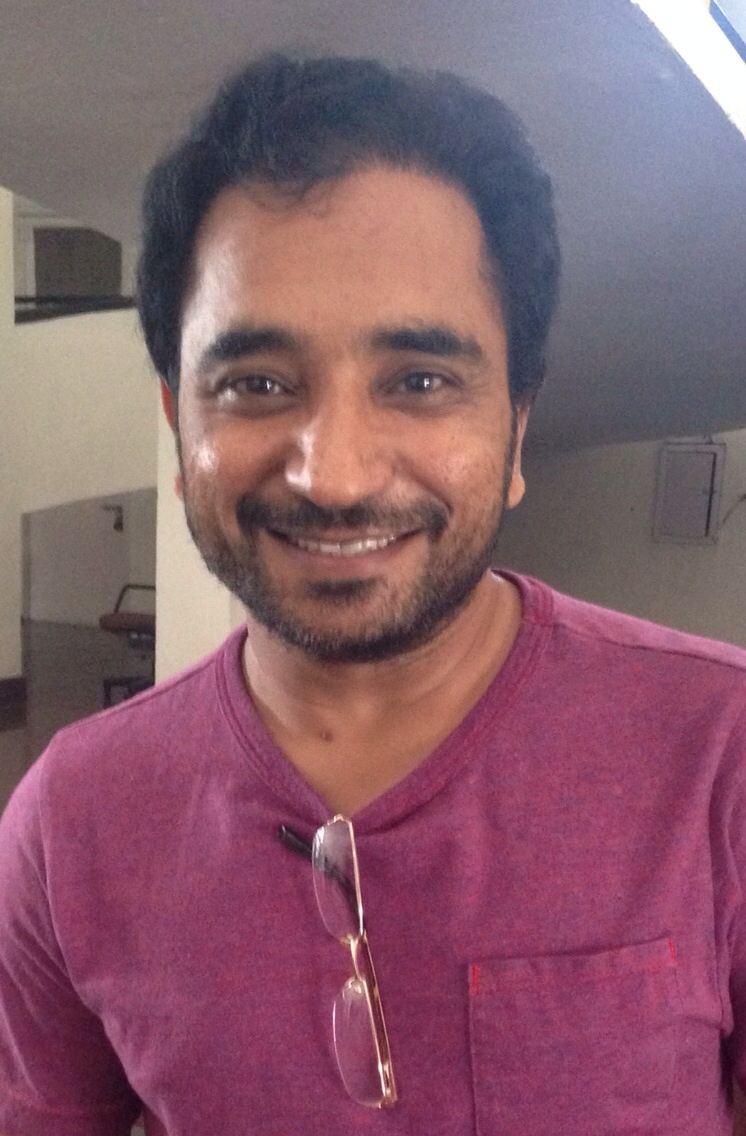
- Born: Rana Ranbir Singh; April 9, 1970 (age 56); Dhuri, Sangrur district, Punjab, India
- Education: Punjabi University
- Occupations: Actor, comedian; radio personality; television presenter; writer; director
- Years active: 2000–Present

Rana Ranbir Singh (born 9 April 1970) is an Indian Punjabi actor working in Punjabi cinema and Hindi cinema.

== Early life and education ==
Rana Ranbir was born on 9 April 1970 in Dhuri, Sangrur district, Punjab in India.

After completing a bachelor's degree from Desh Bhagat College Dhuri, he received a postgraduate degree in theater and television from Punjabi University, Patiala. Punjabi comedian Binnu Dhillon was his classmate in both college and university.

== Career ==
In 2000s, he started with comedies on Television with Bhagwant Mann like Jugnu Mast Mast and Naughty No. 1 alongside serious TV productions like Chitta Lahoo and Parchavain. He also became anchor of Zee Punjabi’s road show Excuse Me Please. He did many stage theatre plays like Khetan Da Putt.

== Filmography ==
Year	Movie	Role	Notes
2005	Jija Ji	Daler Singh	Punjabi
2006	Rabb Ne Banaiyan Jodiean		Punjabi
2006	Dil Apna Punjabi	Lakkad Chab	Punjabi
2006	Mehndi Wale Hath	Master Tara Singh	Punjabi
2007	Mitti Wajaan Maardi	Pateliya	Punjabi
2008	Mera Pind	Ruldu 'Phd'	Punjabi
2008	Hashar: A Love Story...	Jolly	Punjabi
2009	Ek: The Power of One	Dev	Hindi
2009	Tera Mera Ki Rishta		Punjabi
2009	Munde U.K. De	Khojji	Punjabi
2009	Lagda Ishq Hogaya	Janky Jatt	Punjabi
2009	Akhiyaan Udeekdian	Ranjha	Punjabi
2010	Panjaban – Love Rules Hearts	Golu	Punjabi
2010	Kabaddi Ikk Mohabbat	Tinu Kohli	Punjabi
2010	Chhevan Dariya (The Sixth River)		Punjabi
2010	Chak Jawaana	Master	Punjabi
2010	Channa Sachi Muchi		Punjabi
2010	Ik Kudi Punjab Di	Deeva	Punjabi
2011	Ek Noor		Punjabi
2012	Pata Nahi Rabb Kehdeyan Rangan Ch Raazi	Sikander	Punjabi
2012	Kabaddi Once Again	Nikka Singh Lamteengh	Punjabi
2012	Taur Mittran Di	Captain	Punjabi
2012	Jatt & Juliet	Shampy Singh Chawla	Punjabi
2012	Carry On Jatta	Chota Bhullar / Aarhu	Punjabi
2012	Ajj De Ranjhe	Munshi Ram	Punjabi
2012	Saadi Wakhri Hai Shaan		Punjabi
2012	Yamley Jatt Yamley		Punjabi
2013	Bikkar Bai Sentimental		Punjabi
2013	Rangeelay	Shotgun	Punjabi
2013	Jatt & Juliet 2	Shampy Singh Chawla	Punjabi
2013	Daddy Cool Munde Fool	Manjit Singh	Punjabi
2013	Fer Mamla Gadbad Gadbad	Rambo	Punjabi
2013	Oye Hoye Pyar Ho Gaya	Harry	Punjabi
2013	Ronde Sare Vyah Picho	Mr. Goldie	Punjabi
2013	Nabar: A Rebel with a Cause		Punjabi
2013	Dil Sada Luteya Gaya		Punjabi
2013	Yaar Mera Rab Warga	Sona Gill	Punjabi
2014	Yaaran Da Katchup	Gabbar	Punjabi
2014	Romeo Ranjha		Punjabi
2014	Aa Gaye Munde U.K. De	Mohnii	Punjabi
2014	Disco Singh		Punjabi
2014	Goreyan Nu Daffa Karo	Kala's brother in law	Punjabi
2014	Punjab 1984	Jagtar Singh Taari	Punjabi
2014	Goreyan Nu Daffa Karo	Uday Pratap Singh	Punjabi
2015	Oh Yaara Ainvayi Ainvayi Lut Gaya	Ishwar Singh lawyer	Punjabi
2016	Ardaas	Lottery	Punjabi
2016	Love Punjab	Balwan Singh (special appearance)	Punjabi
2016	Vaisakhi List	Bheem Chand	Punjabi
2016	Channo Kamli Yaar Di	Taaji's friend	Punjabi
2016	Kuknoos	Multani	Punjabi
2016	Ambarsariya	Manpreet Bhangra Coach	Punjabi
2016	Kinna Karde Ha Pyar	Jugnu	Punjabi
2016	Darra		Punjabi
2017	Manje Bistre	Seeta	Punjabi
2017	Super Singh		Punjabi
2017	Jab Harry Met Sejal	Harry's Friend	Hindi Film
2017	Saab Bahadar	Kabul Singh	Punjabi
2017	Nikka Zaildar 2	Mr. Boota	Punjabi
2017	The journey of Panjab 2016		Punjabi
2018	Asees	Asees Singh	Punjabi
2018	Banjara		Punjabi
2019	Paani Ch Madhaani		Punjabi
2019	Do Dooni Panj	Magistrate	Punjabi
2019	Kesari		Hindi Film
2019	Ardaas Karaan		Punjabi
2019	Daaka	Balli	Punjabi
2019	Kitty Party		Punjabi
2021	Shava Ni Girdhari Lal		Punjabi
2021	Maa		Punjabi
2022	Snowman		Punjabi
2022	Posti		Punjabi
2024	Mehkma Chhadeyan Da		Punjabi

=== Notable roles ===
Year	Film	Role	Notes
2009	Munde U.K. De	Khojji	
2012	Jatt & Juliet	Shampy Singh Chawla	
2013	Jatt & Juliet 2	Shampy Singh Chawla	
2013	Fer Mamla Gadbad Gadbad	Rambo	
2014	Punjab 1984	Jagtar Singh Taari	
2015	Oh Yaara Ainvayi Ainvayi Lut Gaya	Ishwar Singh lawyer	
2016	Channo Kamli Yaar Di	Taaji's friend	Released
2016	Ardaas	Lottery	Released
2016	Ambarsariya	Manpreet Bhangra Coach	
2018	Asees	Asees	
