= Pehla Pehla Pyar =

1994 film by Manmohan Singh

- Directed by: Manmohan Singh
- Written by: Honey Irani; Rumi Jaffery
- Based on: Roman Holiday by Dalton Trumbo
- Produced by: B. S. Shaad
- Starring: Rishi Kapoor; Tabu
- Cinematography: Manmohan Singh
- Edited by: Subhash Sehgal
- Music by: Anand–Milind
- Production company: Brar Productions
- Release date: 6 May 1994
- Country: India
- Language: Hindi

Pehla Pehla Pyar (transl. first love) is a 1994 Indian Hindi-language romantic film directed by Manmohan Singh. It stars Rishi Kapoor and Tabu. The movie is loosely inspired by the American movie Roman Holiday.

== Summary ==
Sapna runs away from her aristocratic home, fed up with the hatred and family politics. She meets with Raj, who she is attracted to. Raj, at first wants to get rid of her, then eventually falls in love with her. Then the two of them have to be on the run as her family finds out where she is after they put up a reward for her whereabouts.

== Cast ==
- Rishi Kapoor as Raj Manohar Singh
- Tabu as Sapna
- Anupam Kher as Anand
- Kader Khan as Dharam Pal/Truck driver/grocer/Nawabsaab, Train Passenger/ Street side vendor stall owner.
- Gulshan Grover as Shakti Singh
- Amrish Puri as Hukum Singh
- Radha Seth as Rani Maa
- Tiku Talsania as Anand's Boss
- Dinesh Hingoo as Cook at street side vendor
- Brahmachari (actor) as Servant at grocery store.
- Gopi Bhalla

== Soundtrack ==
The music was scored by Anand–Milind, while the lyrics were authored by veteran lyricist Anand Bakshi. The music was released on CDs and tapes by Venus Records & Tapes c/o Ganesh Jain.

#	Title	Singer(s)
1	"Kore Kaagaz Pe Likhwale"	Suresh Wadkar, Alka Yagnik
2	"O Jaanu"	Poornima (singer), Udit Narayan
3	"Thandi Hawa Sun"	Alka Yagnik
4	"Saawan Mahina"	Poornima, Udit Narayan
5	"Saari Baatein Hoti Hain By Chance"	Poornima, Kumar Sanu
6	"Mujhe Pyar Karegi"	Alka Yagnik, Udit Narayan
7	"Maine Kahi Na"	Alka Yagnik, Kumar Sanu
