= Dil Apna Punjabi =

- Directed by: Manmohan Singh
- Written by: Manmohan Singh
- Produced by: Kumar S. Taurani; Ramesh S. Taurani
- Starring: Harbhajan Mann; Neeru Bajwa; Mahek Chahal; Kanwaljit Singh
- Music by: Sukshinder Shinda
- Production company: Tips Industries
- Distributed by: Tips Industries
- Release date: 3 September 2006
- Country: India
- Language: Punjabi

Dil Apna Punjabi (Punjabi pronunciation: ['dɪl 'aːpɳaː pʌnˈdʒɑːbi]; transl. Our Heart is Punjabi) is a Punjabi feature film released on 3 September 2006. It stars Harbhajan Mann, Neeru Bajwa and Dara Singh. The film was produced by Kumar S. Taurani and Ramesh S. Taurani, written and directed by Manmohan Singh.

== Synopsis ==
Set in the lively village of modern-day Punjab, Dil Apna Punjabi is about a family spanning over four generations all living under one roof headed by Sardar Hardam Singh.

His grandson, Kanwal, is a man of his heart, who spends most of his time with his friends; a village musical troupe. When Kanwal when meets college friend Ladi at relative Faujan's home he falls in love. Faujan makes their love match seem as an arranged marriage to their respective families. However, Ladi's family meet him, they are discouraged due to his unambitious approach and his lack of employment.

When a talent scout hears him singing, Kanwal decides to make a success of himself in the UK to prove himself. Here he meets TV host Lisa. Lisa is drawn towards Kanwal's charm and simplicity soon begins to have feelings for Kanwal.

Kanwal has to choose between fame and fortune with Lisa in the UK, or returning to his roots in the Punjab to be with his first love Ladi.

== Cast ==
- Harbhajan Mann as Kanwal
- Neeru Bajwa as Ladi
- Mahek Chahal as Lisa
- Gurpreet Ghuggi as Mundi Singh
- Dara Singh as S. Hardam Singh
- Kanwaljit Singh as Kang Singh
- Deep Dhillon as Gurtej Singh (Sarpanchi)
- Satwant Kaur
- Amar Noorie as Amro
- Rana Ranbir as Lakkad Chab
- Apache Indian as Himself (Special appearance)
- Dev Kharoud

== Music ==
The music is by Sukhshinder Shinda and a blend of bhangra and Punjabi hip hop, and also includes Apache Indian. The songs of the film are sung by Harbhajan Mann, Alka Yagnik and Sunidhi Chauhan.
