= Deep Dhillon =

Indian film actor

- Born: Deep Dhillon
- Occupation: Actor
- Years active: 1987–2014
- Known for: Ek Hazaaron Mein Meri Behna Hai
- Spouse: Radha Dhillon
- Children: Karan Dhillon; Kanwar Dhillon

Deep Dhillon is an Indian actor in Punjabi cinema and Hindi films and television series. He played the role of Jayadrath in the Indian TV serial Mahabharat, appeared as Dasharatha in the TV serial Jai Hanuman, and as Sahasrarjuna in the TV serial Vishnu Puran. He is known for playing Inspector Sharma in Ghayal, and as the notorious truck driver in Maine Pyaar Kiya. He is also known for playing Dadaji in Star Plus’s hit serial Ek Hazaaron Mein Meri Behna Hai.

== Early life and career ==
Deep was born in a Jat Sikh family. He originally hails from the town of Patti in the Tarn Taran District of Punjab. His son Kanwar Dhillon is also a television actor, based in Mumbai.

== Filmography ==
=== Films ===
- 1985 Aaj Ka Daur
- 1985 Karishma Kudrat Kaa as Dacait Shera
- 1987 Mirch Masala as Soldier/Guard of Subhedar
- 1987 Hukumat
- 1987 Mr. India as Garga (Goon & Casino Club Owner)
- 1987 Mard Ki Zabaan as Local Goon
- 1988 Jatt Soormay
- 1988 Shukriyaa as Guru, College Student
- 1988 Waaris
- 1988 Bloodstone
- 1989 Mahaadev as Heera Goon
- 1989 Vardi
- 1989 Joshilaay
- 1989 Ladaai as Robert
- 1989 Maine Pyar Kiya as Lal Miyaan
- 1990 Qurbani Jatt Di
- 1990 Ghayal as Corrupt Police Officer Pritam Sharma
- 1991 Taakre Jattan De as Shamsher Singh Punjabi
- 1991 Vaisakhi
- 1991 Patthar Ke Phool as Ram Singh Gupti
- 1992 Saali Aadhi Gharwali
- 1992 Jatt Punjab Da
- 1992 Kal Ki Aawaz
- 1992 Yalgaar as Jagtiani
- 1992 Jatt Punjab Daa
- 1992 Humshakal as Police Inspector Chaudhary
- 1993 Aaj Kie Aurat as Mangal Singh / Daku Bhairav Singh
- 1993 Krishan Avtaar as Pasha
- 1993 Anmol as Pasha Henchman
- 1993 Pehchaan as Police Inspector
- 1993 Shatranj as William
- 1994 Pathreela Raasta as Jagraal
- 1994 Cheetah as Police Inspector Gupta
- 1994 Chauraha as Girdhari
- 1995 Taaqat as Irfan
- 1995 Rani Hindustani
- 1995 Karmon Kee Sazaa as Chaudhary Goon
- 1995 Faisala Main Karungi
- 1996 Vijeta as Satyamurti
- 1996 Vishwasghaat as Police Inspector Inamdar
- 1996 Loafer as Tatya
- 1996 Krishna as Sharpshooter / Hitman Who killed the Minister
- 1996 Ghatak: Lethal as Antya
- 1996 Lalchee
- 1998 Dildara
- 1999 Dulhan Banoo Main Teri
- 1999 Lohpurush as D.C.P. Chaturvedi
- 1991 Zulmi as Bakhtawar/Chhotey
- 1999 A.K.47 (Kannada-Telugu)
- 2000 Shikari
- 2001 Yeh Raaste Hain Pyaar Ke as Bhanwarlal
- 2002 Jee Aayan Nu(Punjabi Movie)
- 2003 The Hero: Love Story of a Spy as Pak Colonel Hidayatullah
- 2003 Qayamat: City Under Threat as Pak Brigadier Raashid
- 2004 Asa Nu Maan Watna Da
- 2004 Hulchul as Pratap
- 2005 Dhamkee as Police Commissioner
- 2006 Ek Jind Ek Jaan
- 2006 Mannat
- 2006 Anokhe Amar Shaheed Baba Deep Singh Ji
- 2006 Aatma
- 2006 Dil Apna Punjabi
- 2007 Mitti Wajaan Maardi
- 2008 Mera Pind
- 2008 Mr Black Mr White
- 2009 Munde U.K. De
- 2010 Sadiyaan as Imran Noor Ahmed
- 2010 Chhevan Dariya (The Sixth River)
- 2011 The Lion of Punjab
- 2011 Jihne Mera Dil Luteya
- 2011 Khushiyaan
- 2012 Rehmataan
- 2012 Gal Sun Ho Gaya
- 2012 Ajj De Ranjhe
- 2012 Mitro - Mitro
- 2014 Little Terrors
- 2014 Fateh

=== Television ===
- 1988–1990 Mahabharat as Jayadratha
- 1993 Kanoon as Public Prosecutor Indrajeet Singh
- 1993-98 Zee Horror Show as Different roles
- 1994 Junoon
- 1994 Ajnabi as Passa
- 1998 Beta
- 1997 Betaal Pachisi as Jakali
- 1997 Jai Hanuman as Dasharatha
- 1998 Main Dilli Hoon as Jaichand
- 1999–2000 Gul Sanobar as Zargam
- 2002 Aryamaan – Brahmaand Ka Yodha as King Durdan
- 2004 Jai Maa Durga as Mahishasura
- 2003 Vishnu Puran as Sahasrarjuna
- 1994 Joshiley
- 2007 Jai Maa Durga as Mahishasura
- 2011-2013 Ek Hazaaron Mein Meri Behna Hai as Dadaji
