= Paani Ch Madhaani =

2021 Punjabi language romantic drama film

- Promotional poster
- Directed by: Vijjay Kumaar Arora
- Written by: Naresh Kathooria
- Produced by: Mani Dhaliwal; Sunny Raj; Dr.Prabhjot Singh Sidhu
- Starring: Gippy Grewal; Neeru Bajwa
- Cinematography: Jailesh Oberoi
- Edited by: Bunty Nagi
- Music by: Jatinder Shah
- Production companies: Dara Films Entertainment; Dara Motion Pictures Pvt Ltd.
- Distributed by: Omjee Star Studios
- Release date: 5 November 2021
- Running time: 127 minutes
- Country: India
- Language: Punjabi

Paani Ch Madhaani (transl. Churning of water) is a 2021 Indian Punjabi-language romantic comedy-drama film directed by Vijay Kumar Arora and produced by Mani Dhaliwal, Sunny Raj, and Prabhjot Sidhu under the banner of Dara Films Entertainment. The film, which stars Gippy Grewal and Neeru Bajwa, is set in the 1980s and is the story of a group of Punjabi musicians who travel to London to make their mark. It was released on 5 November 2021 to coincide with the Diwali festival in India.

== Premise ==
The story is about a flop singer Gulli and his group who focus on shortcuts (jugaad) for gaining success.

== Cast ==
- Gippy Grewal as Gulli
- Neeru Bajwa as Sohni
- Karamjit Anmol
- Gurpreet Ghuggi
- Iftikhar Thakur
- Harby Sangha
- Rupinder Rupi
- Sukhwinder Chahal as Gulli's father
- Gurpreet Bhangu as Gulli's mother
- Honey Mattu
- Shivam Sharma
- Parveen Aawara
- Nirmal Rishi

Special appearance

- Vinita Sharma as party guest
- Bikramjit Gurm as party guest
- Malkit Rauni
- Patrick Loh as Rich Chinese couple

== Production ==
Paani Ch Madhaani was announced on 16 June 2020 by lead actor Gippy Grewal. Gippy Grewal and co-star Neeru Bajwa last appeared together in the 2011 film Jihne Mera Dil Luteya. Principal photography began on 6 October 2020 in London. The film is a period romantic comedy-drama set in the 1980s.

== Release ==
Initially the film was scheduled for release on 12 February 2021 but it was then pushed back to 21 May 2021 due to the COVID-19 pandemic. Due to the closure of theaters the May release was then postponed even further. The film was finally released on 5 November 2021 to coincide with the Diwali festival.

=== Home media ===
The film is available for viewing on the Chaupal.

== Soundtrack ==
Paani Ch Madhaani

Soundtrack album by Jatinder Shah
- Released: 2021
- Genre: Feature film soundtrack
- Language: Punjabi
- Label: Humble Music

Jatinder Shah chronology
Daaka (2019)	Paani Ch Madhaani (2021)

The soundtrack album was released on Humble Music. The music was composed by Jatinder Shah and all the lyrics were written by Happy Raikoti. The first single, "Jean", which is sung by Gippy Grewal and Afsana Khan, was released on 19 October 2021. The song "VCR" was released on 30 October 2021.

Track list
No.	Title	Singer(s)	Length
1.	"Jean"	Gippy Grewal, Afsana Khan	5:19
2.	"Pind Pind"	Gippy Grewal	3:24
3.	"VCR"	Gippy Grewal, Afsana Khan	4:16
4.	"Taqdeere"	Ranjit Bawa	2:45
5.	"Jigre"	Gippy Grewal, Tarannum Malik	3:11
6.	"Mehmaan"	Jasbir Jassi	2:49
