= Navneet Nishan =

Indian actress

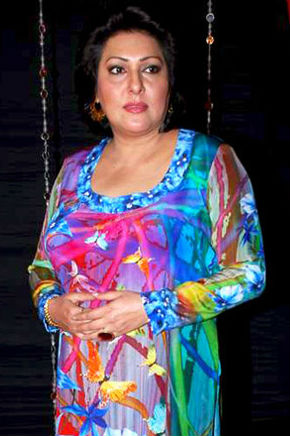
- Born: India 1962
- Occupation: Actor
- Years active: 1968–present

Navneet Nishan (also known as Navnit Nishan, Navnit or Navnit Singh) is an Indian actress. She is best known for her role as Tara in the soap opera Tara, and Kasautii Zindagii Kay. She has also worked in the TV serial Chanakya as Shonotra. She has acted in a number of Punjabi movies as well.

Nishan made her Bollywood debut in the film Jaan Tere Naam along with Ronit Roy as a supporting actress followed by Dilwale, Hum Hain Rahi Pyaar Ke, Raja Hindustani, Akele Hum Akele Tum, and Tum Bin. She also worked in Punjabi-language films like Jee Aayan Nu and Asa Nu Maan Watna Da.

== Filmography ==
=== Films ===
Year	Film	Role
1975	Mili	Young Mili
1988	Waaris	Channo
1990	Drishti	Gita
1991	Hai Meri Jaan	Nikki
1992	Jaan Tere Naam	Archana
1993	Bomb Blast (1993 film)	Tina
1993	Hum Hain Rahi Pyaar Ke	Maya
1994	Dilwale	Jyoti
1994	Khuddar	Jenny
1995	Akele Hum Akele Tum	Sunita
1996	Raja Hindustani	Kamal Singh / Kammo
1996	Ek Hasina Ek Nagina	Hasina
1996	Shohrat	Shama
1997	Jeeo Shaan Se	
1998	2001: Do Hazaar Ek	Kajal
1998	Achanak	Anjali
1999	Double Gadbad	Roopvati Kapoor
1999	Jaanam Samjha Karo	
1999	Pyaar Koi Khel Nahin	Pratima
2000	Mela	Bulbul
2000	Dhadkan	Nikki
2000	Kya Kehna	Mrs. Modi
2000	Hadh Kar Di Aapne	Mrs. Choudhury
2001	Tum Bin	Ayesha "Phuphu"
2001	Chhupa Rustam	Mrs Chinoyre
2002	Hadh Kar Di Aapne	Mrs Choudhury
2002	Waah! Tera Kya Kehna	Anju Oberoi
2002	Jee Aayan Nu	Kuldeep Grewal
2003	Aapko Pehle Bhi Kahin Dekha Hai	Jinni
2004	Yeh Lamhe Judaai Ke	Nisha
2004	Asa Nu Maan Watna Da	Harbans Dhillon
2004	Kaun Hai Jo Sapno Mein Aaya	Mrs. Kuldeep Khanna
2005	Bewafaa	Anjana "Anju" Sharma
2008	Mera Pind-My home	
2009	Ajab Prem Ki Ghazab Kahani	Mrs. Pinto
2009	Raat Gayi Baat Gayi	Jolly J. Saxena
2010	Ik Kudi Punjab Di	
2010	My Name is Khan	Rita Singh
2011	Always Kabhi Kabhi	Mrs. Dhawan
2013	Saadi Love Story	Bhua ji
2013	Matru Ki Bijlee Ka Mandola	Mrs. Talwar
2013	Ronde Saare Vyah Picho	
2014	Aa Gaye Munde U.K. De	Roopinder's Mother
2017	Qarib Qarib Singlle	Mrs. Saluja
2019	Ardab Mutiyaran	Darshana Chadda
2023	Rocky Aur Rani Kii Prem Kahaani	Yashpal's mother
2025	Badass Ravi Kumar	Ravi's mother

=== Television ===
Year	Show	Role
1991	Chanakya	Shonotra
1993	Zee Horror Show	
1993–1997	Tara	Tara
1994–1999	Andaaz	Urmila
1997	Dastaan	Neelam
1999	Main Anari Tu Anari	
2003	Jassi Jaissi Koi Nahin	Hansmukhi
2006–2007	Kyaa Hoga Nimmo Kaa	Honey Buns
2012	Hitler Didi	Simi Diwan Chandela
2013	Madhubala Ek Ishq Ek Junoon	Sharda Devi "Pabbo"
2014	Shastri Sisters	Nikki
2015	The Great Indian Family Drama	Mohini
2016–2017	Dil Deke Dekho	Tulsi Chopra

=== Web series ===
Year	Title	Role
2019	Coldd Lassi Aur Chicken Masala	Shaila
2023–2025	Chamak	Rocky Aunty
