= Gurpreet Ghuggi =

Indian actor, comedian and politician

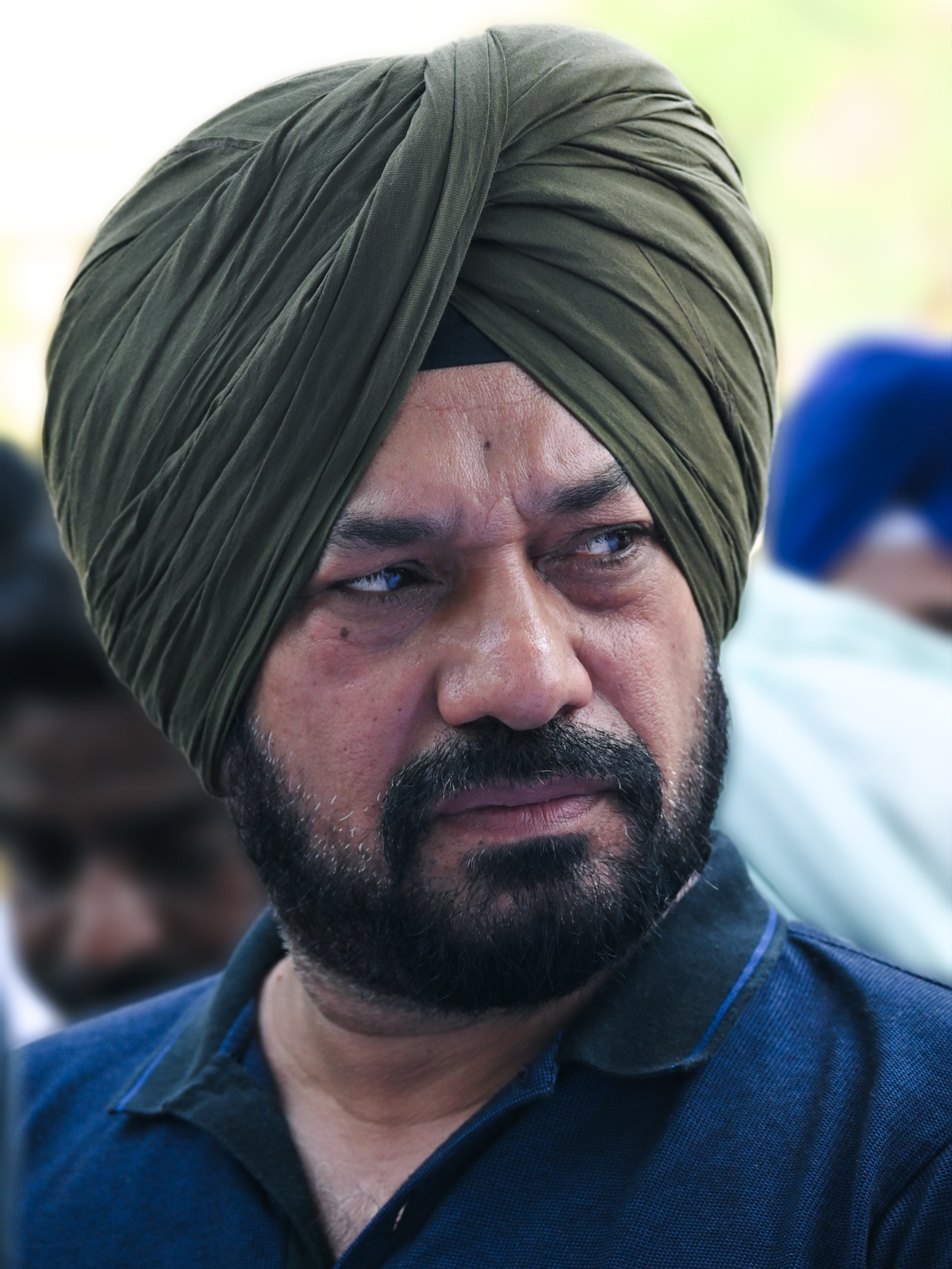

Convener of Aam Aadmi Party, Punjab
- In office 4 September 2016 – 8 May 2017
- Preceded by: Sucha Singh Chhotepur
- Succeeded by: Bhagwant Mann

Personal details
- Born: Gurpreet Singh Waraich; 19 June 1971 (age 55) Gurdaspur, Punjab, India
- Party: Aam Aadmi Party (2014–2017)
- Spouse: Kuljeet Kaur
- Children: 2
- Education: Guru Nanak Dev University
- Occupation: Actor; comedian; politician
- Notable work: Carry On Jatta; Ghuggi Khol Pitari; Ghuggi Chhoo Mantar; Ghuggi Yaar Gupp Na Maar; Ghuggi De Barati

Comedy career
- Genres: Films; Stand-up comedy; Television

Gurpreet Singh Waraich (born 19 June 1971), commonly known as Gurpreet Ghuggi, is an Indian actor, comedian and politician. He is known for his works in Punjabi and Hindi films. Ghuggi began his career by acting in theatre in the early 1990s, after which he had recurring roles in television series such as Ronak Mela and the soap opera Parchhaven. He gained international public recognition with comedic leading roles through his videos Ghuggi Junction (2003) and Ghuggi Shoo Mantar (2004), before beginning his film career by starring as Patwari Jhilmil Singh in Asa Nu Maan Watna Da (2004). He starred in the film Carry On Jatta (2012), and was praised for his meaningful leading role in Ardaas (2015).

== Personal life ==
Gurpreet Singh Waraich was born on 19 June 1971 in Gurdaspur in Punjab. He is married to Kuljeet Kaur with whom he has a son and a daughter. He is an eggetarian.

== Acting career ==
=== Early career ===
Ghuggi's career began with his appearance in several theatrical plays. In the 1990s, he got his break on television when he was cast in the comedic series, Ronak Mela. After Ronak Mela, Ghuggi had lead roles on the soap opera Parchhaven, playing a serious character, as well as on several shows, including Ghuggi Express and Ghuggi On Line.

=== 2004-present ===
Ghuggi's debut film role was in the romantic drama Jee Aayan Nu, in which he played a travel agency role. Released in 2002, the movie went direct-to-video. Soon after, he became a cast member in several films, including a breakthrough in 2015, when he was given the opportunity to play the lead role in Ardaas. His involvement in the film earned him the Filmfare Award for Best Actor (critics).

Alongside working in Punjabi cinema movies, Ghuggi has appeared in a few Bollywood and Canadian cinema films such as Singh Is Kinng and Breakaway. He received public recognition in India through his participation in The Great Indian Laughter Challenge, a reality show on STAR One. Later Ghuggi appeared with his wife, Kuljeet Kaur, on Star One's Hans Baliye and won the contest.

Ghuggi has appeared in live concerts such as Shounki Mela 2003 (along with Kamal Heer, Manmohan Waris and Sangtar), Vaisakhi Mela 2009 (along with Jazzy B and Sukhshinder Shinda) and Vaisakhi Mela 2010 (along with Nachatter Gill, Master Saleem and others).

In 2020, Ghuggi started a new talk show called Hasdeyaan De Ghar Vasde on Zee Punjabi and Zee5. Ghuggi hosts the show with Khushboo Grewal.

== Political career ==
In 2014, Waraich joined the Aam Aadmi Party (AAP). From 4 September 2016 to 10 May 2017, he had led AAP Punjab as the party's state convener but was replaced by Bhagwant Maan. After his replacement, he quit the party. He had contested from the Batala Assembly Constituency during the 2017 Punjab Legislative Assembly election but lost, placing third behind Lakhbir Singh Lodhinangal and Ashwani Sekhri.

== Discography ==
Year	Album	Record label
2018	Heereye Da Boldi	MovieBox
2015	Charai Yarran Di	Vanjhali Recordz
2012	Punjabi Gabru	Vanjhali Recordz
2007	Meri Vahuti Da Viyah	Shemaroo
2005	Ghuggi Khol Pitari	T-Series
2005	Tamasha Ghuggi Da	T-Series
2004	Ghuggi Shoo Mantar	T-Series
2004	Ghuggi Da Viah	T-Series
2003	Ghuggi De Bachche	T-Series
2003	Ghuggi Kare Kolki	Music Waves
2003	Ghuggi Junction	Plasma Records
2002	Tohfe Ghuggi De	T-Series

== Videography ==
Year	Title	Record label
2010	Ghasita Hawaldar Santa Banta Frar	Shemaroo
2010	Khich Ghuggi Khich	T-Series
2009	Ghuggi Hein Te Udd Ke Vakha	Eagle
2009	Ghuggi Labhey Gharwali	Shemaroo
2008	Ghuggi Yaar Gup Na Mar	Shemaroo
2008	Ghuggi De Barati	Tips
2007	Meri Vahuti Da Viyah	Shemaroo
2005	Ghuggi Khol Pitari	T-Series
2004	Ghuggi Chhoo Mantar	T-Series
2003	Ghuggi Junction	Plasma Records

== Filmography ==
=== Films ===
Key
†	Denotes films that have not yet been released.

- All films are in Punjabi, unless otherwise noted.

Year	Title	Role	Notes
2002	Jee Aayan Nu	Travel Agent	
2003	Pind Di Kudi	Lalli's uncle	
2004	Asa Nu Maan Watna Da	Patwari Jhilmil Singh	
2005	Nalaik	Mama	special appearance
2005	Jijaji	Mr. Sandhu	
2005	Yaaran Naal Baharan	Rangila	
2006	Dil Apna Punjabi	Prabhjot Singh Mundi	
2006	Humko Deewana Kar Gaye	Gurpreet Guggi	Hindi film
2006	Rab Ne Banayiyan Jodiyan	Tillu Singh/K.B. Singh 'Kabadiya'	
2006	Ek Jind Ek Jaan	Comedy King-Ghuggi	
2007	Namastey London	Taxi Driver	Hindi film
2007	Mitti Wajaan Maardi	Ambarsariya	
2008	Race	Police Inspector	Hindi film
2008	Singh Is Kinng	Manjeet Singh	Hindi film
2008	Mera Pind	Teetu Kalra	
2008	Chak De Phatte	Pinka Bhoond/Ratan Singh Tata	
2009	Ek: The Power of One	Guru	
2009	Jag Jeondeyan De Mele	Lucky/Mitha singh	Double role
2009	Tera Mera Ki Rishta	Wedding Planner	
2009	Munde U.K. De	Diljeet "DJ" Singh	
2009	Lagda Ishq Hogaya	Servant	
2009	Apni Boli Apna Des	Yankee Singh	
2010	Lad Gaya Pecha	Baljeet	
2010	Kabaddi Ik Mohabbat	Sukhi	
2010	Ik Kudi Punjab Di	Bawa	
2010	Mar Jawan Gur Khake	Inspector 420	
2011	The Lion of Punjab	Amrit's brother	
2011	Breakaway	Uncle Sammy	English-language film
2011	Naughty @ 40		Hindi film
2011	Khushiyaan		Hindi film
2011	Yaara o Dildaara	Kang	
2012	Pata Nahi Rabb Kehdeyan Rangan Ch Raazi	Preetam Singh	
2012	Joker	Cameraman	Hindi film
2012	Carry On Jatta	Honey Singh	
2012	YAAR Pardesi	Kamaljit Singh	
2012	Ajj De Ranjhe	Inspector Manjit Singh Phirki	
2012	Khiladi 786	Sukhi	Hindi film
2012	Dil Tainu Karda Ae Pyar		
2012	Yamley Jatt Yamley		
2013	Lucky Di Unlucky Story	Jelly	
2013	Jatts In Golmaal	Jugnu	
2013	Bhaji in Problem	Sandeep Cheema	
2013	Heer and Hero		
2014	Jatt James Bond	Binder	
2014	Fateh		
2014	Aa Gaye Munde U.K. De	DJ	
2014	Double Di Trouble		
2014	Happy Go Lucky	Harpal	
2015	Singh Of Festival		
2015	Second Hand Husband	Tea Seller	Hindi film
2015	Singh Is Bliing	Minister	Hindi film
2016	Ardaas	Gurmukh/ Masterji	
2016	Vaisakhi List	No Named Character	
2016	Ambarsariya	Hakim Manpreet	
2016	Lock	Harpal	
2017	Bandookan	Kulwinder	
2018	Carry on Jatta 2	Honey	
2018	Vadhayiyaan Ji Vadhayiyaan	Sukhi	
2018	Afsar		
2018	Son Of Manjeet Singh	Manjeet Singh	
2018	Aate Di Chidi		
2018	Jatt vs IELTS	Lakhwinder Singh	
2018	Laavaan Phere	Karnail Singh 'Kaila'	
2018	Raduaa		
2019	Band Vaaje		
2019	Ardaas Karaan		
2019	Naukar Vahuti Da	Goldie	
2021	Paani Ch Madhaani		Directed by Vijay Kumar Arora
2022	Ni Main Sass Kuttni		
2022	Bai Ji Kuttange		
2022	Cuttputlli	Guleria	Hindi film
2023	Es Jahano Door Kitte Chal Jindiye	Waryam Singh	
2023	Rang Ratta		
2023	Carry on Jatta 3	Honey	
2023	Mastaney	Qalandar	
2023	Dunki	Passenger at Laltu Station	Hindi film
2024	Master Scheme Singh †		Web series
2024	Ardaas Sarbat De Bhale Di	Gurmukh Singh	
2024	Raduaa Returns †	Sukhi	
2024	Manje Bistre 3		
2024	Ni Main Sass Kuttni 2		
2024	Panjab Files		
2025	Furlow	Sumitar Singh	
2025	Akaal: The Unconquered	Bhai Sukha Singh	
2025	Guru Nanak Jahaz	Baba Gurdit Singh	Punjabi film
