= Mera Pind =

- Directed by: Manmohan Singh
- Produced by: Manmohan Singh
- Starring: Navjot Sidhu; Harbhajan Mann; Kimi Verma; Gurpreet Ghuggi
- Cinematography: Manmohan Singh
- Music by: Babloo Kumar
- Distributed by: Adlabs
- Release date: 5 September 2008
- Country: India
- Language: Punjabi

Mera Pind (English: My village) is a Punjabi film released on 20 September 2008, directed and produced Manmohan Singh. The film stars Harbhajan Mann, Navjot Singh Sidhu, Kimi Verma and Gurpreet Ghuggi.

== Plot ==
Mera Pind is the story of a well-to-do Non-resident Indian Navjot Singh sidhu, who is played by Navjot Sidhu, who has chosen to settle in his native village and spread the message of empowerment and entrepreneurship among the village youth. Led by Himmat, played by Harbhajan Maan, the youth set off a revolution in the development of the village. The story inspires Punjabis who are increasingly opting to settle abroad, to undertake business in their own villages and cities. Mera Pind also includes a story of a young man seeking his love but has been shielded from the father of the woman he loves.

== Cast ==
- Navjot Sidhu
- Harbhajan Mann
- Kimi Varma
- Gugu Gill
- Sarabjit Mangat
- Deep Dhillon
- Navneet Nishan
- Sheeba Bhakri
- Rana Ranbir
- Gurpreet Ghuggi
- Darshan Aulakh
- Goldy Mann

== Box office ==
Mera Pind was successful at the box office, both domestically and overseas. In Punjab it broke the record of the highest opening for a Punjabi film, grossing 50 lakhs over its first weekend. Overseas the film had a limited release but did "extraordinary" business as it grossed 55 lakhs in the United Kingdom, 75 lakhs in North America and broke another record for the three-day total grossing 1.55 crore nett from just 25 prints. The film grossed a worldwide total of 2.75 crore nett from two weeks and was declared a Blockbuster.

== Music ==
- "Mera Pind" – Harbhajan Mann
- "Geda Cheda" – Harbhajan Mann, Rani Randeep
- "College" – Harbhajan Mann
- "Bhul Jaaye" – Harbhajan Mann
- "Jatt" – Harbhajan Mann, Labh Janjua
- "Chan Naal" – Harbhajan Mann, Rani Randeep
- "Bharavaan" – Harbhajan Mann
- "Dhaaba" – Harbhajan Mann, Rana Ranbir
