= Ek Jind Ek Jaan =

- Directed by: Chitraarth; Vikram Maini
- Produced by: Deepak Maini
- Starring: Raj Babbar; Nagma; Aryan Vaid; Mighty Gill; Deep Dhillon; Donny Kapoor; Kuldip Sharma; Ritu Shivpuri; Arun Bakshi
- Music by: Uttam Singh
- Distributed by: Eros International
- Release date: 2006
- Country: India
- Language: Punjabi

Ek Jind Ek Jaan is a 2006 Indian Punjabi-language film directed by Chitraarth and Vikram Maini. The film stars Raj Babbar, Nagma and Aryan Vaid.

== Plot ==
Sukhi (Raj Babbar) and Gurjeet (Ritu Shivpuri) become engaged, but trouble brews when the to-be bride discovers that her intended has no desire to procreate. You see, Sukhi has already taken on the responsibility of raising his young step-siblings which he feels will be more than enough child rearing for one lifetime. Gurjeet does not seem to be overjoyed by the prospect of raising someone else’s children. Rather than shatter Gurjeet’s dreams of starting a brood of her own, Sukhi decides that it is best to call off the marriage, despite Gurjeet’s brother Kundan (Deep Dhillon)’s offer to pay to have the step-kiddies shipped to a far off hostel so that the couple would not have to deal with them. Kundan is not pleased that Sukhi is refusing to retract his un-engagement to his sister and vow’s that the man is destined to be abandoned by his siblings once they have grown up.

=== 15 years later ===
Guddi, Channi, and Karma have grown up. Guddi is now a college student, and Channi is a medical student at Hero DMC Clinic.

On the other hand, having spent his childhood bunking school, the handsome, but educationally unmotivated Karma finds himself working a dead-end, low wage delivery job…Since childhood, slacker Karma has harbored a love for Nimmi (Nagma). Sadly, Nimmi and her family went away to the city many years ago and Karma has neither seen nor heard from her since. In flashback we see the young Karma (Ranvijay) and Nimmi (Rittu) as best friends. While Sukhi is seeing Nimmi and her family off at the train station for their move to the big city in hopes of a better life, young Karma is off trying to scrape up enough money to buy Nimmi a going away present, a set of red bangles which she specifically had wished for. Since Sukhi, a farmer, and Nimmi’s dad Dhanwant Singh (Arun Bakshi), a tongawala, are good friends they decide to fix the marriage of the two children right then and there, thus little Nimmi leaves on a happy note. Karma, with the red bangles, arrives at the station long after the train has departed and thus is unable to gift his friend the jewelry that he worked all day long to buy. Back to "15 Years Later" we find that Karma is still pining away for Nimmi. Seeing this, Sukhi decides it is time to reconnect with Dhanwant Singh and family and he sets off for the big, bad metropolis. What Sukhi does not realize yet is that Dhanwant has become a rich, successful, and uncaring capitalist who now has no intention of allowing his daughter to marry Karma, who he considers a penniless grunt. Humiliated, Sukhi returns to the village and tries to keep the disappointing news from Karma. But Karma finds out and decides to go to the city to find out what’s what with Nimmi.

Posing as an unemployed stranger he manages to worm his way into a washerman job at Singh’s palatial home, thanks to Dhanwant’s kind wife, who has no idea that the new employee is the now grown-up little boy who had been her daughter Nimmi’s best friend. Into the scene walks Nimmi, all grown up and acting pricey. Her attitude does not deter Karma, who still loves her. Nimmi, however, now has a fiancée, a beefy tennis player named Pal (Sameep Kang). Karma refuses to accept defeat and, while still posing as a household servant, vows to learn why Nimmi has forgotten him and taken another. But when he is in danger of losing Nimmi for good, he reveals the truth about who he is during Nimmi and Pal’s engagement party.

Will Nimmi remember Karma? And if so, would her father ever allow her to marry him? Will Pal break Karma’s instrument? And if so, how will Karma and Nimmi ever make sweet music together? Will Sukhi ever get over his insult at the hands of his former friend, Dhanwant? And will his step siblings really abandon him as Kundan had predicted? And what of Channi and Guddi? Will these two siblings develop plotlines of their own?

== Cast ==
Star:	Character:
Raj Babbar	Sukhdev Singh
Ritu Shivpuri	Gurjeet
Nagma	Nimmi Kang
Aryan Vaid	Karamvir Singh
Arun Bakshi	Dhanwant Singh Kang
Kulbir Badesron	mother of Nimmi
Deep Dhillon	Kundan Singh
Mighty Gill	Channi Singh
Gurpreet Ghuggi	
Satwant Kaur	Nimmi's mother
Harbhajan Jabbal	
Sumeep Kang	Pal Jindal
Donny Kapoor	Matto D. Singh
Jatinder Kaur	
B.N. Sharma	Subedar Kapoor Singh
Prabhleen Sandhu	Guddi

== Soundtrack ==
Singer Pawni Pandey made her debut with the song "Cheecho Cheech Ganeriyan".

== Reception ==
Manish Gajjar of BBC wrote that "This is a heart warming Punjabi story of relationships, love and revenge".
