= Kimi Verma =

Indian-American actress

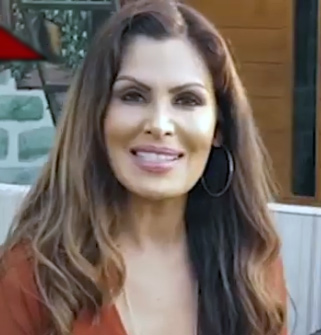
- Kimi Verma in 2019
- Born: November 20, 1977 (age 49); Punjab, India
- Occupation: Actress

Kimi Verma (born 20 November 1977) is an Indian-American actress and fashion designer who predominantly works in Punjabi films.

== Early life ==
Kimi was born in Punjab on November 20, 1977, then later moved to the city of Mumbai in India. Whilst working on her MBA at Bombay University, Kimi moved to Los Angeles and currently resides there. Kimi owns a small women's fashion house and is the Lead Designer and CEO of the company.

Kimi won the title of Miss Bombay and the Femina Miss India Beautiful Hair title in 1994. She has appeared in approximately nine movies, mainly Punjabi, in her near 30 year career. At present, she works as a clothing designer and lives in Los Angeles, California.

== Career ==
Kimi's film career started with a small role in the film, Naseebo (1994) and was followed by a few Punjabi-language films, such as, Jee Aayan Nu, Asa Nu Maan Watna Da and Mera Pind - My Home.

== Filmography ==
- 1994 Naseebo
- 2000 Shaheed Udham Singh
- 2002 Jee Aayan Nu
- 2004 Asa Nu Maan Watna Da
- 2006 Daisygowri: A Love Story(TV Movie, English)
- 2008 Mera Pind-My home
- 2009 Sat Shri Akal
- 2010 Ik Kudi Punjab Di
- 2012 Ajj De Ranjhe
- 2021 Parvaaz: The Journey
- 2023 LehmberGinni
