= Munde U.K. De =

- Official film poster
- Directed by: Manmohan Singh
- Starring: Jimmy Sheirgill; Amrinder Gill; Neeru Bajwa; Gurpreet Ghuggi; Rana Ranbir
- Music by: Sukshinder Shinda, Babloo Kumar
- Release date: 8 May 2009 (India)
- Country: India
- Language: Punjabi

Munde U.K. De (lit. 'Boys from the U.K.'; distributed in English-speaking territories with the additional tagline "British by Right, Punjabi by Heart!"), is a 2009 Indian Punjabi-language romantic comedy film by writer-director Manmohan Singh. It stars Jimmy Sheirgill, Amrinder Gill, Neeru Bajwa, Rana Ranbir, and Gurpreet Ghuggi. The film was released in India 8 May 2009, and in Los Angeles, California, US, on 22 May 2009, among other territories. It has a running time of 149 minutes.

== Plot ==
Two young British Punjabi men visit their homeland, Punjab: Roop Singh, comes to see his grandfather, Gurdit Singh and Roop's touristy pal DJ comes to see how Punjab is like. Roop meets Reet Brar, a university classmate of his cousin Deepi's, and falls for her, and DJ falls for brainy, Kulwant Kaur, another classmate. Roop agrees to let his aunt be his matchmaker and set up an arranged marriage for himself and Reet, but the modern-thinking Reet wants no part of what she considers outmoded provincialism. Her father angrily sets up an arranged marriage for her with Jagjot Gill. Reet, however, reconsiders and realizes she loves Roop after all, and Kulwant falls for DJ too. Reet tells Jagjot, that she loves Roop a lot, so to help the lovers Jagjot says he's not ready to get married. After this incident no boy will marry Reet so, Reet's father and her ne'er-do-well brother,Jaile, devise a plan to figure out if Roop really loves Reet: Her father will give his consent if Roop can find a British bride for Jaile, which will prove that Roop is ready to do anything for Reet. DJ calls in an old girlfriend from UK, party girl, Candy, who flies in to help. They plan a scheme which will scare Jaile away. Candy acts like a traditional, Punjabi girl, and wins Jaile's heart, so they fix, Roop and Reet's and Jaile and Candy's engagement for the same day. Candy tells Kulwant that DJ was in many relationships with many different girls, since she still loves DJ. After hearing this, Kulwant is heart-broken, and leaves DJ. Day before the engagement Candy reveals how modern girls really are, by bringing Jaila to a pub. On the engagement day Jaile runs away. Candy tells DJ, that if he doesn't sit in Jaile's spot, she will reveal the truth. So to help out his friend, DJ and Candy get engaged and so do Roop and Reet.

== Cast ==
- Jimmy Sheirgill - Roop Singh
- Neeru Bajwa - Reet Brar
- Gurpreet Ghuggi – DJ
- Akshita Vasudeva—Kulwant Kaur
- Amrinder Gill – Jagjot Gill
- Deep Dhillon – Mr. Brar
- Sunita Dheer- Mrs. Brar
- Arun Bali – Gurdit Singh
- Rana Ranbir – Khoji, the house manager
- Khushboo Grewal – Candy
- Binnu Dhillon - Jaile Brar, Reet's brother
- Teenu Sharma - Deepi, Roop's cousin
- Kulbir Badesron - Roop's aunt
- Atro - Old lady on tractor

== Soundtrack ==
Source: H. S. Communication press release

Munde U.K. De

Soundtrack album by Sukhshinder Shinda and Babloo Kumar
- Released: Early 2009
- Recorded: 2009
- Genre: Punjabi
- Label: Tips Industries
- Producer: Sukhshinder Shinda and Babloo Kumar

All lyrics are written by Babu Singh Maan and Amarjeet Musapuria; all music is composed by Sukshinder Shinda and Babloo Kumar.

Munde U.K. De
No.	Title	Singer	Length
1.	"Ishq Ho Gaya"	Amrinder Gill
2.	"Ik Kudi Utte Aya Mera Dil"	Jasbir Jassi and Miss Pooja
3.	"Kuch Bol Jubhano Bol"	Sardool Sikander
4.	"Do Ghut Peelay"	Sunidhi Chauhan
5.	"Munde UK De"	Labh Janjua
6.	"Dil Milyan De Mela"	Amrinder Gill
7.	"Kudiyan Vekhan Aye"	Ravinder Grewal, Sudesh Kumari,
8.	"Ik Kudi Utte Aya Mera Dil (remix)"	Jasbir Jassi and Miss Pooja

== Reception ==
Frank Lovece of Film Journal International concurred, saying the "unexceptional romantic comedy won't turn any U.S. cineastes into Punjwood aficionados, and lacks the production values and star power Indian-American audiences have come to expect. ... The movie has modest charms ... but they're often drowned out by a bombastically melodramatic score, and lots of sitting-around-talking scenes with go-nowhere dialogue". Singah, he wrote, "shoots with dull, flattened lighting far removed from Bollywood's typical crystalline sheen". Maitland McDonagh of MissFlickChick.com took a middle ground, calling the film "overlong, painfully clichéd but occasionally surprisingly sly and clever".

== Sequel ==
In February 2014 it was announced that there would be a sequel to Munde U.K. De, entitled Aa Gaye Munde U.K. De. The movie marks the third time a Punjabi film has had a sequel made. The film is releasing on 8 August 2014 and was featuring much of the same cast, including of Jimmy Sheirgill, Neeru Bajwa, Gurpreet Ghuggi and crew of the first film.
