= Satwant Kaur =

Indian film and television actress

- Born: December 5, 1968 (age 57); Sirsa, India
- Occupations: Actress, model, Social worker
- Years active: 1997 – present
- Spouse: Tarsem Singh
- Children: 2
- Website: official FB

Satwant Kaur is an Indian film and television actress who works in Punjabi and Hindi films. She started her career through Punjabi music videos, television soap operas and telefilms in the earlier days and ended up appearing in the films. She is known for her portrayals in movies like Ik Jind Ik Jaan (2006), Singh Is Kinng (2008), Majaajan (2008), Ardaas (2016), Dev D (2009), Udta Punjab (2016), TV Serial Kach Diyan Wanga and Gurdas Maan's video song Pind Dian Galian etc., along with many others.

== Family background ==
Kaur was born into a Punjabi Sikh family in Sirsa, Haryana, India. Her father name was Gurdayal Singh and mother name was Mukhtiar Kaur. She completed her education in Sirsa. She married Tarsem Singh in 1989, her husband has always supported her to pursue her acting career. Family is settled in Mohali and have two children.

== Early career ==
She made her debut with appearing in a music video Akhan Billian Gallan Di Gori by Singer Mikki Singh in 1997. She starred in many other videos but Gurdas Maan's Pind Dian Galian song helped her in gaining fame.

== Film and television career ==
In 2006, Kaur played a role in Ik Jind Ik Jaan, where she was portrayed as Nagma's mother. Then she appeared in many Punjabi and Hindi movies like Singh Is Kinng, Dev D, Udta Punjab, Rabb Da Radio, Waris Shah: Ishq Daa Waaris, Dil Apna Punjabi, Tere Naal Love Ho Gaya, Kaafila. She has starred in about 34 movies including 8 Bollywood movies. She is busy in few upcoming movie projects.

== Filmography ==
=== Films ===
Year	Film	Role	Special Notes
2006	Ik Jind Ik Jaan	Nimmi's Mother	
2006	Dil Ki Kare		TV Movie
2006	Waris Shah: Ishq Daa Waaris	Saabo's Mother	
2006	Dil Apna Punjabi	—	
2007	Kaafila	—	Hindi Movie
2008	Singh Is Kinng	Mika & Lucky's Mother	Hindi Movie
2008	Majaajan	Gulabo	
2008	Hashar: A Love Story	Shagan's Mother	
2008	Chak De Phatte	Woman from Canada	
2009	Jag Jeondeyan De Mele	Mrs. Waraich- Shavi's mother	
2009	Dev D	Kaushalya Dhillon- Dev's mother	Hindi Movie
2009	Heer Ranjha: A True Love Story	—	
2009	Akhiyaan Udeekdian	Kesar Kaur	
2010	Ekam - Son of Soil	—	
2010	A Flat	Mrs. D. Singh	Hindi Movie
2011	Naughty @ 40	Sayali's Mother	Hindi Movie
2011	Yaar Annmulle	Aman's mother	
2012	Tere Naal Love Ho Gaya	—	Hindi Movie
2012	Pure Punjabi	Prem's mother	
2013	Jatt Boys Putt Jattan De	Mrs. Brar- Waris's Mother	
2013	Jatt Airways	Gill's Wife	
2014	Titoo MBA	Titoo's mother	Hindi Movie
2015	Myself Pendu	Mrs. Grewel	
2015	Gaddar: The Traitor	Jai's mother	
2015	The Mastermind Jinda Sukha	Sukha's mother	
2016	Udta Punjab	Sartaj's Mother	Hindi Movie
2016	Ardaas	Lady Doctor	
2016	Kaptaan	—	
2016	Lakeeran	—	
2017	Rabb Da Radio	Manjinder's Bhua	
2017	Saab Bahadar	Sarpanch's wife	
2017	Sargi	Babbu's mother	
2017	Sat Shri Akaal England	Satwant Kaur Kahlon	
2018	Omerta	Qaisra Sheikh- Omar's mother	Hindi Movie
2018	Qismat	Baani's mother	
2018	Titanic		
2018	Yaar Belly		
2019	Ishqaa		
2019	Rabb Da Radio 2		
2019	Gadri Yodhe		
2022	Ni Main Sass Kutni		
TBA	Visa The Movie		Upcoming Movie
TBA	Panj Khaab		Upcoming Movie

=== Television serials ===
Serial	Role
Kach Diyan Wanga	Gurmeet
Kinna Sona Tenu Rabne Banaya	
Chann Charhiya Samundron Paar	
Bhagan Walian	
Saude Dilan De	

=== Telefilms ===
Telefilm	Role
Karun Ardas	
Sat Bhakhe Ravidas	
Baba Balak Nath	
Karma	
Maa Da Dil	
Shiv Mahima	
Main Jan Tera	
