= Yaaran Naal Baharan =

- Directed by: Manmohan Singh
- Written by: Manmohan Singh
- Produced by: Samit Brar; Dalwinder Lidher; Preetpal Shergil
- Starring: Jimmy Sheirgill; Juhi Babbar; Raj Babbar; Anupam Kher; Sharhaan Singh
- Cinematography: Harmeet Singh
- Music by: Jaidev Kumar
- Distributed by: Yash Raj Films
- Release date: 2005
- Country: India
- Language: Punjabi

Yaaran Naal Baharan is a 2005 Indian Punjabi-language feature film directed by Manmohan Singh. It stars Jimmy Sheirgill and Juhi Babbar. A spiritual sequel, Yaraan Naal Baharaan 2, followed in 2012, directed by Samit Brar starring Vikramjeet Virk and Rishita Monga in the lead roles.

== Plot ==
This film tells a story of young hearts seeing each other and falling in love; this falling in love makes their life so different and beautiful. It shows the college life of students, their hostel life, the way they enjoy themselves in the college and the hard work they put in for their studies. Fellow students of Punjab University, Navdeep Singh and Harman Kaur, fall in love with each other. Both start to dream of a happy life together. But problems arise when they think of taking their parent's consent before going any further. Harman's father Col. Thakur Singh is a typical Punjabi father with a big ego who does not appreciate the idea of his daughter selecting a groom herself. Deep's Father, Retired Major Balwinder Singh Brar, also opposes this alliance, and wants his son to complete his studies before getting married. Balwinder subsequently changes his mind but wants Thakur to adapt to tradition and approach him – but Thakur refuses to do so. The couple then conspire with their fellow students and arrange for their parents to meet on neutral ground. It is this decision that will shatter and change their lives forever. Now both Navdeep and Harmaan are in a dilemma: neither can they go against their parents, nor can they live without each other. How they convince their parents about their relationship without hurting their sentiments is the rest of the story.

== Cast ==
- Jimmy Shergill as Navdeep 'Deep' Singh Brar
- Juhi Babbar as Harman Kaur
- Raj Babbar as Retd. Major Balwinder J. Brar (Deep's Father)
- Sunita Dhir as Balwinder's Wife (Deep's Mother)
- Anupam Kher as Retd. Col. Thakur Singh (Harman's Father)
- Ketki Dave as Geeta – Thakur's Wife (Harman's Mother)
- Naren as Pawan (Deep's Haryanvi Friend)
- Sharhaan Singh as deep's friend (harry)
- Gavie Chahal as Deep's Friend
- Sharhaan Singh as Deep's Friend
- Prabhleen Sandhu as Harman's friend
- Rupi Kamboj as Jeeti Kaur – Deep's sister
- Sonika Gill as Mandeep Kaur 'Mini'
- Gurpreet Ghuggi as Rangila
- Vivek Shauq as Ghinda Mann
- Sudeepa Singh as Harman's friend

== Soundtrack ==
Track #	Title	Singer(s)
1	"College Vich Padna"	Sukhwinder Singh
2	"Dil Nai Lagda"	Sardool Sikander
3	"Haan De Munde"	Sukhwinder Singh, Jaspinder Narula, Amrinder Gill & Simerjeet Kumar
4	"Khedan De Din Chaar"	Sunidhi Chauhan & Amrinder Gill
5	"Le Mein Teri"	Sunidhi Chauhan & Arvinder Singh
6	"Luk Luk"	Feroz Khan
7	"Yaraan Naal Baharaan"	Sukhwinder Singh
