= Mitti Wajaan Maardi =

- Distributed by: Adlabs Films
- Release date: 2007
- Country: India
- Language: Punjabi

Mitti Wajaan Maardi (English: The Soil Calls), is a 2007 Indian Punjabi film directed by Manmohan Singh.

== Plot ==
Surjit Singh goes to America but leaves behind his wife and two-year-old daughter in Punjab. In order to receive American citizenship he marries for a second time.

Later, a wealthy man, Surjit hopes his son, Varyam, will marry the daughter of his best friend back in Punjab but his plans are soon put on hold when he discovers he is dying. On his death bed he reveals the truth of his first marriage to his son, and begs him to make things right with his first family.

== Cast ==
- Harbhajan Mann
- Japji Khera
- Gurpreet Ghuggi
- Mahi Gill
- Rana Ranbir
- Binnu Dhillon
- Dolly Minhas
- Kanwaljit
- Vivek Shauq
