= Jee Aayan Nu =

Jee Ayan Nu
- Jee Aayan Nu Movie Poster
- Directed by: Manmohan Singh
- Written by: Baldev Gill
- Produced by: Bhushan Kumar; Krishan Kumar
- Starring: Harbhajan Mann; Priya Gill; Kimi Verma; Navneet Nishan
- Cinematography: Harmeet Singh
- Music by: Jaidev Kumar
- Production company: Super Cassettes Industries Ltd.
- Distributed by: SPE Films India
- Release date: 8 November 2002
- Country: India
- Language: Punjabi

Jee Ayan Nu (transl. Welcome) is an Indian Punjabi-language drama film, released on 8 November 2002., It stars Harbhajan Mann and Priya Gill, It was directed by Manmohan Singh.

== Plot ==
Grewal, a Punjabi media tycoon, lives in Vancouver, British Columbia, Canada, with his wife and daughter. Simar, the elder daughter, was three years old when she moved to Canada from Punjab, where she was born. Both daughters have been greatly influenced by the local culture while enjoying a luxurious lifestyle in Canada. Many years later, Grewal returns to Punjab with his family to attend a college function. There, he meets Inder, the son of an old friend. He asks Inder to show Simar around and introduce her to the beauty of Punjab.

While sightseeing, Inder showed Simar how loving and good-natured the people of Punjab were and how beautifully their culture had been preserved. Although Simar was impressed, her mother did not feel at home in her own country or comfortable with its way of life. Inder and Simar soon fell in love, and their families arranged their marriage. However, at the engagement ceremony, Inder realised that Simar's family expected him to settle in Canada with them after the wedding. He refused to leave Punjab. Annoyed with him, the Grewal family returned to Canada.

Time passed, and seeing how much Inder was suffering without Simar, his parents insisted he go to Canada and win her back. He left, determined to succeed.

== Cast ==
- Harbhajan Mann as Inderveer Singh
- Priya Gill as Simar
- Kimi Verma as Jassi
- Kanwaljit Singh as Jasbir Grewal
- Navneet Nishan as Kuldeep Grewal
- Gurpreet Ghuggi as Ghugi
- Deep Dhillon as Arjun Singh
- Vivek Shauq as Iqbal
- Satinder Satti as Satti
- Gopi Bhalla
