= K. S. Makhan =

Punjabi wrestler, actor, singer and politician

KS Makhan
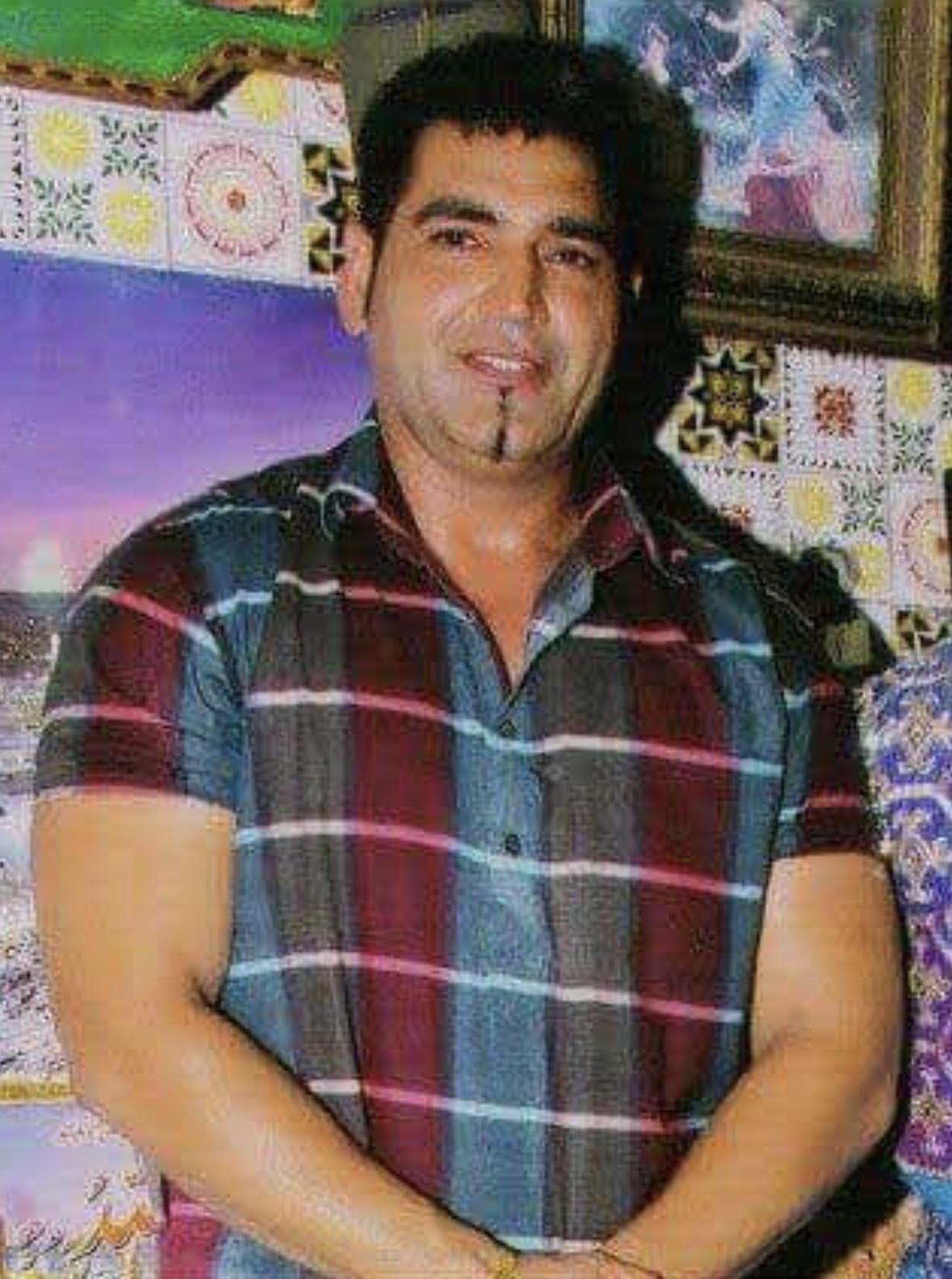
- KS Makhan in 2012

Background information
- Also known as: Saan Jatt
- Born: Kuldeep Singh Takhar
- Genres: Punjabi, Bhangra, Romantic, Pop, Folk
- Occupations: Singer, actor, Politician, Athlete, Sports Promoter
- Instruments: Voice
- Years active: 1997–present
- Labels: Speed Records, T-Series, Movie Box, Music Waves, Planet Records

KS Makhan (born Kuldeep Singh Takhar) is a Punjabi Indian wrestler turned singer, actor, politician, sports promoter, and songwriter.

== Career ==
Makhan is a former kabaddi player and is known for his contribution to the sport, as well as wrestling. He is well known for his motivational songs regarding sports and health such as, Sir Kadhve Record, Daulian Ch Jaan, and Parwah.

KS Makhan's first album was Numbra Te Dil Milde. He has worked with music producer Aman Hayer and musicians Sukhpal Sukh and Atul Sharma. His albums include Glassi, Billo, Muskan, Yaar Mastaane, Good Luck Charm, and James Bond. His other tracks are "Mitran Di Motor", "Takle", "Gabru Top Da", "Fight", "Talwaaran", "Sitare", "Jatt Warga Yaar", "Band Botle", "Badmaashi", and "Pakka Yaar". In 2012, he reached number one with his track "Dil Vich Vas Gayi". By the end of 2012, he had gained so much popularity (particularly in the Doaba region) that he had as many as 3 bookings of live music per day. In early 2013, he quit music and live performances and only did a handful of music work until 2020 when he made his comeback with the song "Willpower". In 2021, his song "Flood Back" gained popularity, allowing him to start performing worldwide again.

== Film career ==
In 2012, Makhan made his film debut in film Pinky Moge Wali, with a cast including Gavie Chahal, Neeru Bajwa, and Geeta Zaildar. He played the role of 'Villain' in this film. His next film was Sajjan – The Real Friend, which was released in January 2013, where he was lead actor. Later on, he was part of films including Kirdar e Sardar, Jugni Hath Kise na Auni, and a unreleased film called Jatt Pardesi, which also starred the Indian Cinema Megastar Dharmendra.

== Politics ==
K.S. Makhan joined the Bahujan Samaj Party on 9 February 2014. He was a candidate from Anandpur Sahib (Lok Sabha constituency) for the 2014 Lok Sabha elections., finishing fourth with 69,124 votes. In 2016, Makhan joined the Shromani Akali Dal party.

== Discography ==
| Year | Album/EPs | Label | Composed | No. of Tracks | Format |
| 2026 | Champion Chapter 1 | KS Makhan Records | Aman Hayer | 9 | Digital |
| | 4X4 | KS Makhan Records | Nishan Gill | 4 | Digital |
| 2025 | Pump Up | KS Makhan Records | Aman Hayer | | |
| 2022 | Return Of The Mak | Biillions Records | Aman Hayer | TBA | Digital |
| 2015 | Dastaar | Sony Music Entertainment | Aman Hayer | 8 | CD |
| 2013 | Khalse Kalgidhar De | Shemaroo Shine Star | Beat Minister | 7 | CD |
| 2012 | James Bond (UK & India); 007(Canada) | MovieBox Records (UK) T-Series (India); Music Waves (Canada) | Aman Hayer | 8 | CD |
| 2010 | Good Luck Charm | Music Waves (Canada & India) MovieBox Records (UK) | Aman Hayer | 8 | CD |
| 2008 | Yaar Mastane | Music Waves (Canada & India) Genie Records (UK) | Aman Hayer | 10 | CD & Cassette |
| 2006 | Muskaan | T-Series | Aman Hayer | 10 | CD & Cassette |
| 2005 | Billo | T-Series (India) Golden Star Video (Canada & USA) | Aman Hayer & Tarun Rishi | 10 | CD & Cassette |
| 2005 | Kismat Bana Do Maa | T-Series | Lal-Kamal | 8 | Cassette |
| 2004 | Pio Milje Kalghidhar Warga | T-Series (India) Music Waves (Canada) | Sukhpal Sukh | 8 | CD & Cassette |
| 2003 | Mastaani (India) Dildar (UK & Canada) | T-Series (India) Genie Records (UK) | Aman Hayer | 8 & 10 | CD & Cassette |
| 2002 | Jwani (India & Canada) First Play (UK) | T-Series (India) Planet Recordz (Canada) Calibre Records (UK) | Aman Hayer | 8 | CD & Cassette |
| 2001 | Lal Pari | Audio Touch | Sukhpal Sukh, Gurmeet Singh | 9 | CD & Cassette |
| 2001 | Mitran Di Motor | DMC Records (UK) | | 8 | CD & Cassette |
| 2000 | Glassi | Audio Touch | Sukhpal Sukh, Lal-Kamal | 8 | CD & Cassette |
| 1999 | Friendship Sohni Sohni | Rhythm Audio Kamlee Records DMC Records | Ashu Singh | 8 | CD & Cassette |
| 1997 | Mehfal Mittran Dee | Hi-Tech Music DMC Records | Santosh Kataria & Sanjeev | 8 | CD & Cassette |
| 1996 | Yaaran Naal Bahara | Amrit Music Center | | 8 | Cassette |
| 1995 | Numberaan Te Dil Milde | TPM Audio Cassette | Ramesh Batlavi | 8 | Cassette |

== Singles ==
| Year | Song | Label | Composer |
|---|---|---|---|
| 2024 | JATT ZINDABAAD | Hot Shot Music | Jugraj cheema |
| 2025 | GAL NOTAN DI | Hotshot Music | Gagan Ratti |
| 2021 | High Spirits | Prince G Entertainment | Prince G |
| 2020 | I Am Back | Sniper Records | Snappy |
| 2020 | Brand | Hayer Records | Money Aujla |
| 2020 | Lumbi Race De Ghore | Elite Music | Aman Hayer |
| 2020 | Willpower | Geet MP3 | Money Aujla |
| 2019 | Mera Sardar | VS Records | Amdad Ali |
| 2018 | Mangal Grah | Beat Motion Productions | Harj Nagra |
| 2018 | Star | Speed Records | Prince Ghuman |
| 2017 | Gaddar Bande | Rehaan Records | V Grooves |

== Filmography ==
| Release | Film | Role | Notes | Label | Presentation |
|---|---|---|---|---|---|
| 2012 | Pinky Moge Wali | Akaal | Film debut | T-Series | Batra Showbiz |
| 2013 | Sajjan-The Real Friend | Sajjan | With Sanvi Dhimaan, Simran Sachdeva | T-Series | Takhar Productions |
| 2013 | Shatranj (Sheh Ke Maat) | | With Preet Sidhu, Mani Kapoor | | Sidhu Films |
| 2014 | Jatt Pardesi | Manjinder Singh | | T-Series | Kala Nizampuri |
| 2017 | Jugni Hath Kise Na Auni | | | Lokhdun | Sidhu Films |

== Tagged Songs ==
| Release | Song | Album | Record label | Notes |
|---|---|---|---|---|
| 2017 | | Headline Mission | Speed Records | With Prince Ghuman, Nachhatar Gill, Sippy Gill, Preet Harpal, Kanth Kaler & More |
| 2014 | | Jakara 2 | Dharam Seva Records T-Series | With Nick Sahota, Jaz Dhami, Meshi Eshara, Preet Harpal |
| 2013 | Malang Baniye | Malang Baniye – Single | 4 Play Music T-Series | With Dr. Zeus & Young Fateh |
| 2013 | Muqabala | Muqabala | Shemaroo | With Prince Ghuman, Bohemia (musician) |
| 2012 | Nach Mitran Naal | Nach Mitran Naal | T-Series, Music Waves | With Debi Makhsoospuri, Raj Brar, Inderjit Nikku, Harbhajan Shera |
| TBA | | Gold Label | Planet Recordz | With Late Soni Pabla, Geeta Zaildar, Kanth Kaler, Mika Singh. |
| 2012 | Dil Vich Vas Gayi | Dil Vich Vas Gayi | T-Series | With Kanth Kaler, Ranjit Mani, Amar Arshi, Sabar Koti. |
| 2012 | Yaar Velly | Brave Heart 2 | Music Cafe | With Surinder Sangha, Amar Singh, Nirmal Sidhu. |
| 2011 | Badmashi | Musical Gangsters The Gangsters | Planet Recordz Speed Records | With Sarbjit Cheema, Gippy Grewal, Raj Brar, Jassi Sohal. |
| 2011 | Parwah | The Entourage | MovieBox Speed Records | With Aman Hayer, Gippy Grewal, Geeta Zaildar, Angrej Ali & Dev Dhillon. |
| 2010 | Anakh Naal Din Kattiye | En Karma | T-Series Music Waves Moviebox | With En Karma, Inder Kooner, H-Dhami, G Money, Battle Kat & More. |
| 2010 | Daulian Ch Jaan | Put Your Hands Up | Speed Records Planet Recordz | With Gippy Grewal, Mangi Mahal, Miss Pooja, Inderjit Nikku. |
| 2009 | Fight | Brave Heart | Music Cafe | With Surinder Sangha, Amar Singh, Nirmal Sidhu, Angrej Ali. |
| 2005 | Ik Ghut | Groundshaker | Genie Records Planet Recordz T-Series | With Angrej Ali, Lehmber Hussainpuri, Feroz Khan, Nirmal Sidhu |
| 2003 | Neendran | Reminisce | Planet Recordz T-Series Genie Rocords | With Lehmber Hussainpuri, Feroz Khan, Manak-E, MC Special. |
| 2001 | | Deep Impact II | Golden Star Video | With Sarbjit Cheema, Pammi Bai, Balkar Sidhu, Gill Hardeep. |
| 2000 | Apna Standard | Kala Doriya | Tips | With Shankar Sahni, Amrita Virk, Lovely Nirmann, Sandeep Akhtar. |
| 1997 | Hoopeh | Dhol Beat Dho | Music Waves Kiss Records Venus Music | With Sukshinder Shinda, Jazzy B, Bhinda Jatt & Kuldeep Manak |
