= Sarbjit Cheema =

Indian actor and singer

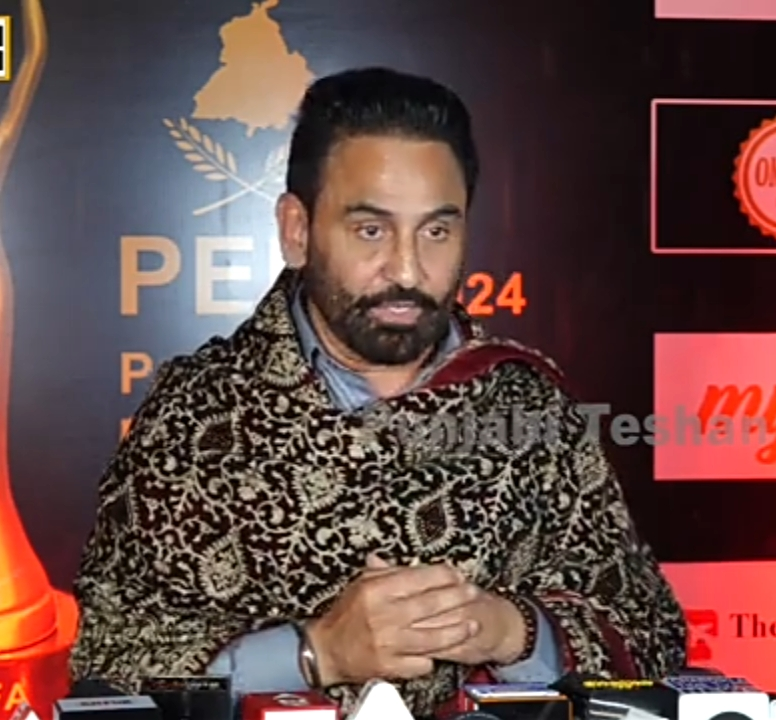

Background information
- Born: Sarabjit Singh Cheema; Jalandhar, Punjab, India
- Genres: Punjabi, Bhangra, Boliyan, Gidha
- Occupations: Singer, songwriter, lyricist, actor
- Instruments: Tumbi
- Years active: 1993–present
- Labels: T-Series, Kamlee Records, Speed Records, Music Waves
- Website: www.sarbjitcheema.com

Sarbjit Singh Cheema is an Indian-Canadian singer and actor who associated with Punjabi music and films. He made his singing debut with the album Yaar Nachde and He started his film career with Pind Di Kurhi.

== Early life ==
Sarbjit Singh Cheema was born in the Jalandhar district of Punjab, India. He moved to Canada in 1989.

== Career ==
Cheema's most successful album was "Chandigarh Shaher Di Kuddi". He has performed in the rock genre with Boliyan and Gidha Beats. His Punjabi song Rangla Punjab, from his album Mela Vekhdiye Mutiyare, was released in 1996. Many times his albums' music was produced by musician Sukhpal Sukh and Atul Sharma. Now he is working with musician Aman Hayer. He has sung many Boliyan in his albums. Cheema Has two religious albums. He has 12 studio albums. His new album "Indian Sardari" was scheduled to release in October 2016.

== Discography ==
Year	Album	Music	Record label
2013	Duniya	Dr. Zeus	Vanjhali Recordz
2012	Bole So Nihal	Aman Hayer & Prince Ghuman	Music Waves/Kamlee Records LTD/Vanjhali Records
2011	Dilbar	Aman Hayer	Music Roots/Music Waves/Kamlee Records LTD
2008	Pao Bhangra (Only Folk)	Sukhpal Sukh	T-Series, Music Waves, Kamlee Records
2007	Nacho-Nacho	Sukhpal Sukh	T-Series
2005	Sone Di Chirhi	Sukhpal Sukh	T-Series
2003	Rang Rara Riri Rara	Sukhpal Sukh	T-Series
2001	Kurti	Atul Sharma	T-Series
2000	Chandigarh Shehar Di Kudi	Mohini & Dinesh	Raja Entertainers (Canada & India) Kamlee Records (UK)
1999	Ajj Khande Chon Kaum Sajni	Sukhpal Sukh	Raja Entertainers (Canada) Peritone (India) DMC Records (UK)
1998	Billo Teri Tor Vekh Ke	Sukhpal Sukh	Raja Entertainers (Canada & India)
1997	Mein Haan Putt Punjab Da	Sukhpal Sukh	Raja Entertainers (Canada & India) DMC Records (UK)
1996	Mela Vekhdiye Mutiyaare	Sukhpal Sukh	Raja Entertainers (Canada & India) Golden Star Video (Canada) DMC Records (UK)
1995	Khatta Doria	Kanwar Iqbal	Peritone (India) Golden Star Video (Canada)
1993	Yaar Nachde	Charanjit Ahuja & Varinder Bachan	TPM

=== Single songs ===
Release	Album	Record label	Notes
2016	Taare – Single	Kamlee Records LTD/T-Series	With Tru-Skool, Amrit Maan & From The Forthcoming Album "Indian Sardari"
2016	Gabhroo – Single	Kamlee Records LTD/T-Series	With Tigerstyle, Preet Kanwal & From The Forthcoming Album "Indian Sardari"
2015	The Game: Kabaddi 3 – Single	Shemaroo	With Beat Minister
2015	Sohni (The Real Punjaban) – Single	Saga Hits	With Beat Minister
2014	Ferrari – Single	Vanjhali Recordz	With Dr. Zeus & Raj Kakra
2011	The Gangsters	Speed Records	With K S Makhan, Gippy Grewal, Prince Ghuman, Raj Brar, Jassi Sohal
2003	Guldasta Geetan Da	T-Series	With K S Makhan, Surjit Bindrakhia, Nachhatar Gill, Hans Raj Hans, Balkar Sidhu, Harjit Harman
2003	Mela Geetan Da	T-Series	With Surjit Bindrakhia, Satwinder Bitti, Surinder Thandi
2002	Ral Khushian Manaiye	Kiss Records/Tips	With Jazzy B, Ranjit Mani, Virk Ranjit, Balkar Sidhu, Master Saleem, Happy and Preet Harpal.
2002	Boli Paa Mitra	T-Series	With Surjit Bindrakhia, Sardool Sikander, Satwinder Bitti, Amar Noorie, Yudhveer Manak
2002	Mitran Da Challa	T-Series	With Surjit Bindrakhia, Satwinder Bitti, Hans Raj Hans, Sabar Koti
2001	Jhumkeyan Wali	T-Series	With K S Makhan, Sardool Sikander, Satwinder Bitti, Feroz Khan
2001	Tik Tik Tik 2001	T-Series	With Sardool Sikander, Satwinder Bitti, Surinder Laddi
2001	Dhol-Vajda Vaisakhi Mela	T-Series	With Surjit Bindrakhia, Balkar Sidhu, Satwinder Bitti, Surinder Laddi, Yudhveer Manak
2000	Hello-Hello 2000	Music Waves	With Debi Makhsoospuri, Manmohan Waris, Sardool Sikander, Master Saleem, Amar Noorie
1997	Chharata 1997	T-Series	With Manmohan Waris, Sardool Sikander, Surinder Shinda, Hans Raj Hans, Ranjit Mani

== Film career ==
He started his Film career by appearing in the lead role in film Pind Di Kurhi in 2004, with Sheeba Bhakri and Veena Malik. He then appeared in Apni Boli Apna Des in 2009. He worked in film Punjab Bolda in 2013, starring with Anisha Pooja, Gurchet Chitrakar, B.N. Sharma, Binnu Dhillon, Karamjit Anmol, Amarjit Cheema. He also worked in Punjabi film named Haani with Harbhajan Mann, which was released in 2013. He also worked in a film named Ashke in 2018, starring with Amrinder Gill.

== Filmography ==
Release	Movie	Role	Record label	Movie Label	directed	Notes	Music
2005	Pind Di Kurhi	Lalli	T-Series	T-Series	1st Movie	Aman Hayer	
2009	Apni Boli Apna Des	Sahibdeep	Music Waves, Music Roots	Music Waves	September 2009	Aman Hayer	
2011	Welcome To Punjab	Sukhchain	Music Roots, Kamlee Records	Reel Time Entertainment	Delayed	Aman Hayer, Sukshinder Shinda, Anand Raj Anand, Saumya Tandon	
2013	Hanni	Jagir	Saga Music	Saga Music	With Harbhajan Mann	Jaidev Kumar	
2013	Punjab Bolda	Gurbaaz	Daddy Mohan Records	Pix-Ray Entertainment	With Anisha Pooja	Bhinda Aujla & Prince Ghuman	
2015	Disney Daaro		Speed Records	Speed Records	With Baljit Malwa	Tru-Skool & Kaos Productions	
2017	Yaar Annmulle 2				Batra Showbiz	Gurmeet Singh	
2018	Ashke	Vikram	Rhythm Boyz Entertainment		Amberdeep Singh		Jatinder Shah
2019	Muklawa		White Hill Studios		Simerjit Singh		
2019	Dulla Vaily	Jashan			Devi Sharma		
2024	Sucha Soorma						
