= Ravi Apnabeat =

English musician

Ravi Sethi, also known as Ravi Apnabeat, or DJ Ravi, is a DJ, dhol player and entertainer based in Manchester, England, and educated at William Hulme's Grammar School.

== Biography ==
Apnabeat has been active for 13 years and specialises in Bollywood, Bhangra and RnB. He has been prominent in the Asian club circuit.

Apnabeat performs at wedding receptions and special occasions, for the mainstream and also Asian events and mixed culture events.

Apnabeat worked previously as a music journalist for the Manchester Evening News and City Life.

Apnabeat is best known for his DJ residency at Satans Hollow night club, the longest running Asian / Bhangra night in England, Bollywood Seduction, which took place every Wednesday. In 2006, the night was ranked in the top 5 clubs nationwide by The Times. On 30 August 2017, the night celebrated its 15th year of continuous running. As of November 2017 the event became a monthly event and took place on the First Wednesday of Every month. The night ran until the government lockdown in March 2020.

In December 2011 Apnabeat launched a radio show on ALL FM. The show specialises in Asian / Bhangra music with interviews with celebrities from the music scene. Guests on the show have included Bhangra singers H-Dhami, Shin from DCS (Band), Panjabi Hit Squad, Dr Zeus, Panjabi MC, Bhinda Jatt, and Sukh the director of the Simply Bhangra website.

As of 2013 the show is aired out live on Alternate Tuesdays, 9pm- 11pm. Most of the previous radio shows can be accessed via links on the Apnabeat website.

Apnabeat won Asian Wedding DJ or Entertainer of the Year at an Asian Wedding Experience Awards ceremony held on 9 June 2013 at Renaissance, Manchester.

Apnabeat were finalists and nominated for the "Entertainer of the Year" award at the second annual Asian Wedding Experience Awards held on 8 December 2014.

In 2015, Apnabeat were shortlisted for the British Asian Wedding Awards for the Best Entertainment Company (North)

In 2016, Apnabeat were finalists for the third year in a row at the Asian Wedding Experience Awards, nominated in two separate categories, "Entertainer of the Year" and "Wedding DJ of the Year."

In 2017, Apnabeat were finalists for the fourth consecutive year at the Asian Wedding Experience Awards, again nominated in the category of "Entertainer of the Year" and "Wedding DJ of the Year".

2018, saw Apnabeat again nominated for the Asian Wedding Awards.

In 2019, Apnabeat started a monthly "Desi Saturday Night". This was suspended during lockdown but resumed after restrictions eased. "Desi Nights" was successful and events now takes place monthly or on special occasions in other cities too in addition to Manchester.

During 2021, Ravi Apnabeat appeared in the drama series Ackley Bridge, playing Dhol drums in season 4, episode 10.

In 2022, Apnabeat scooped two awards at Britain's Asian Wedding Awards, "Mandap Providers of the Year" and "Entertainers of the Year".
