= Angrej Ali =

- Born: Angrez Ali Khan
- Genres: Bhangra, Indi-pop
- Occupation: Singer
- Years active: 1995–present
- Labels: MovieBox, United Kingdom; Music Waves, Canada; StarMakers, India
- Website: www.angrejalionline.com

Angrej Ali (born Angrez Ali Khan) is a Punjabi record producer, musician and singer-songwriter. His 2008 album, Ik Din, was produced by Aman Hayer. His 5 Duo Collaboration with Aman Hayer & Jeeti are Groundshaker in 2005, Groundshaker 2 in 2008, Pure Platinum in 2010, Jukebox in 2010 & The Entourage in 2011.

Angrej Ali performed at the annual Mehfil Mela Festival on 3 September 2006, in Brampton, and was among those artists honored at the commemoration festivity marking the 109th birthday of late Justice Gurnam Singh in February 2008.

== Singles ==
| Year | Song | Label | Notes |
|---|---|---|---|
| 2012 | "The Folk King" (Tribute To Kuldip Manak) | MovieBox Record | Music By Aman Hayer Along with A.S. Kang, Jazzy B, Sukshinder Shinda, Malkit Singh, Manmohan Waris Balwinder Safri & Angrej Ali |

== Discography ==
| Release | Album | Record label | Music |
|---|---|---|---|
| 2017 | Heer – Single | White Hill Music | Aman Hayer |
| 2016 | Lalkaare (Feat: Fateh Doe & Shortie) | Saga Hits | Dr Zeus |
| 2016 | Parindey – Single | Speed Records | Beat Minister |
| 2015 | Tere Bina – Single | Lokhdun Punjabi | Pav Dharia |
| 2015 | Nazara – Single | VIP Records | Jags Klimax |
| 2014 | Daang Te Dera – Single | MovieBox | Aman Hayer |
| 2014 | Pabla Tribute – Single | MovieBox | Kaos Productions |
| 2014 | Jatt Di Akh – Single | Elite Music (UK)/Speed Records | Aman Hayer |
| 2012 | Diamond Ring | MovieBox/Elite Music | Aman Hayer |
| 2012 | Ajja Ajja – Single | MovieBox | Aman Hayer |
| 2011 | The Entourage (1 Song: Sardari with Dev Dhillon) | MovieBox/Speed Records | Aman Hayer |
| 2010 | Jukebox (1 Song: Ban Ke Sahiban) | MovieBox | Jeeti |
| 2010 | Pure Platinum (1 Song: Tu Hogayi Mutiyar) | MovieBox/T-Series | Aman Hayer |
| 2008 | Ik Din | MovieBox/Planet Recordz/Speed Records | Aman Hayer |
| 2008 | Groundshaker 2 (1 Song: Je Naal Nachunga) | MovieBox/Planet Recordz/Speed Records | Aman Hayer |
| 2005 | Groundshaker (1 Song: Tharti Hilde) | MovieBox/T-Series | Aman Hayer |
| 2004 | Munda Shaunkee | Catrack | Kiss 'N' Tell |
| 2001 | Husan Wale | Silver Streak Records | Gurmeet Singh |
| 1999 | Photo | MovieBox | Ravi Bal |
| 1997 | Agg Vich Sohniye Nu | MovieBox | Atul Sharma |
| 1995 | Holi Di Zamana | MovieBox | Charanjit Ahuja & Atul Sharma |

== Filmography ==
| Year | Film | Role | Notes | Movie Label | Soundtrack Label | Music |
|---|---|---|---|---|---|---|
| 2014 | Aqous Of Punjab | Jass | With Saini Surinder | Speed Records | Speed Records | Tru-Skool |
| 2014 | iPhone Mann | TBA | With Nachhatar Gill & Mandy Takhar | T-Series | T-Series | Gurmeet Singh |
| Unreleased | Jatt Romantic | Himself | Guest Appearance | Speed Records | Speed Records | Bhinda Aujla & Aman Hayer |
| Unreleased | Hikk Naal | Jagjit | With Amrinder Gill and Mahie Gill | Speed Records | Speed Records | Tru-Skool |
