= Lehmber Hussainpuri =

Indian Bhangra singer (born 1977)

- Born: 17 July 1977 (age 49)
- Origin: Hussainpur, Punjab, India
- Genres: Bhangra, Punjabi hip hop
- Years active: 2001–present
- Labels: Envy Entertainment (2002–2005); Serious Records (2005–2014); LH Records (2014–present)

Lehmber Hussainpuri (pronounced [lǽmbər husɛːnpuri]; born 17 July 1977) is an Indian Bhangra singer.

== Life ==
Lehmber Hussainpuri was born on 17 July 1977.

He now resides in Deol Nagar Jalandhar City.

On 31 May 2021, Lehmber was accused of assaulting his wife and kids. These allegations were later dropped with the explanation that Lehmber's wife's sister, Moghi Kapurthalawali, had been creating fights in his family. An organization called the Punjab Women's Commission helped reconcile Lehmber with his family while removing Moghi Kapurthalawali from their home in Deol Nagar.

== Discography ==
=== Official albums ===
Year	Name	Record label	Producer(s)
2005	Folk Attack	Baseline Records	Dr. Zeus
2006	Chalakiyan	Serious Records	Aman Hayer, Jeeti & Kam Frantic
2011	Folk Attack 2	Serious Records	Jeeti, Kam Frantic, PBN; Bhinda Aujla, & Sukhi Chand

=== Singles ===
Year	Song name	Producer	Label
2005	Sachiyan Suniyan	Dr. Zeus	Baseline Records
2005	Je Jatt	Dr. Zeus	Baseline Records
2006	Chalakiyan	Kam Frantic	Serious Records
2006	Manke	Aman Hayer	Serious Records
2011	Jatt Pagal Karte	Jeeti	Serious Records
2011	Pulli Phirdi	Kam Frantic	Serious Records
2015	Bhangra Pauna	Bally Gill	E3UK Records
2015	Aaj Kujh Wandna Pau	Bhinda Aujla	LH Records
2016	Ui Ui	Jeeti	LH Records
2016	Nachdi Club'Ch	Jugraj Rainkh	E3UK Records
2017	Phone Mera	Jeeti	Venus-Whitehill Music
2018	Ban Gai Aa Jodi	Sunil Kalyan	Anita Sandhu Records
2019	Feeling Phullan Wale Suit Di	Jassi Bros	T-Series Apna Punjab
2020	Manke 2	Johnny	Whitehill Music
2020	Beat Crazy	Jus Keys	WallStreet Studios
2021	Sach V/S Jhooth	Mr. Beat	LH Records
2021	Tere Ton Sohni	Mister Baaz	Hotshot Music
2022	Aaja Jee Aai Nu (feat. Arya Rajni Jain)	Lalli Dhaliwal	LH Records
2023	Jatt Da Fikar Mukeya	Sunil Kalyan	LH Records
2023	Jhatka	PS Kahlon	LH Records
2023	Sadi Gali 2.0 (feat. Shipra Goyal)	DJ Shadow Dubai	T-Series
2024	Boliyan Non-Stop (feat. Arya Rajni Jain)	Sunil Kalyan	LH Records

=== Compilations, religious albums, and foreign releases ===
Year	Name	Record label
2005	Strictly Vocals	Speed Records
2005	The Best of Lehmber Hussainpuri	Jatt Records
2006	The Great Bhangra King	VPearl Records
2006	Folk Magic	VPearl Records
2006	Daaru Pee Ke	VPearl Records
2006	DJ Attack Vol. 1	VPearl Records
2006	Lehmber the Remix Album	Punjab2000 Records
2007	21st Century King of Bhangra	ENVY Entertainment (UK)
2007	DJ Attack Vol. 2	VPearl Records
2007	The Don	HOM Records
2007	Party with Lehmber Hussainpuri	HOM Records
2007	Phuchal	Speed Records
2007	Bhuchal	Planet Records
2009	DJ Attack 3:Pehchan Punjabi De	VPearl Records
2009	Chal Chaliye Maiyea De (Religious Album)	T-Series
2010	First Impression (3CD)	Speed Records
2010	Ho Rahi E Jee Teri Jai Jai Kaar (Religious Album)	Shemaroo Entertainment
2011	Best of Lehmber Hussainpuri	VIP Records (UK)
2011	Made In England (2CD)	Speed Records
2013	The Best of Lehmber Hussainpuri	MovieBox Records (UK)
2014	Dhan Dhan Guru Ravidass (Religious Album)	Amar Audio
2018	Prabhu Valmiki JI (Religious Album)	Shinestar International

=== Film soundtracks ===
Year	Movie	Music director	Song
2011	Tanu Weds Manu	RDB (Rhythm Dhol Bass)	Sadi Gali
2011	F.A.L.T.U.	Sachin-Jiger	Bhoot Aya
2011	Mausam (2011 film)	Pritam	Mallo Malli
2011	Yaar Annmulle	Gurmeet Singh	Tera Ishq Soniye
2012	Sirphire	Jatinder Singh-Shah	Phuchal
2012	Yaraan Naal Baharaan 2	Jaidev Kumar	Yaraan Naal Baharaan
2012	Burrraahh	Gurmeet Singh	Ek Vaari Jeena (w/ Nachhatar Gill); Bhangra Boliyan (w/ Pappi Gill & Master Saleem)
2012	Power Cut	Gurmeet Singh	Ghutt Charh Kay
2012	Yamley Jatt Yamley	Jassi Katyal	Speaker
2013	Saadi Love Story	Jaidev Kumar	Dhol Special (w/ Manak-E)
2013	Sadda Haq (film)	Jatinder Shah	Dabb Di Killi
2013	Punjab Bolda	Prince Ghuman	Ankhi Putt (w/ Sarbjit Cheema)
2013	Sikander	Gurmeet Singh	Hootar (w/ Labh Janjua)
2013	Aashiqui Not Allowed	Gurmeet Singh	Free Mind; Free Mind Remix
2013	RSVP (Ronde Saare Vyah Picho)	Gurmeet Singh	Aibo
2013	Heer & Hero	Gurmeet Singh	Heer Te Hero
2014	Fateh	Tigerstyle	Hai Shava
2014	iPhone Mann	Gurmeet Singh	Goli
2015	The Mastermind - Jinda Sukha	Tigerstyle	Jinda Sukha Anthem (w/ Ranjit Bawa)
2016	Darra	Kuljit Singh	Tappe (w/ Harinder Hundal)
2017	Mahi NRI	Arjun Harjai	Tabbar (w/ Hardy Sandu)
2017	Thug Life	Bhinda Aujla	Boliyan (w/ Bhinda Aujla)
2020	Jaan Toh Pyara	Tonn-E	Viah (w/ Inderjit Nikku)
2023	Bina Band Chal England	Sukhbir Randhawa	Bina Band Chal England
