= Collaborations 3 =

Studio album by Sukshinder Shinda
- Released: 5 December 2014
- Genre: Punjabi, Romantic, Bhangra

Sukshinder Shinda chronology
Rock Da Party (2012)	Collaborations 3 (2014)

Collaborations 3 is album in the series of Collaborations albums by Sukshinder Shinda. Featured in this album are Jazzy B, Diljit Dosanjh, Kamal Khan, Shazia Manzoor, Surinder Shinda, Richa Sharma, Abrar-Ul-Haq and Don Revo. The Album is on MovieBox (UK) Music Waves (Canada) and T-Series (India).

== Track listing ==
All music is composed by Sukshinder Shinda

No.	Title	Length
1.	"Yaara Dildara" (With Shazia Manzoor)	4:20
2.	"Singh Naal Jodi" (With Diljit Dosanjh)	4:11
3.	"Ni Jehra Tere Vich Bolda" (With Jazzy B)	4:00
4.	"Ithe Rakh" (With Abrar-Ul-Haq)	4:02
5.	"Akhiyan Di Akhiya Ruburoo" (With Kamal Khan)	6:10
6.	"Shear" (With Surinder Shinda)	1:26
7.	"Jeyonde Rehan Truckan Wale" (With Surinder Shinda)	3:57
8.	"Aashiq Ban Baitha" (With Richa Sharma)	4:38
9.	"Ni Tu Lakhan Wichon Ik" (With Don Revo)	3:57

== PTC Punjabi Music Awards 2015 ==
Won

- Best Non Resident Punjabi Album
