= Harbhajan Mann =

Indian-Canadian singer and actor (born 1965)

Background information
- Born: Harbhajan Singh Mann; Khemuana, Punjab, India
- Genres: Punjabi folk Bhangra
- Occupations: Singer, actor, film producer
- Years active: 1987–present
- Website: www.harbhajanmann.com

Harbhajan Singh Mann is an Indian-Canadian singer, actor and film producer associated with Punjabi music and cinema. His movies include Jee Aayan Nu (2002), Asa Nu Maan Watna Da (2004), Heer Ranjha (2009) and Jag Jeondeyan De Mele (2009). Mann is widely considered a legendary Punjabi Artist due to his variety of folk songs and culturally rooted films.

== Early life and career ==
Mann was born in the Khemuana village, located in the Bathinda district of Punjab, India. He is of Sikh origin. Mann began singing as an amateur in 1980, and performed in local shows for the South Asian community while attending high school in Canada. His beginnings as a professional artist can be traced to 1992, while he was in Punjab. Mann realized that the market for Punjabi music in Canada was small, and he returned to Punjab to record his albums.

Mann had a breakthrough in 1999, when India MTV and T-Series provided exposure for his Oye Hoye album. His was a Punjabi-pop style and he soon undertook playback singing roles.

The playback work led to acting roles and Mann has become a prominent figure in the revitalisation of Punjabi cinema. He has starred and produced in seven movies – Ji Aayan Nu, Asa Nu Mann Watna Da, Dil Apna Punjabi, Mitti Wajaan Mardi, Mera Pind-My home, Jag Jeondiyan De Mele and his most recent movie, Heer Ranjha.

On 2 January 2013, he released Satrangi Peengh 2, in collaboration with his brother, Gursewak Mann. Harbhajan Mann said that he wants to create music that will live for decades.

In 2013, Mann acted in Hanni, which was directed by Amitoj Maan. The two collaborated again in Gaddar – The Traitor, which was released on 29 May 2015.

Harbhajan Mann released his single "Delhi '84" in 2014, for which the music has been given by Sukshinder Shinda.

== Discography ==
Year	Album	Record label	Composed
2017	Satrangi Peengh 3	HM Records	Gurmeet Singh/Tigerstyle
2012	Satrangi Peengh 2	T-Series	Jaidev Kumar
2010	Vaari Vaari	T-Series	Jaidev Kumar
2008	Sohniye	T-Series	Sukshinder Shinda
2008	Nazran Miliyan	Think Big Entertainment	Sukshinder Shinda
2007	Mauj Mastiyan	Think Big Entertainment	Surinder Bachan
2005	Dil Dol Gaya	MovieBox	Jaidev Kumar
2003	Satrangi Peengh (With Gursewak Mann)	T-Series	Jaidev Kumar
2001	Haaye Meri Billo	T-Series	Jaidev Kumar
2001	Nachlai	T-Series	Jaidev Kumar
2000	Lala Lala Lala	T-Series	Jaidev Kumar
1999	Oye-Hoye	T-Series	Jaidev Kumar
1996	Vadhaiyan Jee Vadhaiyan	Tips	Charanjit Ahuja
1994	Jag Jeondeyan De Mele	Saga	Charanjit Ahuja
1992	Chithiye Ne Chithiye	Music Bank	Charanjit Ahuja
1990	Gidha Punjabna Da	T-Series	Charanjit Ahuja
1989	Kahda Lambardar Ve	The Video Shop Vancouver	Varinder Bachan
1988	Ishq De Mamle	His Master's Voice	Gopal Khanna

=== Religious ===
Year	Album	Record label	Notes	Composed
2017	Sirhind Di Diwaar	Mad 4 Music	Harbhajan Maan	sukhpal Sukh
1999	Amrit Da Batta	T-Series	With Gursewak Mann	Jaidev Kumar
1997	Raj Karega Khalsa	Sur sangam	With Gursewak Mann	Charanjit Ahuja
1995	Panth Tere Diyan Goojan	Saga	With Gursewak Mann	Charanjit Ahuja

== Guest appearances ==
Release	Album	Record label
2018	Kangan - Single (Music: Jatinder Shah)	T-Series
2016	Sher – Single (Music: Tigerstyle)	T-Series
2016	Ikk Ikk Saah – Single (Music: Tigerstyle)	Saga Hits
2015	Sardari – Single (Music: Desi Crew)	MovieBox/Bunty Bains Productions
2015	Husn : The Kali – Single (Music: Tigerstyle)	Amar Audio
2014	Full Charchey (PTC Star Night) (Music: Desi Crew)	PTC Motion Pictures
2014	Gurbani – Single (Music: Gurmeet Singh)	Dharam Seva Records
2014	Rumaal (Duo Collaboration/Aah Chak 2014)	Swag Music
2013	Wajjde Wajje – Single (Music: Sukhpal Sukh)	Saga Hits
2013	Wall Of Sirhind – Single (Music: Sukhpal Sukh)	Dharam Seva Records
2012	Hik Naal (With Late Surjit Bindrakhia, Avtar Maniac, Varinder Brar & Geeta Zaildar)	Think Big Entertainment/Goyal Music
2009	Bas Kar Bas Kar (With Aman Hayer, Labh Janjua and Gurdas Mann)	Think Big Entertainment
2006	Nerre Nerre (With Meshi Eshara)	Tips
2004	Ik Kudi Punjab Di (With Rahat Fateh Ali Khan)	Kamlee Records
2002	Ho Janna (With Diljit Dosanjh and Gippy Grewal)	Tips
1997	Maar Sutya (With Sardool Sikander and Hans Raj Hans)	Saga
1991	Jatt UK (With Manjit Pappu)	T-Series/Music Bank
1988	Satguru Parsad (Duo Collaboration with Malkit Singh)	His Master's Voice
1987	Jogi Tera Majboori (With Gurdas Mann)	T-Series

== Filmography ==
Year	Film	Singer	Actor	Producer	Notes
2002	Jee Aayan Nu	Yes	Yes		Debut as an Actor
2004	Asa Nu Maan Watna Da	Yes	Yes		
2006	Dil Apna Punjabi	Yes	Yes		
2007	Mitti Wajaan Maardi	Yes	Yes		
2008	Mera Pind-My home	Yes	Yes		
2009	Jag Jeondeyan De Mele	Yes	Yes	Yes	Debut as a Producer
2009	Heer Ranjha	Yes	Yes	Yes	Music: Gurmeet Singh
2011	Yaara o Dildaara	Yes	Yes		T-Series Film
2013	Haani	Yes	Yes	Yes	
2015	Gaddar : The Traitor	Yes	Yes		
2016	Saadey CM Saab	Yes	Yes		
2022	PR	Yes	Yes	Yes	
2026	Eh Din Roz Ni Aune	Yes	Yes	Yes	
