= Satrangi Peengh 3 =

Studio album by Harbhajan Mann & Gursewak Mann
- Released: 2017
- Genre: Punjabi
- Label: HM Records

Harbhajan Mann & Gursewak Mann chronology
Satrangi Peengh 2 (2012)	Satrangi Peengh 3 (2017)

Satrangi Peengh 3 is a studio album by Harbhajan Mann and Gursewak Mann released on 27 September 2017.

== Track listing ==
No.	Title	Length
1.	"Jindderiye"	5:49
2.	"Reshmi Lehnge"	3:47
3.	"Kach Da Khilona"	5:20
4.	"Neewein Neewein Jhonpde"	4:32
5.	"Boota Mehndi Da"	3:59
6.	"Maa"	5:55
7.	"Dard 47 Da"	4:32
8.	"Parchhawein"	4:02
Total length:		36:36
