= Malkit Singh =

Malkit Singh MBE
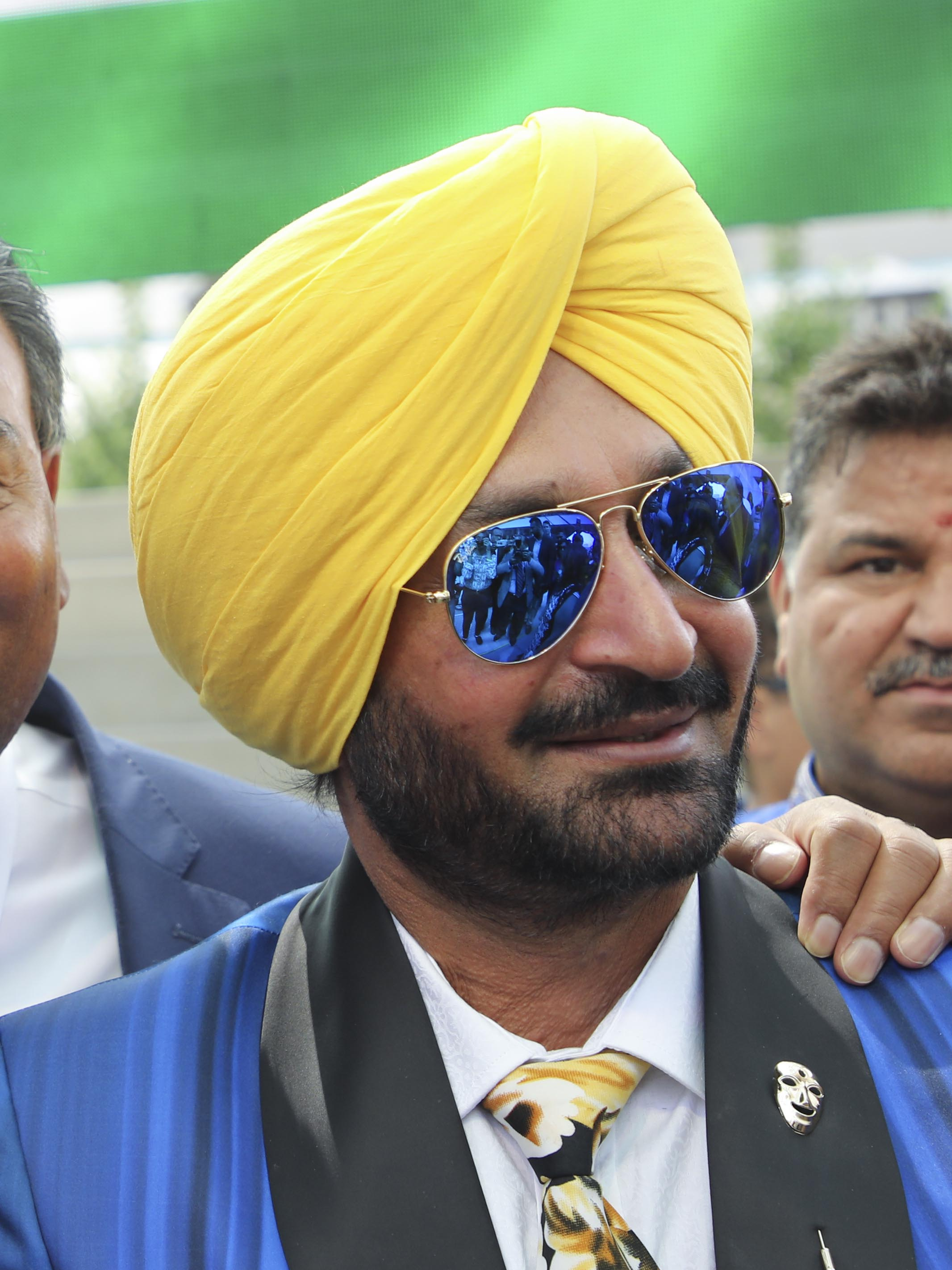
- Malkit Singh

Background information
- Born: Malkit Singh Boparai c. 1963; Hussainpur, Punjab, India
- Origin: Birmingham, England
- Genres: Bhangra, Indi-pop
- Occupation: Singer-songwriter
- Instrument: Vocals
- Years active: 1986
- Label: Oriental Star Agencies
- Website: MalkitSingh.com

Malkit Singh, MBE (Punjabi: ਮਲਕੀਤ ਸਿੰਘ) (Malkit Singh Boparai; born c. 1963) is an England-based Punjabi bhangra singer. Born in Hussainpur and raised in Nakodar, he moved to Birmingham in 1984. Singh was the first Punjabi singer to be honoured with an MBE by Queen Elizabeth II at Buckingham Palace. He is most famous for the songs "Gur Nalo Ishq Mitha", "Tootak Tootak Tootiyan", "Kurri Garam Jayee", "Dekh li vilyait", "Chal Hun", and "Jind Mahi", the latter two from the soundtrack to the popular film Bend It Like Beckham.

== Career ==
Malkit Singh had appeared on many Indian talk shows which were linked to Sikhism and Punjab on MTV Channel, Channel V, and all Indian channels. He was listed by the Guinness Book of Records as the biggest selling bhangra solo artist of all time, with sales of over 4.9 million records in his 32-year career. His song "Tutak Tutak Toothiyan" written by Veer Rahimpuri was the fastest-selling and most successful Bhangra single at the time. It was released with the 1990 album Tootak Tootak Toothian, which sold 2.5 million records, a record for Bhangra Indi-pop at the time.

== Awards and recognition ==
- In 2005, Singh was awarded the "Commitment to Scene" award at the UK Asian Music Awards.
- In 2008, Malkit Singh was appointed Member of the Order of the British Empire (MBE) in the 2008 New Year Honours.
- In 2010, Singh was awarded "Outstanding Achievement" award at the Brit Asia TV Music Awards.
- In 2012, Singh was honoured with a star on the Birmingham Walk of Stars.

== Discography ==
=== Singles ===
Year	Album	Label
2022	Kali Ainak	Music Waves Productions Ltd
2017	Midas Touch 3	MovieBox/Saga Hits
2014	Sikh Hon Da Maan	MovieBox/T-Series
2009	Billo Rani	MovieBox
2005	21st Chapter	OSA
2003	Midas Touch 2	Music Waves
2002	Paaro	OSA
2001	Mighty Boliyan	OSA
2000	Nach Nach	OSA
1999	Millennium Mixes	OSA
1997	Agg Larr Gaayee	OSA
1995	Forever Gold	T-Series
1994	Midas Touch	OSA
1993	Tootak Tootak Toothian	
1993	Chak Deh Dholia	OSA
1992	Singho Ho Jo Kathe	Saga
1992	Tere Ishq Nachiyav	Saga
1991	Gal Sunja	Saga
1991	Ragga Muffin Mix	OSA
1990	Dhotakada Bai Dhotakada	OSA
1989	Hai Shava	T-Series
1989	Fast Forward	T-Series
1988	Up Front	HMV
1988	Chott Nigary Lawo	HMV
1988	Putt Sardara De	Saga
1987	I Love Golden Star	T-Series
1986	Nach Giddhe Vich	HMV

=== Film ===
- Love in Vietnam (2025)

=== Duo collaboration ===
Year	Album	Label	Notes
2016	Chardi Kala	MovieBox/Saga Hits	Music By: Sukshinder Shinda / Midas Touch 3
2016	Ranjha	MovieBox/Saga Hits	Music By: Gurmeet Singh / Midas Touch 3
2016	Maa Da Pyaar	MovieBox/Saga Hits	Music By: Atul Sharma / Midas Touch 3
2016	Selfie Boliyan	MovieBox/Saga Hits	Music By: DJ Vix / Midas Touch 3
2016	Desi Peeke	MovieBox/Saga Hits	Music By: Nick Dhammu / Midas Touch 3
2016	Yaari Jattan Di	MovieBox/Saga Hits	Music By: Nick Dhammu / Midas Touch 3
2014	iPhone Mann	T-Series	Special Appearance Sung: Jatt Di Matian
2013	Desi Beat	Kamlee Records	Music By DJ Vix / Taken From The Forthcoming Album "Chapter V"
2012	The Folk King (Tribute To Kuldip Manak)	MovieBox Record	Music By Aman Hayer Along with A.S. Kang, Jazzy B, Sukshinder Shinda, Malkit Singh, Manmohan Waris Balwinder Safri & Angrej Ali
2011	International Villager	MovieBox, Speed Records, Planet Recordz	(Beautiful)
2008	The New Adventures of Jassi Sidhu	Moviebox/Music Waves	Ki Kehne

== See also ==
- List of British Sikhs
