= Pind Di Kurhi (2005 film) =

- Directed by: Sukhwant Dhadda
- Written by: Bashir Niaz
- Produced by: Gurmail Singh Dhami; Iqbal Dhillon
- Starring: Sarbjit Cheema; Veena Malik; Sheeba Bhakri; Gurpreet Ghuggi; Tariq Javed; Ashraf Rahi; Sudesh Lehri; Bhotu Shah; Sheeba Butt
- Cinematography: Mangesh Sawant
- Music by: Aman Hayer; Sardool Sikander
- Release date: 11 February 2005
- Running time: 125 minutes
- Country: India
- Language: Punjabi

Pind Di Kurhi, also spelled as Pind Di Kudi and Pind Di Kuri, is a 2005 Punjabi romance, comedy and drama film directed by Sukhwant Dhadda, starring Sarbjit Cheema, Sheeba Bhakri and Veena Malik in lead roles.
