= Jag Jeondeyan De Mele =

2009 film by Baljit Singh Deo

- Directed by: Baljit Singh Deo
- Written by: Baldev Gill
- Produced by: Music Waves; H&H Productions
- Starring: Puneet Issar, Harbhajan Mann, Tulip Joshi, Gurpreet Ghuggi, Sunita Dhir
- Cinematography: Jay Vincent
- Edited by: Baljit Singh Deo
- Music by: Sandesh Shandilya, Aman Hayer, Atul Sharma
- Release date: 20 February 2009
- Country: India
- Language: Punjabi

Jag Jeondeyan De Mele is a 2009 Punjabi film, directed by Baljit Singh Deo and produced by Harbhajan Mann, Kulwinder Sanghera, Baljinder Sanghera, Gulzar Inder Chahal, and Surinder Sanghera. It was released in India on 20 February 2009. The title is based on an old Punjabi phrase, which literally means- "when you are alive, life's a carnival" (in the movie, it differs due to the change in context, where it is deciphered as- "You meet until you are alive").

Harbhakan Mann and Tulip Joshi star as lovers from different social castes, with Joshi making her Punjabi film debut.

== Plot ==
Abijot and Mitro become friends as children. Abijot hails from a rich, high class family while Mitro belongs to a poor, low class family. The two families do not like them playing and spending time with each other so Abijot's family sends him and his cousin Roop to Chandigarh where they both can do their studies away from Mitro and her low-cast family.

Fifteen years later, Abijot and Roop come back. Abijot meets Mitro and they really want to marry each other, but their family differences come in the way and those differences do not allow their union. Mitro's family decides to marry her off to someone else, but on the day of her wedding she consumes poison and runs to Abijot. She tells Abijot that she is leaving and will meet him again in this birth before dying.

Abijot gets depressed so he decides to leave India and come to Canada, where his mind will be kept off of Mitro. Abijot stays at his mama's (uncle – i.e. mother's brother) house but his cousin Terry, is jealous of Abijot receiving attention and wants him to leave. So Abijot moves into Lucky's house, his childhood friend who is married to a black woman. Roop calls Abijot and says that he will come to Canada soon. One day Abijot and Lucky go to a coffee shop and Abijot sees exactly the same double of Mitro, named Ekam but it turns out she is blind.

Abijot's mama feels bad for Abijot so he buys Abijot an apartment.

Abijot comforts Ekam and, they both fall in love. Abijot asks her what her dream is and she says it's to see this world again. Abijot calls his parents in India, he lies and tells them he needs money to buy a house. Abijot's mama receives the money and gives it to Abijot and is pleased Abijot will have a house to live in. Instead of buying a house he pays for Ekam's surgery with the money which is successful. When it's time for Ekam to take the bandage off her eyes Abijot is not there. Ekam refuses to take off the bandage because she wants to see Abijot's face first. The doctor ultimately takes off Ekam's bandage because he has another patient to take care of. Abijot rushes but a man, named Iqbal who is Ekam's fiancé gets there before him. Ekam and her family thought he left her because she was blind but, it turns out he left because his father got murdered and, the police arrested and jailed him for few years. Abijot sadly leaves them both.

After the operation is declared successful, Ekam is unhappy at seeing Iqbal because she loves Abijot. Abijot's father gets sick so Abijot leaves for India, and Roop comes to Canada. Abijot's father says that all he wants is to see him married, so Abijot agrees. Ekam's father tells her she can marry whoever she wants, and Ekam decides on Abijot so she goes to meet him to see if he wants to marry her. Ekam rushes to Abijot's apartment, but she finds Roop there. After seeing Ekam, Roop calls her Mitro. Ekam remembers Abijot said that he will call her by Mitro instead of Ekam. Then she sees pictures of a girl who looks exactly like her and remembers that Abijot told her he met 2 girls that are not related but look exactly the same. Ekam is confused so she asks who is Mitro and where is Abijot? Roop says Mitro is Abijot's love, and that Abijot went to India. Ekam misunderstands and thinks Abijot did a favor on her and went back for Mitro. Roop says Mitro died a year ago and that he went back to meet his sick father. Ekam is shocked.

Abijot's engagement preparations are being made until Roop brings Ekam up. Everyone is shocked and cannot believe this is Mitro because she died. Abijot tells them that this is Ekam, and he also tells them that before dying, Mitro said she will meet him again in this birth and here she is. The two families finally realize that two lovers can never be separated and consent to their union. Abijot and Ekam live happily ever after.

== Cast ==
- Harbhajan Mann ... Abhijot
- Tulip Joshi ... Mitro / Ekam
- Gurpreet Ghuggi ... Lucky
- Puneet Issar
- Sunita Dhir ... Shabbo
- Gulzar Inder Chahal ... Roop
- Shivender Mahal
- Neeta Mohindra
- Roshni Singh
- Jag Mangat
- B.B Verma
- Harpreet Hanjra
- Baljit Singh Zukhmi
- Gurpreet Grewal

== Music ==
- "Payar" – Harbhajan Mann ft. Shreya Ghoshal
- "Ishqe De Rog" – Harbhajan Mann
- "Jag Jeondeyan De Mele" - Rahat Fateh Ali Khan
- "Tur Gaye Ne Jani" – Harbhajan Mann
- "Rang Rangia" – Sukhwinder Singh
- "Mele Mitran De" – Harbhajan Mann – Music: Aman Hayer
- "Gustakh Akhan" – Harbhajan Mann and Sonu Kakkar
- "Jee Nai Lagda" – Harbhajan Mann – Music: Aman Hayer
