= Collaborations 2 =

Studio album by Sukshinder Shinda
- Released: 26 February 2009
- Genre: Punjabi, Romantic, Bhangra
- Length: 44:50

Sukshinder Shinda chronology
Living the Dream (2007)	Collaborations 2 (2009)	Satguru Mera

Singles from Collaborations 2
- 1. "Ghum Shum Ghum Shum"; 2. "Yaarian Banai Rakhi Yaarian"

Collaborations 2 is the tenth studio album by Punjabi singer Sukshinder Shinda, released worldwide on 26 February 2009, and his second collaborative album. The album was also released internationally to USA, Canada, and U.K.

The album was preceded by the lead single, Ghum Shum Ghum Shum which featured Rahat Fateh Ali Khan. The song was also Shinda's first with Rahat. Following the success of his first single, Yarrian Banai Rakhi Yaarian featuring Jazzy B, was released which was another success. Despite success with two singles from the album, the album received positive reviews.

== Track listing ==
Indian Edition
No.	Title	Length
1.	"Ghum Shum Ghum Shum ft. Rahat Fateh Ali Khan"	4:39
2.	"Yaarian Banai Rakhi Yaarian ft. Jazzy B"	6:23
3.	"Shinda Around The World ft. Don Revo"	6:06
4.	"Mul Na Lagda ft. Nachhatar Gill"	6:27
5.	"Apni Bana Ley ft. Shazia Manzoor"	3:36
6.	"Parande Sat Rang Deh ft. Manjeet Pappu"	5:15
7.	"Nachde O Mundeyo ft. Labh Janjua"	6:07
8.	"Tu Hi Tu - Tu Hi Tu ft. Amrinder Gill"	6:16
