= Vaari Vaari =

Album by Harbhajan Mann

Studio album by Harbhajan Mann
- Released: 15 September 2010
- Genres: Punjabi, Pop
- Length: 34 Minutes
- Label: T-Series
- Producer: Jaidev Kumar

Harbhajan Mann chronology
Nazaran Miliyan (2008)	Vaari Vaari (2010)	Satrangi Peengh 2 (2012)

Vaari Vaari is the studio album by Harbhajan Mann released on 15 September 2010.

== Awards ==
The album won the following award at the 2011 PTC Punjabi Music Awards:

- Best Pop Vocalist (Male) for Harbhajan Mann (Vaari Vaari)

== Track listing ==
All music composed by Jaidev Kumar and lyrics was given by Babu Singh Maan.

Vaari Vaari
No.	Title	Length
1.	"Vaari Varri ft. Sumitra Iyer"	4:33
2.	"Call Jalandharon Aayi"	4:33
3.	"Maa Di Boli Aan"	5:16
4.	"Naa Jaa Sohneya Sajna"	5:46
5.	"Raateen Peeni"	4:02
6.	"Rang Tamashe"	4:19
7.	"Pooran Putt Pardesi"	6:05
8.	"Dilbaariyaan"	6:09
9.	"Nach Nee ft. Sumitra Iyer"	4:27
Total length:		34:37
