= Shaheed Udham Singh (film) =

1999 Indian film directed by Chitraarth

Shaheed Uddham Singh
- Directed by: Chitraarth
- Based on: Life of Udham Singh
- Starring: Raj Babbar; Gurdas Maan; Amrish Puri; Barry John
- Release date: 24 December 1999
- Country: India
- Language: Punjabi

Shaheed Uddham Singh is a 1999 Indian Punjabi-language biographical film based on the life of Udham Singh, an Indian revolutionary who had witnessed the 1919 Amritsar massacre and wanted to avenge the mass killing of his countrymen. He was desperate to punish Michael O'Dwyer, the Lieutenant Governor of the Punjab for his involvement with the massacre. The film was theatrically released in India on 24 December 1999, just two days before Singh's birth centenary. The film was screened retrospective on 13 August 2016 at the Independence Day Film Festival jointly presented by the Indian Directorate of Film Festivals and Ministry of Defense, commemorating 70th Indian Independence Day.

== Summary ==
Udham Singh Kamboj was born and brought up in a Sikh family in Punjab, British India. Enraged over Jallianwala Bagh massacre that took place in Amritsar in April 1919 during the day of Baisakhi festival, Singh swears vengeance. He sets about creating obstacles for the British colonial government, and is soon on wanted lists by the authorities. On one occasion he is shielded by a courtesan, Noor Jehan. In order to achieve his vengeance, he travels to the United Kingdom, befriends some local Indians, as well as Irish nationalist Irene Rose Palmer. He kills Michael O'Dwyer, the Lieutenant Governor of Punjab, who in 1919, who had authorised Dyer's use of force, during a program at Caxton Hall in London. He is quickly apprehended, and jailed. He refuses to cooperate with the authorities, nor is he willing to accept that he is mentally incapable. During his trial, he is offered the opportunity to state his case for acquittal but his remarks were deemed incendiary by the judge, who forbade the press from publishing them. He was hanged on 31 July 1940 at Pentonville Prison in north London.

== Cast ==
- Raj Babbar as Sardar Udham Singh Kamboj
- Gurdas Maan as Bhagat Singh
- Harsharan Singh as Sukhdev Thapar
- Shatrughan Sinha as Muhammad Khan
- Amrish Puri as The Sufi Saint
- Juhi Chawla as Noor Jehan
- Ranjeet as Giani Ji
- Tom Alter as Brig. Gen. Edward Harry Dyer
- Joseph Lamb as Lord of Adm. Winston Churchill
- Dave Anderson as Michael O'Dwyer
- Barry John as Lord Keeper Clement Attlee
- Barry John as Michael Atlee
- David McLennan as Neville Chamberlain
- Charleen Carswell as Irene Rose Palmer
- Chetana Das as Udham Singh's mother
- Raman Dhillon as Udham Singh's aunt
- Kimi Verma as Meeto

== Music ==
The film's music was composed by Jagjit Singh and Sukhshinder Shinda.

- Song - "Zaat" sung by Durga Rangila
- Song - “Ishq Di Baazi” sung by Gurdas Mann
- Song - “Mujrah - Allah Kare Din Na Chadhe” and “Raatan” sung by Jaspinder Narula
- Song - “Udham Singh” sung by Jazzy B
- Song - “Udham Singh” sung by Manjit Pappu
- Song - “Shabad Gurbani” and “Sassi” sung by Jagjit Singh
- Song - “Boli Khich ke”
