= Dulla Vaily =

2018 Indian Punjabi film

- Film poster
- Directed by: Devi Lal Sharma
- Starring: Gurvar Cheema, Aakanksha Sareen, Gugni Gill, Yograj Singh, Gaggu Gill and Sarbjit Cheema
- Release date: 7 December 2018
- Running time: 133 min
- Country: India
- Language: Punjabi

Dulla Vaily is a 2018 Punjabi-language film directed by Devi Lal Sharma. It stars Gurvar Cheema, Aakanksha Sareen, Yograj Singh, Gaggu Gill and Sarbjit Cheema.

== Plot ==
A corrupt landowner terrorizes the local villagers, when a man decides to stand up for them all.

== Cast ==
- Gaggu Gill
- Yograj Singh
- Sarbjit Cheema
- Gurvar Cheema
- Aakanksha Sareen
- Neet Mahal
- Muhmmad Sadiq
- Gugni Gill
