= Jugaadi Dot Com =

- Directed by: Anil vij
- Written by: Bobby Phillauria
- Starring: Nachhatar Gill; Feroz Khan; Sarb Chawla; Rana Ranbir; Mansi Sharma; Komya Virk; Megha Sharma
- Cinematography: Inder Gill
- Edited by: B2 Gill
- Music by: Gurmeet Singh
- Production company: Show Start Productions
- Release date: 25 September 2015
- Country: India
- Language: Punjabi

Jugaadi Dot Com (2015) is a Punjabi romantic comedy film directed by Anil Vij, starring Nachhatar Gill, Feroz Khan, Sarb Chawla, Rana Ranbir, Mansi Sharma, Komya Virk, Megha Sharma, Ghulle Shah, Bhotu Shah, Parkash Gaadu, Dr.Ranjit Riyaz, Cheeku, Babbu Gill, Honey Shergill, Vishv Dipak Trikha and Gajender Phogat.

== Cast ==
- Ehtisham Ahmed
- Nachhatar Gill
- Feroz Khan
- Sarb Chawla
- Rana Ranbir
- Mansi Sharma
- Komya Virk
- Megha Sharma
- Ghulle Shah
- Bhotu Shah
- Parkash Gaadu
- Dr.Ranjit Riyaz
- Cheeku
- Babbu Gill
- Honey Shergill
- Vishwa Deepak Trikha
- Gajender Phogat
- Ashish Rana
