= Yo Yo Honey Singh: Famous =

2024 Netflix documentary film about Yo Yo Honey Singh

- Promotional poster
- Directed by: Mozez Singh
- Produced by: Guneet Monga
- Starring: Yo Yo Honey Singh
- Cinematography: Kanak A. K. Sharma
- Edited by: Deepa Bhatia
- Music by: Matthew Wang
- Production company: Sikhya Entertainment
- Distributed by: Netflix
- Release date: 20 December 2024
- Country: India
- Language: Hindi

Yo Yo Honey Singh: Famous is a 2024 Indian documentary film about rapper and music producer Yo Yo Honey Singh. Directed by Mozez Singh and produced by Sikhya Entertainment for Netflix, the film traces Singh's rapid rise in Punjabi and Bollywood pop, his disappearance from the public eye amid health and legal troubles, and his subsequent attempt at a comeback.

The documentary was released worldwide on Netflix on 20 December 2024. It received mixed reviews from critics, who generally praised its access to the artist and treatment of mental-health issues, while differing on how far it interrogates his controversies and public persona.

== Synopsis ==
The film follows Yo Yo Honey Singh (born Hirdesh Singh) from his childhood and early years in Delhi and Punjab through his emergence as a club-oriented Punjabi and Hindi pop star with songs such as "Brown Rang", "Angreji Beat" and "Lungi Dance". Through interviews, behind-the-scenes footage and archival material, it outlines his ascent in the Indian music industry and his prominence as a hit-making producer and performer.

The documentary then addresses Singh's abrupt retreat from public life in the mid-2010s, framing it primarily through his account of living with bipolar disorder, alcohol dependence and related health issues. It also touches on his marital breakdown and the domestic-violence allegations made by his former wife, which were later settled, while largely presenting these through Singh's and his close associates' perspectives.

Intercut with commentary from music journalists and collaborators, the film presents Singh's return to recording and performance, positioning his "comeback" as both a personal recovery narrative and an attempt to reassert his place in Indian popular music. The film concludes with concert footage and studio sessions that emphasise his ongoing work and relationship with fans.

== Production ==
Netflix announced the project in December 2024 as a feature-length documentary offering an "exclusive look" at Honey Singh's life and career, produced by Sikhya Entertainment and directed by Mozez Singh. Singh had previously directed the medical drama series Human and described Honey Singh as a "fascinating man" whose life contained several distinct phases that the documentary would attempt to explore.

In interviews, Mozez Singh said the production relied on building trust with the artist over an extended period in order to film sensitive material related to his mental-health struggles, addiction and legal troubles. He also noted that Honey Singh's former wife declined to appear on camera, which shaped how those aspects of his life were presented in the film.

The film includes appearances and interview snippets from several of Singh's collaborators and contemporaries in Indian popular cinema and music. Credits listings name Shah Rukh Khan, Salman Khan, Jazzy B and Millind Gaba among those who appear as themselves, alongside concert and studio footage of Honey Singh.

== Release ==
Netflix released the first poster and teaser for Yo Yo Honey Singh: Famous in early December 2024, positioning the project as "the name you know, the story you don't" and emphasising its focus on the "real" person behind the celebrity image.

The documentary premiered on Netflix on 20 December 2024, where it was made available globally as a streaming original.

== Reception ==
=== Critical response ===
Yo Yo Honey Singh: Famous received mixed to moderately positive reviews from critics in India and on international aggregators. On Rotten Tomatoes, it holds six published critic reviews, with commentators broadly agreeing that the film is watchable and emotionally candid but divided over its level of critical distance from its subject.

Saibal Chatterjee of NDTV rated the documentary 2.5 stars out of 5, calling it a "sobering" account of the "highs and crushing lows" of superstardom and noting that it handles sensitive issues in Singh's life with care, even as it remains largely sympathetic to him.

Rohan Naahar of The Indian Express described the film as "a step above" Netflix’s earlier music-focused documentaries but "faintly damning", arguing that it makes only a half-successful attempt to dissect the "myth and mystery" around Honey Singh and is constrained by its closeness to the artist.

Writing for Hindustan Times, Rishabh Suri took a more negative view, calling the film lacking in the musical "edge" associated with Singh’s work and stating that it offers little new insight beyond what had already been teased in promotional material. Other critics were more appreciative.

Other critics were more appreciative. A review in Firstpost praised the way the film charts the journey "from glitter to a dark hole and back", suggesting that it does justice to both the glamorous and difficult phases of Singh's life while framing his comeback as a story of resilience. Troy Ribeiro of Free Press Journal called the film "a reclamation" and found it effective as an intimate portrait, even while acknowledging that it stops short of fully exploring the more troubling aspects of the artist’s public record.

== See also ==
- Yo Yo Honey Singh
- List of Netflix original films
- Documentary film
