= Woofer (song) =

Punjabi song by Dr Zeus

Song by Dr Zeus, Snoop Dogg, Nargis Fakhri and Zora Randhawa
- Released: 13 December 2017
- Studio: BFK Studio, Mumbai and Whitfield Mastering, London
- Genre: Hip hop
- Length: 3:45
- Label: Sony Music India
- Lyricists: Ranaye Kaye, Jaggi Jagowal
- Producer: Dr Zeus

Music video
- "Woofer" on YouTube

"Woofer" is a Punjabi song by British producer Dr Zeus, featuring Snoop Dogg, Zora Randhawa, and Nargis Fakhri. Released on 13 December 2017, as the lead single from the album Global Injection, it was produced by Dr Zeus and released by Sony Music India and BeingU Music. The song won the PTC Punjabi Music Award for Song of the Year in 2018

== Background and release ==
"Woofer" was recorded at Dr Zeus’s BFK Studio in Mumbai and mastered at Whitfield Mastering, London. It features Punjabi vocals by Zora Randhawa, rap by Snoop Dogg, and female vocals by Nargis Fakhri, with additional lyrics by Ranaye Kaye. The song, described as an "urban desi tadka," blends British Punjabi Bhangra with American hip-hop, paying tribute to Dr. Dre and Snoop Dogg’s “Nuthin’ But a G Thang.” The music video was shot in Los Angeles and directed by Matt Alonzo, It was released in December 2017.

== Reception ==
"Woofer" received positive feedback for its cross-cultural fusion, achieving over 5 million views on YouTube within 24 hours.

The song crossed 100 million streams and 80 million views by 2018. The Hindu praised its role in promoting Hindi and Punjabi music globally, while Radioandmusic.com noted its appeal as a "party anthem".

As of July 2025, the music video on YouTube has crossed more than 190 million views.

== Awards ==
In 2018, "Woofer" won the PTC Punjabi Music Award for Best Club Song of the Year, recognizing its impact in the Punjabi music industry.

== Personnel ==
- Dr Zeus: Composer, producer, vocals
- Snoop Dogg: Rap vocals
- Zora Randhawa: Vocals
- Nargis Fakhri: Vocals
- Ranaye Kaye: Female lyrics
- Jaggi Jagowal: Punjabi lyrics
- Matt Alonzo: Music video director
- Naweed: Mastering (Whitfield Mastering, London)
