= Avtar Singh Kang =

- Also known as: A.S. Kang
- Born: 31 December 1949 (age 75); Kultham, District Shaheed Bhagat Singh Nagar, India
- Origin: Birmingham, United Kingdom
- Genres: Punjabi Folk, Bhangra
- Occupation(s): singer-songwriter, player(kabaddi)
- Instrument: Vocals
- Years active: 1972–present
- Labels: Movie box, Gramophone Company India
- Website: www.askang.co.uk

Avtar Singh Kang is a Punjabi singer and Punjabi folk contributor. He is also known as 'A.S.' Kang.

== Career ==
Born to a Sikh family in Kultham village of Nawashehar district of Punjab now called SBS Nagar in Indian Punjab, Kang was educated in the Govt. School for 14 years and then moved to U.K. there he played Kabaddi for some time then recorded his first EP- Lut Ke Lehgai in 1976 in the UK which become a super hit. This was the start of a new Phenomena, Kang was the first UK solo Punjabi artist to release an album. He was also the first UK artist to become international and get a record contract with Gramophone Company India. He was also the first UK Punjabi artist to do a recording in India. This recording was of the Giddian Di Rani Album with music produced by K.S.Narula ( father of Jaspinder Narula). Gidhian di rani has gone on to become one of the biggest hit songs in the history of Punjabi music and made Kang a household name amongst Punjabi people. Kang also became the first Punjabi artist to tour North America and many other countries. He then went on to record many other hits songs including: Ashiq Tera, Lambharan Di Nau, Desi boliyan, Valeti Boliyan and Aish Karo.

== Awards ==
1996 Asian Pop Awards Best Singer Best Album Best lyrics Best dance song Best selling song

In 2010 Kang was awarded "Lifetime Achievement" award the Brit Asia TV Music Awards.

== Recordings ==
He recorded Gidhiyan di raniya in New Delhi with Mr. Narula, which was distributed and produced by Gramophone Company India.

== Discography ==
Year	Album	Music	Label
1976	Jawani Youth	Zella Music.	
1977	Dharmik Geet	Zella Music.	
1978	Gidheyan di raniye		Gramophone Company India
1979	Sunne Rehange Chubare Tere		Gramophone Company India
1980	Duniya Matlab Di	Charanjit Ahuja	Publisher: EMI
1986	Munda Te Kudi		
1996	Kang Fu	Ravi Bal	Moviebox Birmingham, Ltd.
1997	Boliyan		
1998	Untouchable Boliyan		
1999	Greatest Hits Vol-I		
1999	Eternity		
2000	Valeti boliyan		
2000	Gani	Sukshinder Shinda	Moviebox Birmingham, Ltd.
2001	Aish Karo	Sukshinder Shinda	Moviebox Birmingham, Ltd.
2001	Roop De Lashkare		
2002	Dil De De	Sukshinder Shinda	Moviebox Birmingham, Ltd.
2004	Greatest Hits Vol-II		
2004	Pyar	Sukshinder Shinda	Moviebox Birmingham, Ltd.
2010	Flashback Boliyan		
2013	Nachna Punjab Da		
2013	The Maestro	Sukshinder Shinda	Moviebox Birmingham, Ltd.
	Tear Husn		
