= Soni Pabla =

Indian-born Canadian musician (1976–2006)

Background information
- Born: 29 June 1976; Bilaspur, Hoshiarpur, Punjab, India
- Died: 14 October 2006 (aged 30) Brampton, Ontario, Canada
- Occupations: Singer, Lyricist
- Years active: 2002–2006
- Label: Planet Recordz

Soni Pabla (29 June 1976 – 14 October 2006) was an Indian-born musician based in Canada who wrote and sang Punjabi songs. His first album, Heeray Heeray, with Aman Hayer, was released in 2002. He was best known for his collaboration with Joti Dhillon on the album Behind the Scenes, including his song "Gal Dil Di".

Unfinished Project, a tribute EP to Soni Pabla featuring 5 new songs and 2 remixes from his previous albums, was released posthumously in 2013 by Planet Recordz, with music by MoneySpinner.

== Life ==
Soni Pabla was born and raised in a village near Bilaspur, Hoshiarpur, Punjab, India. Soni Pabla moved to Toronto, Canada, in the mid-90s.

He studied music with Rajinder Singh Raj and then with Mahesh Malwani, and signed a recording contract with Planet Recordz, a Canadian record label. Soni released his debut album with Aman Hayer titled "Heeray Heeray" in 2002. In 2005, he teamed up with Sukshinder Shinda to produce his second album titled, "Gal Dil Di", Under Planet Recordz. His album "Eternity (Naseebo)" was a tribute to Soni by his friends and by the Recordz Planet label after his death. This album includes new songs, which Soni had chosen for his album. Some of his songs on this album also feature other guest Punjabi singers. Fans released another album in tribute to him, She is the One – featuring Ikky.

== Death ==
Soni Pabla died at the age of 30, while performing in Brampton, Ontario, Canada on October 14, 2006. After performing a few songs, Soni went backstage to get a glass of water, although the artist collapsed before he could drink. Paramedics tried to revive him, but were unsuccessful and was pronounced dead when he was rushed to a hospital. He had suffered a heart attack.

== Discography ==
Release	Album	Record label
2002	Heeray Heeray By Aman Hayer	Planet Recordz
2005	Gal Dil Di By Sukshinder Shinda	Planet Recordz/Genie Records/Velocity Rekords
2008	Eternity (Naseebo) Family-Friends Tribute	MovieBox/Planet Recordz
2022	She's The One – ft.Ikky – Fans Tribute	4N Records
2024	I Like You - ft. Ikky - Tribute	
(New Year Programme-2006)	Single- Akkhan Billiyan – From Album Tohar Shaukeena Dee	T-Series
14-October-2013	Unfinished Project – Tribute by Money Spinner	Planet Recordz
