= Don't Be Shy =

Don't Be Shy may refer to:

- "Don't Be Shy" (Arisa Mizuki song), 1995
- "Don't Be Shy" (Belly song), 2007
- "Don't Be Shy" (Kulcha song), 1994
- "Don't Be Shy" (Tiësto and Karol G song), 2021
- "Don't Be Shy", a 1971 song by Cat Stevens written for the film Harold and Maude
- "Don't Be Shy", a 2004 song by The Libertines off their album The Libertines
- "Don't Be Shy", a 2008 song by Shwayze off his album Shwayze
- Don't Be Shy (film), a 2026 Indian romantic comedy film

== See also ==
- "Don't Be So Shy", a song by French singer Imany
