= Hussainpur =

- Village
- Location in Punjab, India Hussainpur (India)
- Coordinates: 31.260394°N 75.519266°E
- Country: India
- State: Punjab
- District: Jalandhar

Government
  - Type: Municipal corporation

Population (2011)
  - Total: 1,291

Languages
  - Official: Punjabi
- Time zone: UTC+5:30 (IST)
- Vehicle registration: PB-09

Hussainpur is a census town in Jalandhar district in the Indian state of Punjab. It is situated in Jalandhar II Tehsil. The village code is 030405.

== Demographics ==
According to Census 2011 information the location code or village code of Hussainpur village is 030406. Hussainpur village is located in Jalandhar Ii Tehsil of Jalandhar district in Punjab, India. It is situated 15km away from sub-district headquarter Jalandhar - Ii and 15km away from district headquarter Jalandhar. As per 2009 stats, Hussainpur village is also a gram panchayat.

The total geographical area of village is 119 hectares. Hussainpur has a total population of 1,291 people. There are about 283 houses in Hussainpur village. Jalandhar is nearest town to Hussainpur.

== See also ==
- Lehmber Hussainpuri
