= Bhinda Jatt =

American singer-songwriter

- Born: 15 June 1978 (age 48)
- Genres: Bhangra
- Occupation: singer
- Years active: 1996–present
- Website: bhindajatt.com

Bhinda Jatt, is a Punjabi bhangra singer-songwriter.

== Discography ==
Year	Album	Record label	Music By
1996	California King	Raja Entertainers (India) Golden Star Video (Canada - Vancouver) Newtek Music Co (Canada - Toronto)	Sukshinder Shinda & Kaser KC
1997	Folk Warrior of California	Supertone Melodies (Canada) Kiss Records (UK) Venus Music (India)	Sukshinder Shinda & Kaser KC
1999	It's All Good	Zahid Productions	Kaser KC
2000	Patolah Oh Janda	Raja Entertainers (India) Golden Star Video (Canada)	
2001	Whatz Up Californian Ace	Supertone Melodies Kiss Records (UK)	Sukshinder Shinda
2002	Jhanzer Teri	Audio Touch	
2003	Yaarian	Audio Touch	
2005	Lutt Lia Dil	ISB Records	
2012	Jawani	Genre Records	
2013	Cheere Waleya Munde	MovieBox	
2014	Mere Waheguru	Music Waves	
2016	Giddha Paa	MovieBox/Speed Records	
2025	Still The California King	Sukshinder Shinda Records	Sukshinder Shinda

=== Duo Collaboration ===
Year	Song	Record label	Notes
2010	Glassy Nachdi	MovieBox	Guest appearance with DJ Vix and Surinder Shinda
2015	Kala Chaadra	JN Records	Music By: Bhota Jagpal
2015	Londono	Jassi Records	Music By Jassi J
2016	Truck	MovieBox	Music By: Shaan And Verinder
2016	Patola	MovieBox/Speed Records	Produced by Tru Skool and Kaos Productions
2017	Koi Khaas	MovieBox	Music By: Sukshinder Shinda
2017	Puraaniyan (The Living Legends)	MovieBox	Music By: DJ Vix // With Sharry Mann, Saini Surinder, Kulwinder Billa & Jassi Sidhu
