= Sukshinder Shinda =

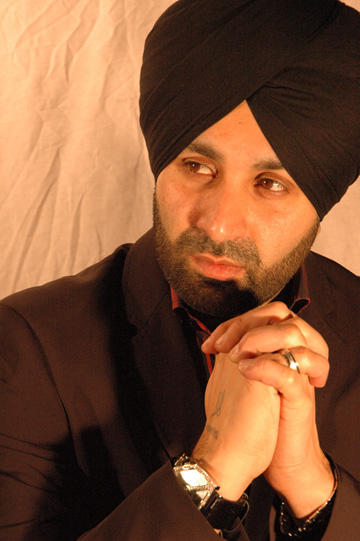

Background information
- Also known as: The Music Man
- Born: Sukshinder Singh Bhullar; January 24, 1972 (age 54)
- Origin: Birmingham, England
- Genres: Bhangra, Indi-pop
- Occupations: Record producer, musician, music director, singer-songwriter
- Years active: 1989 – present
- Labels: MovieBox (United Kingdom); Speed Records (India); Music Waves/Planet Recordz (Canada)
- Website: www.sukshindershinda.com

Sukshinder Shinda (born Sukshinder Singh Bhullar) is a British Indian playback singer-songwriter and bhangra record producer from Handsworth in Birmingham, England. He hails from Dhamai village in the Hoshiarpur district of Punjab, India.

Since releasing his first professional recording in 1993, Dhol Beat Ek, Shinda has produced or collaborated on more than 200 albums, including all of Jazzy B's releases and the majority of Amrinder Gill's.

== Training ==
Sukshinder Shinda learned music from Prof. BS Narang

== Awards ==
In 2006, Sukshinder Shinda won two awards at the UK Asian Music Awards (UKAMA), "Best Album" and "Best Video". In 2008, he won another two awards at the UK Asian Music Awards, "Best Act" and "Best Album" for Living the Dream. In 2010, he won "Best Producer" at the UKAMA. He also won "Best Producer" at the Brit Asia TV Music Awards (BAMA), where he also won "Best Video" for "Ghum Sum". In 2011 he was nominated for Best Album (for Jadoo), Best Producer, Best Male Act and Best Desi Act and ended up winning only Best Producer. In 2012 he won "Best Dressed Act" at the BAMA.

== Discography ==
Release	Album/EPs	Record label
2026	Wah Ji Wah	Sukhshinder Shinda Records
2025	Forever	Sukhshinder Shinda Records
2024	Still The California King	Sukhshinder Shinda Records
2014	Collaborations 3	MovieBox/T-Series/Music Waves
2012	Rock Da Party	MovieBox/Speed Records/Music Waves
2010	Jadoo	MovieBox/T-Series/Music Waves
2009	Collaborations 2	MovieBox/Speed Records/Planet Recordz
2007	Living the Dream	MovieBox/Speed Records/Planet Recordz
2006	Collaborations	MovieBox/Speed Records/Planet Recordz
2005	Balle	MovieBox/Speed Records/Music Waves
2003	Gal Sunja	MovieBox/Tips
2003	Living Loud	MovieBox/Tips
2002	Phases	MovieBox/Tips
2001	The Way It Is	MovieBox/Tips
2000	The OG's	MovieBox
1999	Living Loud	MovieBox
2000	Men of Respect	MovieBox/Speed Records
1998	Dhol Beat 2 (Takue Te Takua)	Kiss Records/Venus Music/Music Waves
1998	Fatal Attraction	MovieBox
1997	Kudos	MovieBox
1996	Maximum Bass	Hi-Tech Music Distributors
1995	World of Bass – EP	Hi-Tech Music Distributors
1994	Dhol Beat	Fantronic Ltd

=== Religious Discography ===
Release	Album	Record label
2025	Sab Da Bhala	Sukhshinder Shinda Records
2013	Choj Khalseh De	Dharam Seva Records/Elite Music
2009	Satguru Mera	Moviebox/Music Waves/Starmakers

=== Singles ===
Release	Track	Singer	Music	Label
2021	The World Is Watching	Sukshinder Shinda	Sukshinder Shinda	EkBaaz Motion Pictures
2020	Sohni Lagadi 2 (feat. HMC)	Sukshinder Shinda	Sukshinder Shinda	Tips Music
2020	Thrill (feat. Gurlez Akhtar)	Sukshinder Shinda	Sukshinder Shinda	Worldwide Records
2019	Tere Bina Yaara	Sukshinder Shinda	Sukshinder Shinda	Music Express
2019	Thirty Six	Sukshinder Shinda	Sukshinder Shinda	Music Express
2019	Udd Nankane Chaliye	Sukshinder Shinda	Sukshinder Shinda	Sukshinder Shinda Records
2019	Guru Nanak Mehma	Sukshinder Shinda	Sukshinder Shinda	Sukshinder Shinda Records
2019	Satguru Nanak Aaye Ne	Sukshinder Shinda With Various	Harshdeep Kaur	Harshdeep Kaur
2018	Gachni Da Lep	Sukshinder Shinda	Sukshinder Shinda	T Series
2018	Singh - The Warriors	Sukshinder Shinda	Sukshinder Shinda	Sukshinder Shinda Records
2018	Rog	Sukshinder Shinda	Sukshinder Shinda	T Series
2018	Yaar Di Jago	Sukshinder Shinda	Sukshinder Shinda	T Series
2017	Tere Naal Saah Chalde	Sukshinder Shinda	Sukshinder Shinda	T Series
2015	Ek Hor La De	Sukshinder Shinda	DJ Vix	Moviebox
2013	Dil Vaarda	Sukshinder Shinda	Harj Nagra	Moviebox
2012	"The Folk King" (Kuldeep Manak Tribute)	A.S. Kang, Jazzy B, Sukshinder Shinda, Malkit Singh, Manmohan Waris Balwinder Safri & Angrej Ali	Aman Hayer	MovieBox
2012	Hurrr	Sukshinder Shinda & Jazzy B	Sukshinder Shinda	MovieBox/Speed Records
2012	Nanka Mail	Sukshinder Shinda	Sukshinder Shinda	MovieBox/Speed Records
2009	Yarrian Banayi Rakhi Yarrian	Sukshinder Shinda & Jazzy B	Sukshinder Shinda	MovieBox/Speed Records
2009	Ghum Sum Ghum Sum	Sukshinder Shinda & Rahat Fateh Ali Khan	Sukshinder Shinda	MovieBox/Speed Records

=== Production discography ===
Release	Album	Artist	Record label
2017	Folk N Funky 2	Jazzy B	Zee Music Company
2013	The Maestro	Avtar Singh Kang	MovieBox/Elite Music
2011	Maharajas	Jazzy B	MovieBox/Speed Records/Music Waves
2010	Sardara's Quest	Sardara Gill	Hi-Tech Media
2009	Dooriyan	Amrinder Gill	MovieBox/Speed Records/Planet Recordz
2009	Chad Ke Na Jah	Nachhatar Gill	MovieBox/Speed Records/Planet Recordz
2008	Rambo	Jazzy B	MovieBox/Speed Records/Planet Recordz
2008	Nazaran Miliyan	Harbhajan Mann	Think Big Entertainment
2007	Ishq	Amrinder Gill	MovieBox/Speed Records/Planet Recordz
2006	Gal Dil Di	Soni Pabla	Planet Recordz/Velocity Recordz
2005	Dildarian	Amrinder Gill	Kamlee Records LTD/Music Waves
2005	UK Dhol Crusader	Various	Tips
2004	Pyar	Avtar Singh Kang	MovieBox/Planet Recordz
2004	Romeo	Jazzy B	MovieBox/Tips/Music Waves
2002	Tera Roop	Jazzy B	MovieBox/Tips/Music Waves
2002	Tere Sadgay	Tariq Khan Legacy	Kamlee Records
2002	Dil De De	Avtar Singh Kang	MovieBox
2001	Oh Kehri	Jazzy B	MovieBox/Tips/Music Waves
2001	Aish Karo	Avtar Singh Kang	MovieBox
2000	Stayin Real (Surma)	Jazzy B	Kiss Records/Tips
2000	Gani Gani (Necklace)	Avtar Singh Kang	MovieBox
1999	All Eyez On Me	Jazzy B	Kiss Records/Venus
1998	California King (Heart Breaker / Ajj Nachna)	Bhinda Jatt	Raja Entertainers
1998	Rajj Ke Desi	Various	ROMA II LIMITED/EMPIRE MUSIC LIMITED
1997	Folk Warrior Of California	Bhinda Jatt	Supertone/Venus
1997	Folkal Attraction	Jazzy B	Venus
1996	True Colors	Dippa Dosanjh	Hi-Tech
1995	Folk N Funky	Jazzy B	Supertone/Peritone
1994	The Canadian Spice	Jazzy B	Supertone
1993	Ghugian Da Jorra	Jazzy B	Supertone/Peritone
1993	Hit The Roof	Mohan Singh Nimmana (Nimmana Group)	Hi-Tech Music Ltd.

=== Film discography ===
Release	Film	Singer	Music
2020	Jawaani Jaaneman (song "Gallan Kardi")	Jazzy B and Apache Indian	
2018	Ik Onkaar		
2014	Romeo Ranjha	Jazzy B, Garry Sandhu	Sukshinder Shinda & Jatinder Singh Shah
2014	Kaum De Heere	Raj Kakra	Sukshinder Shinda & Beat Minister
2013	Best of Luck	Jazzy B	Sukshinder Shinda & Jatinder Singh Shah
2010	It's a Wonderful Afterlife (song "Ghum Suhm")	Sukshinder Shinda and Rahat Fateh Ali Khan	
2010	Ik Kudi Punjab Di	Amrinder Gill	Sukshinder Shinda
2009	Munde U.K. De	Amrinder Gill	Sukshinder Shinda, Babloo Kumar
2008	Ishq Be Parwah	Tej Hundal, Shweta Pandit & Meshi Eshara	Sukshinder Shinda, Jeeti Singh & Attique Malik
2006	Teesri Aankh: The Hidden Camera	Jazzy B	Sukshinder Shinda, Nitz 'N' Sony & Harry Anand
2006	Dil Apna Punjabi	Harbhajan Mann	Sukshinder Shinda
2000	Shaheed Uddham Singh	Jazzy B and Gurdas Maan	Sukshinder Shinda

== See also ==
- List of British Sikhs
