= Rock da Party =

Rock Da Party

Studio album by Sukshinder Shinda
- Released: 2012
- Genres: Punjabi, Pop
- Length: 34 Minutes
- Labels: MovieBox Records, Music Waves & Speed Records
- Producer: Sukshinder Shinda

Sukshinder Shinda chronology
Jadoo (2010)	Rock Da Party (2012)	Collaborations 3 (2014)

Rock Da Party is the studio album by Sukshinder Shinda released on 12 July 2012.

Videos were released for "Nanka Mail", "Hurrr", "Ni Sohniye Ni", "Mucch Khari", and "One in a Million".

== Track listing ==
All music composed by Sukshinder Shinda

No.	Title	Lyrics	Length
1.	"Ni Sohniye Ni on YouTube"	Koki Deep & Sukshinder Shinda	4:41
2.	"Rock Da Party ft. J Gib of Takeova Ent."	Amarjit Musapuria & Sukshinder Shinda	5:01
3.	"Saari Raat Nachdi Rahi"	Bachan Bedil & Sukshinder Shinda	3:23
4.	"Mucch Khaari"	Jass Varran Wala & Sukshinder Shinda	4:05
5.	"One in a Million ft. Rawsmoov & J Gib of Takeova Ent."	Gurminder Maddoke & Sukshinder Shinda	4:00
6.	"Note Te Photo Pagh Wale"	Gurminder Maddoke & Sukshinder Shinda	4:32
7.	"Nanka Mail"	Jinder Bhandal & Sukshinder Shinda	8:11
8.	"Hanju"	Qaisar Nadeem Guddu & Sukshinder Shinda	4:31
9.	"Lorh Na Pendhi"	Vijay Dhammi & Sukshinder Shinda	4:24
10.	"Do Pegg Desi De ft. Don Revo"	Balli Jethuwal & Sukshinder Shinda	2:59
11.	"Yaar Da Viah"	Amarjit Musapuria & Sukshinder Shinda	4:35
12.	"Hurrr on YouTube"	Jitt Salala & Sukshinder Shinda	5:02
13.	"Zamana Fast Ho Gaya"	Sandhu Patiala, Avtar Ibban & Sukshinder Shinda	4:45
Total length:			34:37
