= Satwinder Bitti =

- Born: 29 November 1975 (age 50)
- Genres: Folk, Bhangra
- Occupations: Singing, musician

Satwinder Bitti (Punjabi: ਸਤਵਿੰਦਰ ਬਿੱਟੀ) is a Punjabi singer of Punjab, India. She was a national-level hockey player and later adapted singing as profession. In 2011, she judged a singing reality show, Awaaz Punjab Di, by a Punjabi TV channel mh1.

== Early life ==
Bitti was born in a Punjabi Sikh family, to father S. Gurnaib Singh and mother Gurcharan Kaur. Her father, retired from PWD, Patiala, also had an interest in music and taught her the basics of music. She used to sing religious songs on different devotional functions and thus started singing at a very early age of five. She is the fan of the singer Lata Mangeshkar and later, took singing as a profession and released many religious and folk albums. She has done a BSc. (non-medical) from MCM DAV College, Chandigarh Sec-36 and was a national-level hockey player.

In June 2016 Bitti joined Indian National Congress in presence of party's state chief Amarinder Singh and senior leaders.

== Career ==
She started her singing career with the album, Pure Dee Hawa.

== Discography ==
- Pure Di Hawa
- Ik Vari Hass Ke
- Nachdi De Siron Patase
- Chandi Dian Jhanjran
- Nachna Patola Banke
- Dil De Mareez
- Giddhe Ch Gulabo Nachdi
- Mar Gayee Tere Te
- Main Ni Mangna Karauna
- Nachdi Main Nachdi
- Pardesi Dhola
- Sabar
- Khand Da Khedna
- Ve Sajjna

=== Religious ===
- Dhann Teri Sikhi {2002}
- Roohan Rabb Dian
- Nishan Khalse De
- Mae Ni Main Singh Sajna
- Sikhi khandeyo Tikhi
