= Kanth Kaler =

- Born: 7 May 1972 (age 54); Nakodar, Jalandhar, Punjab, India
- Genres: Folk; Bhangra
- Occupation: Singer
- Years active: 1994–present
- Website: www.kanthkaler.com

Kanth Kaler (born 7 May 1972) is an Indian singer who is associated with Punjabi Music. His songs include Hun Teri Nigah Badal Gai, Ek Mera Dil, Dass Asi Kehra Tere Bina Mar Challea, Udikan, and Teri Yaad Sajna.

== Personal life ==
He was born at in Ravidassia family at Nakodar, Jalandhar, Punjab, India. His original name being Sunny Nijjar, he changed his name after being advice by his spiritual Guru Baba Murad Shah to place the Kanth (voice) before all.

He recorded his first album Hun teri nigah badal gayi with the help of famous lyricist Kumar Dhaliwal and Madan Jalandhari, who was really impressed by his voice.

== Albums ==
- Ik Saah
- Fanna
- Armaan
- Tere Bin
- Aadat
- Sadhra
- Doriya
- Intezar
- Tu Chete Ave
- Teri Yaad Sajna
- Teri Akh Vairne
- Dhol Janiya
- Hun Teri Nigah Badal Gai
- Pichhon Mukar Na Javi
- Sad Songs – Vol. 9
- Anmol – The Priceless
- Daaru penda
- Armaan-the endless quest of love
- Fanaa
- Jai Bhim, dedicated to Dr. B.R. Ambedkar
- Asin Udhde Aasre Tere
- Sher Da Yaar (Music By: Tru-Skool/Label: MovieBox)

== Awards ==
He was received the Sandhu Singh Hardam Award and Mirchi Music Award in 2018.
