= Satrangi Peengh 2 =

Album by Harbhajan Mann and Gursewak Mann

Studio album by Harbhajan Mann & Gursewak Mann
- Released: 27 December 2012
- Genres: Punjabi, pop
- Length: 34 minutes
- Label: T-Series
- Producer: Jaidev Kumar

Harbhajan Mann & Gursewak Mann chronology
Vaari Vaari (2010)	Satrangi Peengh 2 (2012)	Ik Ongar (2013)

Satrangi Peengh 2 is a studio album by Harbhajan Mann and Gursewak Mann released on 27 December 2012.

== Track listing ==
All lyrics are written by Babu Singh Maan; all music is composed by Jaidev Kumar.

No.	Title	Length
1.	"Yaadaan Reh Jaaniyan"	4:53
2.	"Pari Parauni Aayi"	4:03
3.	"Vanjaara"	5:13
4.	"Baabe Bishne Di Baithak"	4:52
5.	"O Chali Gayee"	5:29
6.	"Phulkari"	4:32
7.	"Punjab Bolda Haan"	5:06
8.	"Choun Ku Dina Da Mela"	5:02
9.	"Shaheed Bhagat Singh"	6:06
Total length:		34:37

== Awards ==
PTC Punjabi Music Awards 2013

- Won - Best Folk Pop Album
