= Jazzy B =

Indo-Canadian singer and songwriter (born Alril 1,1969)

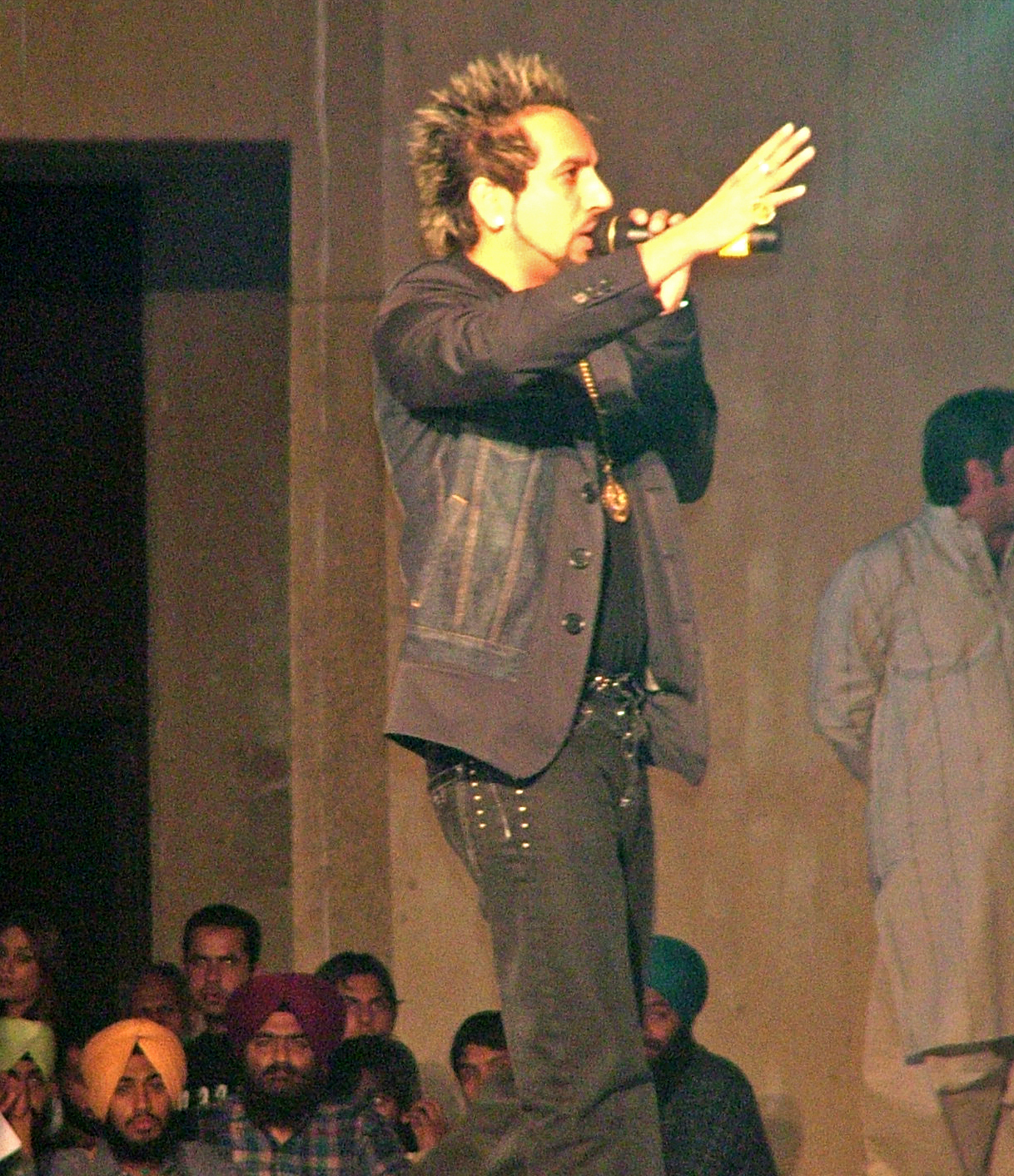
- Bains in 2005

Background information
- Born: Jaswinder Singh Bains; April 1, 1969 (age 57); Punjab, India
- Origin: Surrey, British Columbia, Canada
- Genre: Bhangra Hip hop
- Occupations: Singer; actor
- Years active: 1993–present
- Website: jazzyb.com

Jaswinder Singh Bains, known professionally as Jazzy B, is an Indian-born Canadian singer, songwriter, and actor. He has worked in Indian music and films mainly in Punjabi and Hindi.

== Early life and career ==
Jazzy B, born April 1, 1969, moved from Punjab to Canada at a young age, settling in Surrey, British Columbia. His first album Gugiyan Da Jora was released in 1993. The rhythm was played by Sukhshinder Shinda who suggested that he move to England if he wanted a prominent career in Punjabi music.

He is a big fan of the late singer Kuldeep Manak. Jazzy has released 12 studio albums, and two religious ones. He has collaborated on tracks with other artists.

== Career ==
From his music video "Surma", actor John Abraham started his modelling career in 2000. In 2001, his song "Oh Kehri" from his eponymous album featured Celina Jaitley. Mahek Chahal featured in his songs and videos "Jindey" and "Chak De Boli". He is known for his song "Dil Luteya" with Apache Indian from his album Romeo. Esha Gupta featured in his song "Glassy" from the album Rambo in 2008. Surveen Chawla appeared in his song "Naag 2" in 2010. He sang a song named "Fukraa" for Emraan Hashmi starrer movie Rush in 2012.

In 2013, he sang the song "Jugni" for Jimmy Sheirgill, Irrfan Khan, Soha Ali Khan, and Mahie Gill-starrer Saheb, Biwi Aur Gangster Returns.

In 2014, actress Surveen Chawla once again appeared in his duet song "Mitran De Boot". In 2014 he also sung for movie Shaadi Ke Side Effects starring Farhan Akhtar and Vidya Balan. In 2015, he worked with rapper Snoop Dogg for the song "Most Wanted" which is featured in MTV India. In the same year, he was featured in title song "Zalim Dilli" from the film Dilliwali Zaalim Girlfriend with Hard Kaur. His old song "Sat Rangey" was used in the background music of the Hollywood movie Deadpool in 2016.

He is the first South Asian entertainer to have his name added to the BC Entertainment Hall of Fame Star Walk in Vancouver. In 2016, he sang a song "Love The Way You Dance" for movie Tutak Tutak Tutiya starring Prabhu Deva, Tamannaah and Sonu Sood. In 2017 Bigg Boss Season 10 contestant Lopamudra Raut was featured in his song "Crazy Ya" from the album Folk 'N' Funky 2. In 2019 he sang the song "Ajj Singh Garjega" for Akshay Kumar's film Kesari.

In 2020, his song "Jine Mera Dil Luteya" was recreated as "Gaallan Kardi" with Jyotica Tangri & Mumzy Stranger for Saif Ali Khan, Tabu & Alaya Furniturewala starrer Jawaani Jaaneman. In 2022, he appeared in the song "Ghaint Galbaat" with Zareen Khan in the Punjabi film Posti.

He appeared as a judge in Zee Punjabi reality TV show Sa Re Ga Ma Pa Punjabi with Sonu Kakkar and Jaidev Kumar. The show's participants were mentored by Gurdas Mann. In 2024, Jazzy B featured in AP Dhillon’s song “315” from the album The Brownprint.

He also gave surprise performances at AP Dhillon’s concerts first in Delhi along with Yo Yo Honey Singh and then in Chandigarh. In the same year, he appeared in the Netflix documentary Yo Yo Honey Singh: Famous, which explored the life and career of Yo Yo Honey Singh.

In 2025, Jazzy B performed at the Juno Awards of 2025 and his song "Coolin" was also nominated as South Asian Music Recording of the Year.

=== Acting career ===
In 2000, Jazzy made his film debut in Shaheed Udham Singh. In 2006 he appeared in Sunny Deol's movie Teesri Aankh: The Hidden Camera with Ameesha Patel in the song "Chuk De Punjabi".

In 2013, he made his debut with the film Best of Luck as an actor with Punjabi singer and actor Gippy Grewal and Miss India Universe 2008 Simran Kaur Mundi. The shooting of this film commenced in Vancouver, British Columbia, Canada in May 2012. He made special appearance in Diljit Dosanjh's Jatt & Juliet 2 in 2013.

In 2014, he appeared in Romeo Ranjha. In a news story published in April, it was revealed that while doing stunts for Romeo Ranjha, Jazzy underwent serious injuries wherein he even had "near-death" experience. He was quoted as saying, "I literally left my body. I could feel everyone trying to resuscitate me. I remember my whole life flashing before my eyes, and surprisingly, I wasn't thinking about winning awards or anything like that. The only thing I cared about was that I wanted to live because I did not want to leave my family so soon".

In 2014, he made a special appearance in Dharmendra and Gippy Grewal's film Double Di Trouble. He also appeared as a cop in suspense thriller Punjabi movie Snowman: The Dark Side of Canada along with Neeru Bajwa, Rana Ranbir and Arshi Khatkar.

== Discography ==
=== Studio albums ===
Year	Album/ EP	Record label	No. of tracks	Music	Format
2026	"Coast 2 Coast"	Jazzy B Records	5	Chani Nattan	
2025	Cobra	Jazzy B Records	5	Black Virus	
2024	Ustad Ji King Forever feat. Kuldeep Manak & Yudhveer Manak	Jazzy B Records	13	Joy Atul, Shan & Verinder, Kaos Productions, Aman Hayer, Jassi Bros, Harj Nagra, SYNC, Prince Saggu, G Guri, Desi Frenzy	
2023	Ishq Di EP	Jazzy B Records	07	Chet Singh, Jashan Inder, Aman Hayer, Starboy X	
2023	Born Ready	Jazzy B Records	11	Dr Zeus & Aman Hayer	CD, Cassette & Vinyl
2017	Folk 'N' Funky	Zee Music Company	12	Sukshinder Shinda	CD, Cassette & Vinyl
2011	Maharajas	MovieBox (UK); Speed Records (India); Music Waves (USA & Canada)	12	Sukshinder Shinda	CD
2008	Rambo	MovieBox (UK); Speed Records (India); Planet Recordz (USA & Canada)	11	Sukshinder Shinda	CD & Cassette
2007	"Kaun Nachdi"/"Who Z Dancin"(single)	Music Waves (USA & Canada) Orential Star Agencies (UK) Tips (India)	5	Ravi Bal	CD & Cassette
2004	Romeo	MovieBox (UK); Tips (India); Music Waves (USA & Canada)	10	Sukshinder Shinda	CD & Cassette
2002	Tera Roop	MovieBox (UK); Tips (India); Music Waves (USA & Canada)	9	Sukshinder Shinda	CD & Cassette
2001	Oh Kehri	MovieBox (UK); Music Waves (USA & Canada); Tips (India)	8	Sukshinder Shinda	CD & Cassette
2000	Stayin' Real; Surma	Kiss Records (UK); Music Waves (USA & Canada); Tips (India)	9; 8	Sukshinder Shinda	CD & Cassette
1999	All Eyez on Me	Kiss Records (UK) Venus (India); Music Waves (USA & Canada)	9	Sukshinder Shinda	CD & Cassette
1997	Folkal Attraction Pyar Da Mukadma	Zahid Music (UK); SuperTone Melodies (India); Music Waves (USA & Canada)	8	Sukshinder Shinda	CD, Cassette & Vinyl
1995	Folk 'N' Funky	Kiss Records (UK); SuperTone Melodies (India); Music Waves (USA & Canada)	8	Sukshinder Shinda	CD, Cassette & Vinyl
1994	Get Back	SuperTone Melodies (India, USA & Canada) Venus (India)	11	Sukshinder Shinda	Cassette
1993	Ghugian Da Jorra - The Canadian Spice	Kiss Records (UK); SuperTone Melodies (India, USA & Canada)	8	Sukshinder Shinda	CD & Cassette

=== Religious albums ===
Year	Album	Record label	No. of tracks	Music
2003	Sikhi Khandiyon Tikhi	MovieBox (UK) Tips (India) Music Waves (USA & Canada)	9	Sukshinder Shinda
1999	Singhan Di Kaum Bahadur	MovieBox (UK) Tips (India) Music Waves (USA & Canada)	8	Sukshinder Shinda

=== Soundtracks ===
Year	Song	Movie	Record label	Music
2024	Jatt Shikari (feat: Pardhaan)	Alzheimer	Dharamvir Thandi Presents	Bhinda Aujla
2022	Jatt Bolde (feat: Gippy Grewal & Manpreet Hans)	Snowman: The Dark Side of Canada	Saga Hits	Bhinda Aujla
2022	Ghaint Galbaat (feat: Zareen Khan)	Posti	Humble Music	Late So New Ramgharia
2020	Gallan Kardi (feat: Jyotica Tangri & Mumzy Stranger)	Jawaani Jaaneman	Tips	Prem & Hardeep
2019	Ajj Singh Garjega	Kesari	Zee Music Company	Chirantan Bhatt
2017	Gobind Da Sardar	Sardar Saab	Music & Sound	Millind Gaba
2016	Love The Way You Dance (feat: Millind Gaba)	Tutak Tutak Tutiya	T-Series	Millind Gaba
2015	Etwaar	Faraar	Sippy Grewal Productions	Jatinder Shah
2015	Zalim Dilli (feat: Hard Kaur)	Dilliwali Zaalim Girlfriend	T-Series	Tigerstyle
2014	Ghora	Yoddha	Speed Records	Popsy (The Music Machine)
2014	Tich Lagdi	Romeo Ranjha	White Hill Studios	Jatinder Shah
2014	Chote Kaake	Romeo Ranjha	White Hill Studios	Jatinder Shah
2014	Romeo Ranjha (Duet) Ft. Garry Sandhu	Romeo Ranjha	White Hill Studios	Jatinder Shah
2014	Romeo Ranjha	Romeo Ranjha	White Hill Studios	Jatinder Shah
2014	Harry is not Brahmachari (feat: Divya Kumar & Ishq Bector)	Shaadi Ke Side Effects	T-Series	Pritam
2014	26 Ban Gai (feat: Gippy Grewal)	Double Di Trouble	Speed Records	Popsy - The Music Machine
2013	Jatt Kaim	Best of Luck	Speed Records & White Hill Studios	Jatinder Shah
2013	Happy Shappy	Best of Luck	Speed Records & White Hill Studios	Jatinder Shah
2013	Goli Hik Vich	Best of Luck	Speed Records & White Hill Studios	Jatinder Shah
2013	Baghi	Sadda Haq	Jazzy B Records	Jassi Bros
2013	Jugni	Saheb, Biwi Aur Gangster Returns	Junglee Music	Sandeep Chowta
2012	Fukraa	Rush	T-Series	Pritam
2006	Chuk De Punjabi	Teesri Aankh: The Hidden Camera	Tips	Sukshinder Shinda
2000	Udham Singh	Shaheed Uddham Singh	MovieBox	Sukshinder Shinda

=== Singles ===
Year	Song	Music	Peak Chart Position	Record label	Notes
2013	Feem (Cut Like A Diamond)	Partners in Rhyme		Replay Music/ Sony Music India	Single
2014	Rise Above Hate	Millind Gaba		Jazzy B Records/MTV Spoken Word Production	Panasonic Mobile
2015	Singhan Di Talwar	Beat Minister	31		Jazzy B Records
2015	Most Wanted ft. Mr. Capone-E & Snoop Dogg	Ji-Madz EWC		Jazzy B Records/MTV Spoken Word Production	First Time Collaborating
2015	Repeat	JSL Singh		Speed Records	Lyrics: Balkar Nandghria
2016	Attwaadi ft. Kaur B	Dr. Zeus		Speed Records	Lyrics: Raj Ranjodh
2016	Leap Wala Saal	DJ Flow		Speed Records	Lyrics: Veet Baljit
2016	Dynamite	Dr. Zeus		Moviesbox	Roach Killa
2016	Trendster	Deep Jandu	15	Speed Records	Gangis Khan Lyrics : Karan Aujla
2017	Manke To Manak	Sukshinder Shinda		Jazzy B Records	Nav Garhiwala
2017	Bamb Gaana	Harj Nagra		Jazzy B Records	Lyrics: Gursewak Dhillon
2017	Shaheed Kaum De	Ranjha Yaar		Jazzy B Records	Jung Sandhu
2018	One Million	Dj Flow		Speed Records	Lyrics: Singga
2018	90 Di Bandook	Harj Nagra	18	Jazzy B Records	Lyrics: Karan Aujla
2018	Miss Karda	Kuwar Virk		T-Series	Lyrics: Kuwar Virk
2019	Udhne Sapoliye	Jassi Bros	16	Planet Recordz	Lyrics: Satti Khokhewalia
2019	Maa Boli	Aman Hayer		Jazzy B Records	Lyrics: Ninder Moranwalia
2019	Khande To Khalsa	Jassi Bros		Jazzy B Records	Lyrics: Sandhey Sukhbir
2019	Worldwide	Harj Nagra		Jazzy B Records	Lyrics: Ninder Moranwalia
2019	Dhan Dhan Baba Nanak	Jassi Bros		Jass Records	Lyrics: Satti Khokhewalia
2019	Aaja	Jassi Bros		Jazzy B Records	Lyrics: Kaddon Wala Jeet
2020	All Eyez On Me	Roach Killa		Sony Music India	Lyrics: GV, Lally Mundi
2020	Nishana Ft. Bohemia	Shaxe Oriah		Saga Music	Lyrics: Bohemia & Gitta Bains
2020	Put Sardara De	Byg Byrd		Revolution Records	Lyrics: Amrit Bova
2020	Crown Prince Ft. Bohemia	Harj Nagra		Tips	Lyrics: Parry Sarpanch & Bohemia
2020	Loha	Aman Hayer		Jazzy B Records	Lyrics: Amrit Bova
2020	Manak Diyan Kaliyan	Snappy		Music Builderzz	Lyrics: Rav Hanjra
2020	Bagawatan	Harj Nagra		Jazzy B Records	Lyrics: Varinder Sema
2020	Zimidaar	Karnail The Music Factory		Jazzy B Records	Lyrics: Balkar Nandgarhia
2021	Teer Punjab Ton	Jassi Bros		Jazzy B Records	Lyrics: Navi Bassi Pathana &Varinder Sema
2021	Kisaan Parade	Sembhi		Jazzy B Records	Lyrics: Jeeta Rudkee Wala
2021	Bodi Wale Taare Takk	Ikwinder Singh		Jazzy B Records	Lyrics: Veet Baljit
2021	Vatan Punjab	Jassi Bros		Jazzy B Records	Lyrics: Kaddon Wala Jeet
2021	Aaja Bapu - Love U Papa	Kuljit		Jazzy B Records	Lyrics: Rana Ranbir
2021	Lalkaare	Jay K		Jazzy B Records	Lyrics: Manna Mandd
2021	Ranjhe Nu Jogi Karta	Black Life Studios		Jazzy B Records	Lyrics: Deep Cheema
2021	Jitt	Deep Royce		Jazzy B Records	Lyrics: Satti Khokhewalia
2022	Step Back	Inda Bains		Jazzy B Records	Lyrics: Gurminder Maddoke
2022	Jattz N The Hood	DesiFrenzy		DesiFrenzy Records	Lyrics: Vilene
2022	Balori Akhiyan Ft. Shortie (Littlelox)	Dr Zeus		Jazzy B Records	Lyrics: Preet Harpal
2023	Panth Khalsa	Kuljit Singh		Jazzy B Records	Lyrics: Harvinder Oharpuri
2023	Real Talk Ft. Legha	Dr Zeus		Jazzy B Records	Lyrics: Bir Singh
2024	Blush	Deep Jandu		Royal Music Gang	Lyrics: Fateh Shergill
2024	Maa Gujri De Potey	Agaazz		Jazzy B Records	Lyrics: Pirti Silon
2025	Mard Agamda Ft. Kanwar & Dhadi Tarsem Singh Moranwali	Black Virus		Folk N Funky Music	Lyrics: Gurminder Maddoke
2025	Snake Charmer Kudi	Shaan & Varinder		Folk N Funky Music	Lyrics: Lucky Singh Durgapuria

=== Collaborations ===
Year	Work	Label	Notes
2024	Coolin Ft. Inderpal Moga		G-Funk, Lyrics: Chani Nattan
2024	315 Ft. AP Dhillon & Shinda Kahlon		AP Dhillon, Lyrics: Shinda Kahlon
2024	Old Memories Ft. Mani Longia		SYNC, Lyrics: Mani Longia
2023	Sikhi Vs Maut Ft. Dhadi Tarsem Singh Moranwali & Mani Cheema	Jazzy B Records	Mr Rubal, Lyrics: Jimmy Ahmedgarh
2022	Mirze Da Yaar Ft. Sargam Pooja	Jazzy B Records	Kaos Productions, Lyrics: Jeet Sandhu
2021	Purani Yaari Ft. Babbu Maan	Jazzy B Records	Harj Nagra, Lyrics: Babbu Maan
2021	Patole Ft. Sonu Kakkar	Tips	Kuwar Virk, Lyrics:Jang Sandhu
2019	Dil Mangdi	Speed Records	Sukh-E, Apache Indian, Jaani
2018	Jatt Da Flag	T-Series	With Kaur B & Tru-Skool; Lyrics: Amrit Bova
2016	Shikaar	Speed Records	Preet Hundal, With Kaur B & Amrit Maan
2014	Jehra Tere Vich Bolda (Collaborations 3)	MovieBox	With Sukshinder Shinda (duo collaboration)
2014	Mitran De Boot (single)	Jazzy B Records & Speed Records	With Kaur B & Dr. Zeus
2014	Singhan Diyan Gadiyan (single)	MovieBox/Speed Records	With Popsy The Music Machine
2013	The Holi War	Benaras Media Works	With Bappi Lahiri
2012	The Folk King – A Tribute To Kuldip Manak	MovieBox	With Aman Hayer
2012	This Party Gettin' Hot (single)	Jazzy B Records/Speed Records	With Yo Yo Honey Singh; Lyrics: Alfaaz
2010	Naag 2 (Hyper)	Kamlee Records Ltd/Speed Records/Planet Recordz	With Popsy The Music Machine (duo collaboration)
2009	Satguru Mera	MovieBox/StarMakers/Music Waves	With Sukhshinder Shinda (duo collaboration on tracks 2, 4, 6 & 9)
2009	Yaariyan Banayi Rakhi (Collaborations 2)	Planet Recordz	With Sukhshinder Shinda (duo collaboration)
2008	Chargai Sohniye	Genie Records/Speed Records/Planet Recordz	With Aman Hayer and DJ Kendall (duo collaboration)
2006	Oh Na Kuri Labdi (Collaborations)	Planet Recordz	With Sukhshinder Shinda (duo collaboration)
2002	Ral Khushian Manaiye	Kiss Records/Tips	With Ranjit Mani, Sarbjit Cheema, and Balkar Sidhu
2001	Chak De Boli (The Way It Is)	MovieBox	With Sukshinder Shinda
2001	Pawarey Teri Akh De Soniye (Hoye Hoye II)	Kiss Records	With DJ Sheikh
2001	Patlo - M2	OSA	With Balwinder Safri, KS Makan and more
1998	Akh De Esharey - The Original Dhol In The Mix	DMC	With Surinder Shinda, Surjit Bindrakhia and more

== Television ==
Year	Show	Role	Notes
2020	Sa Re Ga Ma Pa Punjabi	Judge	Along with Sonu Kakkar and Jaidev Kumar

== Filmography ==
Year	Film	Role	Notes
2000	Shaheed Udham Singh	Himself	Special appearance
2006	Teesri Aankh: The Hidden Camera	Himself	Special appearance in Bollywood film
2013	Jatt & Juliet 2	Himself	Special appearance
2013	Best of Luck	Goli	Debut Punjabi film
2014	Romeo Ranjha	Romeo	With Garry Sandhu
2014	Double Di Trouble	Himself	Special appearance
2015	Faraar	Himself	Special appearance for song "Etwar"
2022	Posti	Himself	Special appearance for song "Ghaint Galbaat"
2022	Snowman: The Dark Side of Canada	Vikram	With Neeru Bajwa & Rana Ranbir

== Documentary ==
Year	Documentary	Role
2024	Yo Yo Honey Singh: Famous	Himself

== Awards and nominations ==
Year	Song/album/movie	Award ceremony	Category	Result
2011	Jazzy B and Band	Brit Asia TV Music Awards	Best Band	Won
2012		PTC Punjabi Music Awards	Best Non Resident Punjabi Vocalist	Won
2012	"Hukam"	PTC Punjabi Music Awards	Best Music Video	Won
2012	Maharajas	PTC Punjabi Music Awards	Best Non Resident Punjabi Album	Won
2012	Maharajas	Brit Asia TV Music Awards	Best Album of the Year	Nominated
2012	"Hukam"	Brit Asia TV Music Awards	Best Music Video	Won
2012		Brit Asia TV Music Awards	Best Dressed Act	Nominated
2012		Brit Asia TV Music Awards	Best Male Act	Won
2013	"This Party Gettin Hot"	PTC Punjabi Music Awards	Most Popular Song of the Year	Won
2013		PTC Punjabi Music Awards	Best Non Resident Punjabi Vocalist	Won
2013		Brit Asia TV Music Awards	Best Male Act	Nominated
2014		PTC Punjabi Music Awards	Best Non Resident Punjabi Vocalist	Won
2014	"Feem"	PTC Punjabi Music Awards	Best Club Song of the Year	Won
2014		Brit Asia TV Music Awards	Best Male Act	Won
2014	Best of Luck	PTC Punjabi Films Awards	Best Debut Male	Won
2015		PTC Punjabi Music Awards	Best Non Resident Punjabi Vocalist	Won
2015	"Mitran De Boot"	PTC Punjabi Music Awards	Most Popular Song of the Year	Won
2015		PTC Punjabi Music Awards	Best Duet Vocalists (shared with Kaur B for Mitran De Boot)	Won
2016	Repeat	PTC Punjabi Music Awards	Best Non Resident Punjabi Vocalist	Won
2016	Star Walk (First South Asian)	BC Hall Of Entertainment Fame	Granville Street Vancouver	
2017	Shikaar	PTC Punjabi Music Awards	Best Duet Vocalist	Won
2018		DARPAN Awards	DARPAN Artistic Visionary Award	
2018		100 Year Journey Award	Global Ambassador Award	
2018		PTC Punjabi Music Awards	Best Non Resident Punjabi Vocalist Award	Nominated
2018	"One Million"	PTC Punjabi Music Awards	Best Club Song of the Year	Nominated
2018		PTC Punjabi Music Awards	International Pop Sensation	
2025	"Coolin"	Juno Awards of 2025	South Asian Music Recording of the Year	Nominated
