= Dr Zeus =

British-Indian singer and music producer

Dr. Zeus
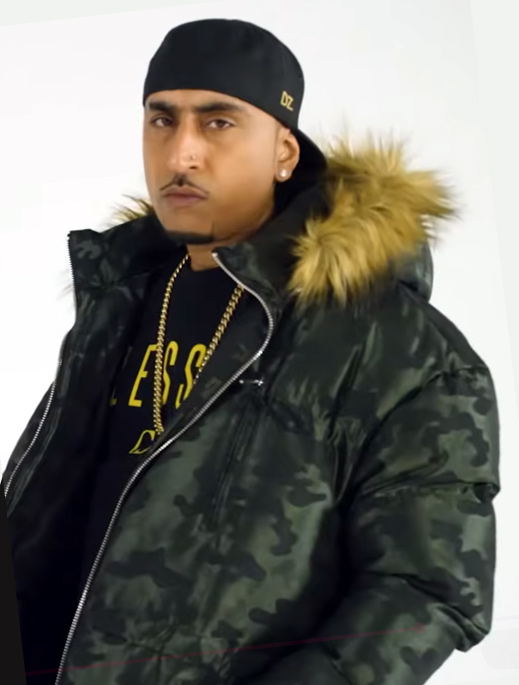
- Dr Zeus in his 2019 single: Tick Tock

Background information
- Born: Baljit Singh Padam
- Genres: Bhangra; Punjabi music
- Instrument: Music
- Years active: 1992–present
- Labels: Envy Entertainment, Deezee Music

Baljit Singh Padam, better known by Dr. Zeus, is a British composer, singer and producer of Punjabi music who has also worked in Indian films. He rose to fame in 2003 with his song "Kangna", which was voted the best song on BBC Asian Network in the same year. His other hits are Don't Be Shy and Jugni Ji. He has collaborated with singer Kanika Kapoor for the song "Jugni Ji" and with musician Jaz Dhami for the song "Zulfa". His song "Aag Ka Dariya" features on the Four Lions film soundtrack. A music video was also produced featuring model Yana Gupta and singers Ravindra & DJ Shortie. In 2017 he collaborated with Snoop Dogg and Nargis Fakhri for Woofer.

== Career ==
Dr. Zeus began his career in 1999 when he signed with the Birmingham based Envy Music Label. There, he produced Pure Garage – Sue My Ass by the Punjabi singer Balwinder Safri, from the band Safri Boyz. He had two songs in this album, which were "Sahiba Bani Prawa Di" and "Par Langa De Veh". A year later, he went on to produce his second complete album Deathjamm 4.5.

Dr. Zeus released his debut solo album "The High Life" in 2001, on the Envy music label. This album featured the vocals of Amar Arshi singing "Gwandian Da Dhol". Dr. Zeus then released Unda Da Influence in 2003. Dr. Zeus released his third album, The Original Edit in 2005 with Lehmber Hussainpuri singing vocals. In 2006, Dr. Zeus released his remix album of greatest hits entitled The Street Remixes. In 2008, Dr. Zeus released an album titled Back Unda Da Influence. The song named "Sat Sri Akaal" hit No.1 on the BBC Asian Network Charts. Dr. Zeus stated on a BBC Asian Network interview that Back Unda Da Influence was recorded exclusively at his own studio (BFK Studio). In January 2011, Manpreet Sandhu's album The Spirit was released with music by Dr. Zeus. In April 2012, he released album Immortal: Nusrat at Kava with songs of Sufi singer Nusrat Fateh Ali Khan in a hip hop style. He has given music for the Punjabi films Daddy Cool Munde Fool and Jatt Boys Putt Jatta De and Hindi film Chaar Din Ki Chandni.

In the 2012 Brit Asia TV Music Awards (BAMA) Dr. Zeus was awarded "Best Asian Music Producer" and "Best Single" for "Jugni Ji", with Kanika Kapoor. In the 2015 BAMA, Dr. Zeus was awarded "Best Producer" and "Bollywood Record of the Year" for "Lovely", again with Kapoor.

== Discography ==
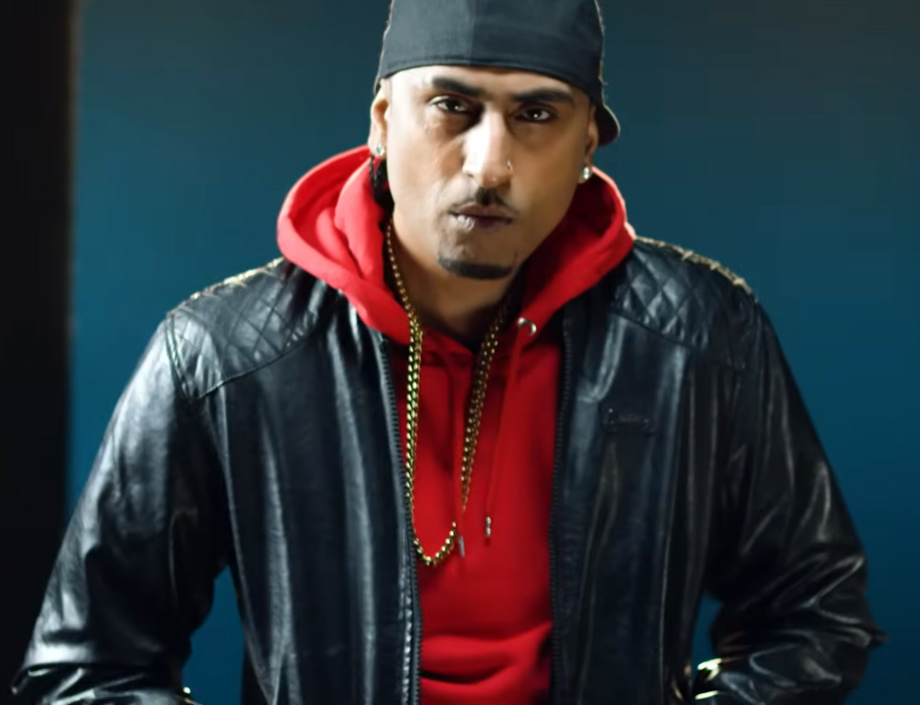
Dr Zeus in his 2019 single: Tick Tock

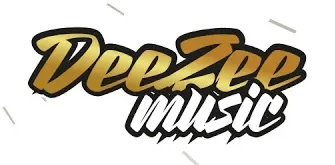
Logo of Dr Zeus's music label, DeeZee

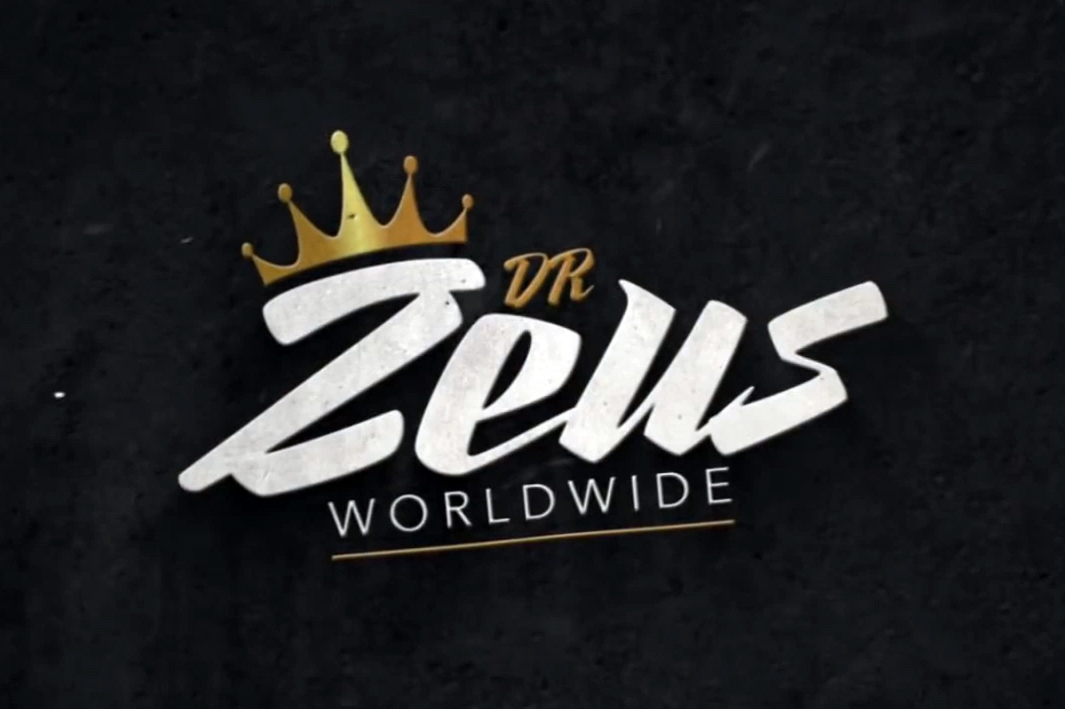
Dr Zeus Worldwide logo

=== Studio albums ===
Album	Release	Featuring artist(s)	Record label
Death Jamm 4.5	1999	Various	Envy/DeeZee Music
High Life	2001	Various	Envy/DeeZee Music
Unda Da Influence	2003	Various	Envy/DeeZee Music/Hom Records
The Original Edit	2005	Lehmber Hussainpuri	Envy/DeeZee Music/B Line Records
The Street Remixes	2006	Various	Envy/DeeZee Music
Back Unda Da Influence	2008	Various	Envy/DeeZee Music/Big Music
Global Injection	2018	Various	BeingU Studios / Sony Music

=== Filmography ===
Year	Film	Release	Artist(s)
2014	Mad About Dance	Punjabi Mundeya	Sung by Ravindra Upadhyay, Lil' Shorty
2014	Happy New Year	"Lovely", "Kamlee"	Sung by Kanika Kapoor, Fateh, Ravindra Upadhyay, Miraya Varma, Dr. Zeus
2015	Dilliwali Zaalim Girlfriend	"Tipsy Hogai"	Sung by Miss Pooja, Rajveer Singh
2015	Ek Paheli Leela	"Desi Look"	Sung by Kanika Kapoor, Dr. Zeus
2015	Second Hand Husband	"Title Track"	Sung by Gippy Grewal
2015	Kis Kisko Pyaar Karoon	"Bam Bam", "Billi Kat Gayee", "Hum Toh"	Sung by Kaur B, Simran Ram, Kapil Sharma, Dr. Zeus; Sung by Ikka Singh, Rajveer Singh, Dr. Zeus; Sung by Kapil Sharma, Kundan Pandey
2017	Machine	"Break Fail"	Sung by Jasmine Sandlas, Rajveer Singh, Ikka
2022	Cuttputlli	"Rabba", "Tu Dis De",	Sung by Sukhwinder Singh; Sung by Hameed Ali Naqeebi
2022	Ram Setu	"Om"	Sung by Krishna Das
2023	Ganapath	"Time 2 Shine"	Sung by Priceless and Roach Killa
2025	Mere Husband Ki Biwi	"Gori Hai Kalaiyan"	Kanika Kapoor, Badshah, IP Singh, Sharvi Yadav, Lata Mangeshkar

== Production discography ==
Album	Release	Artist(s)
Judaa 3 Chapter 2	2024	Amrinder Gill
Judaa 3 Chapter 1	2021	Amrinder Gill
Global Injection	2018	Various
Judaa 2	2014	Amrinder Gill
Rabb Sajna	2014	Aman Sarang
Duniya	2013	Sarbjit Cheema
Twelve	2012	Bilal Saeed
Yaarian	2012	Manpreet Sandhu
Immortal	2012	Nusrat Fateh Ali Khan
Judaa	2011	Amrinder Gill
12 Saal Remixes	2011	Bilal Saeed
The Spirit	2011	Manpreet Sandhu
Zindabaad	2011	G.Sharmilla
The Original Edit	2005	Lehmber Hussainpuri
Death Jamm 4.5	1999	Various Artists
Pure Garage	1999	Balwinder Safri

=== Films produced ===
- 2013: Daddy Cool Munde Fool
- 2015: Kis Kisko Pyaar Karoon
- 2017: Road
- 2019: Laiye Je Yaarian
- 2019: Chal Mera Putt
- 2020: Chal Mera Putt 2 (Artists: Amrinder Gill, Gurshabad) Chal Mera Putt 2
- 2021: Chal Mera Putt 3
- 2025: Chal Mera Putt 4
