= Nachhatar Gill =

Punjabi singer

- Born: Nachhatar Gill
- Genres: Bhangra, Indi-pop
- Occupations: Record producer, musician, music director, singer-songwriter
- Years active: 2001–present
- Labels: MovieBox, United Kingdom; Music Waves, Canada; StarMakers, India

Nachhatar Gill (born Nachhatar Singh Gill) is an Indian musician and singer-songwriter associated with Punjabi music.

== Discography ==
Release	Album	Record label	Music
2017	Putt Sardara De (With Sippy Gill) – Single	MovieBox	Sachin Ahuja
2016	Khabi Khan – Single	Angel Records	Aman Hayer
2016	Vaade Daave – Single	T-Series	Rupin Kahlon
2015	Tere Na Di Mehndi	Amar Audio	Gurmeet Singh
2015	Kaum Sardar – Single	Sony Music	Gurmeet Singh
2015	Khushboo – Single	T-Series	Gurmeet Singh
2014	Lecture La Ke – Single	Angel Records	Money Aujla
2014	Singh – Single	Angel Records	Desi Crew
2012	Branded Heeran	T-Series/Music Waves	Gurmeet Singh
2011	Akhiyan Ch Paani	Kamlee Records/Speed Records	Gurmeet Singh
2010	Teriyaan Jotaan Maa	T-Series	Jatinder Singh-Shah
2009	Chad Ke Na Ja	Kamlee Records/Planet Recordz/Speed Records	Sukshinder Shinda
2007	Naam	Finetouch	Gurmeet Singh
2005	Sun Ve Rabba	Finetouch	Gurmeet Singh
2005	Saadi Gall	Finetouch	Gurmeet Singh
2004	Thaggian	T-Series	Gurmeet Singh
2004	Asi Kita Ae Pyar	Finetouch	Gurmeet Singh
2004	Addi Tappa	SaReGaMa	Gurmeet Singh
2003	Pyar Ho Jauuga	Finetouch	Gurmeet Singh
2002	Ishq Jagaave	Finetouch	Gurmeet Singh
2001	Dass Tere Picche Kyon Mariye	Goyal Music	Gurmeet Singh

=== Film songs ===
Release	Film	Song	Composer	Label	Notes
2021	Puaada	"Pe Geya Puaada"	Happy Raikoti and V Rakx Music	Zee Music Company	
2019	Nanka Mel	Title Track	Preet Sanghreri and Music Empire	Mad 4 Music	

=== Religious ===
Year	Album	Record label	Music
2010	Ardaas Karaan	World Music/Music Waves/StarMakers	Gurmeet Singh
2006	Sahib Jinah Diyan Mane	Finetouch	Gurmeet Singh

== Duo collaboration ==
- Lagda Ishq Ho Gaya 2 – Song: Maa
- Sardari – Music: DNA
- Nain Naina Naal
- Master Saleem – Main Tuta Dil Han Vol 5
- Jaspinder Narula – Desi DJ
- Bhangra Hi Fi
- Dhol Sharabi
- Motivation
- Ajj Dhamalan Paingian
- Mele Diyaan Raunkaan
- Dil Wich Pyar Tera
- Bhangra Smackdown
- Grand Theft Rickshaw
- Pendu Crew Finally Released
- Chakh De Dholia
- Jattan De Munde
- Punjabi Vibes 1
- Desi Top Duet Hits Vol 1
- Vasdi Reh
- Nasha Jawani Da
- Mumtaj Bewafa Ae
- Ik Jindri Hits Of Punjabi Masala
- Dj Virsa Jado Yaad Meri
- Various
- Ultimate Bhangra 06
- Guldasta Geetaan Da
- Dil
- Jashan
- Aao Sare Nachiye
- Zabardast Hits (14 Superhit Songs)
- Dil Wali Peedh
- Paigaam Likhe
- Assi Kita Hai Pyaar
- Bhangra Pulse Vol 2
- Kito Dil Vi
- Various
- Absolut Bhangra 3
- Breakin' The Silence
- Bhangra Hi Fi Vol 1
- Sonu Nigam Breaking The Silence
- Jaspinder Narula Dhol SoundZ Hitz Vol 2
- Aman Statis The Road To Perfection
- Da OcPz Bhangra Intoxicated CD 1
- Dj Playuhh Bhangin Nonstop
- KSR Bhangra Cult 3
- Dj Raju They See Pt 2
- Various Now That Gangsta
- Dj Gugnu Bhangra 4 You Vol 2
- Various Best Of Punjabi Duets Vol 3
- Various Planet Bhangra Vol 3
- Nachattar Gill Gal Dil Te Laggi Ae All Time Sad Hits CD 1
- Nachattar Gill Gal Dil Te Laggi Ae All Time Sad Hits CD 2
- Nachattar Gill Gal Dil Te Laggi Ae All Time Sad Hits CD 3
- Nachattar Gill Gal Dil Te Laggi Ae All Time Sad Hits CD 4
- Various Khotian Kismatan CD 3
- Various Khotian Kismatan CD 5
- Dil Tan Tutde Rehnde Ne
- Thokran
- Dil Wali Peedh Vol 9
- Collaborations 2 (Mul Nai Lagda) Music: Sukshinder Shinda
- Lagda Ishq Hogaya
- Gabroo (Youngster 2)
- 0001 Desi Gun (Khadka Darhka)
- Again 101 Bhangra CD1
- Again 101 Bhangra CD2
- Darda Di Dawa
- Dil Da Dard
- Nach Patlo
- Lad Gaya Pecha
- Ik Ik Pal
- Various Tanhaaiyan CD 1
- Various Tanhaaiyan CD 2
- Various Maahi (My Love)
- Teri Aakh
- Yaara Naal Bahara in 2011 CD-1
- Survivor
- Desi Vibes
- Hit List 2010
- Progressive
- Scooter
- Dance Beat
- The Stars
- Rabba Mereya
- Nacheneh Da Shaunk
- Aappan Pher Milange
- The Missing Part Is You
- Saadi Wakhri Hai Shaan
- Burrraahh
- Living Legend

== Filmography ==
Year	Title	Role	Distribution	Composed	Notes
2015	Jugaadi Dot Com				
2014	Control Bhaji Control				
2012	Kabaddi Once Again	Ranjit			
