= Aman Hayer =

- Also known as: "The Groundshaker" or "The Entourage"
- Born: Amandip Singh Hayer; 5 November 1979 (age 47) Lidhran, Jalandhar, Punjab, India
- Genre: Bhangra
- Occupations: Record producer, music director, singer, songwriter, musician, composer
- Years active: 1998–present
- Label: Elite Music Worldwide

Amandip Singh Hayer (Punjabi: ਅਮਨਦੀਪ ਸਿੰਘ ਹਾਈਯਰ, born 5 November 1979) is a UK-based Bhangra Indian music director and singer. He is known for his albums Reminisce (2003), Groundshaker I (2005) and Groundshaker II (2008).

== Career ==
Hayer has produced seven albums of his own, Deja Vu (2002), Reminisce (2003), Groundshaker (2005), Groundshaker II (2008), Nachdi De EP (2009), Ajj Nachna EP (2011) and The Entourage (2011), and has launched careers of Kulwinder Dhillon, Angrej Ali and Nirmal Sidhu and Benny Dhaliwal.

Aman Hayer now has his own DJ Roadshow called 'The Entourage Roadshow' where he takes many singers from his camp to perform such as Angrej Ali, Sherry Maan, Mangi Mahal, Benny Dhaliwal, Sarbjit Cheema, K S Makhan, Geeta Zaildar, Dev Dhillon, Gippy Grewal and Rasshee Rraga. Currently Aman Hayer Plays the Dhol, Dholki, Tabla, Keyboard and Harmonium.

== Singles ==
Year	Song + Singer	Label	Notes
2023	Spain	T-Series	Singer: Aman Hayer & Music: Deep Jandu
2021	Kanak Diyan Raakhi	MovieBox	Singer: Dev Dhillon
2021	Koi Na Muqabla (From Limited Edition)	Humble Music	Singer: Gippy Grewal
2021	3 More Glassy (Tully) – Groove Productions	Moviebox	Singer: KS Makhan
2020	Fark (From Main Man Album)	Geet Mp3	Singer: Gippy Grewal
2017	Beachballz	MovieBox	Singer: Surinder Shinda
2017	Jatt Jatt Hoju Balliye	MovieBox	Singer: Benny Dhaliwal, Aman Yaar, Surjit Khan
2017	Daaru – Aman Hayer	MovieBox	Singer: Aman Hayer
2017	Sher Punjabi 2	MovieBox	Singer: Nirmal Sidhu
2017	93 Boliyan – Aman Hayer	MovieBox	Singer: Aman Hayer
2017	Lal Camaro	MovieBox	Singer: Geeta Zaildar
2017	Akh Teri Baaz Wargi	MovieBox	Singer: Ammy Virk
2016	Peg Laune Aa (Desi Rockstar 2)	Speed Records	Singer: Gippy Grewal
2014	Takk Ke – Badal ft. Sunny Kailey	MovieBox/Aman Hayer Productions	Singer: Badal ft. Sunny Kailey
2014	Jatt Di Akh – Angrej Ali	MovieBox/Elite Music	Singer: Angrej Ali
2013	"Best Friends – Aman Hayer"	MovieBox / Aman Hayer Productions	Singer: Aman Hayer
2013	"Kasoor – Badal"	MovieBox / Aman Hayer Productions	Singer: Badal
2013	"NERAI HOKAI SUN – NICK SAHOTA"	MovieBox / Elite Music	Singer: Nick Sahota
2012	"The Folk King" (Tribute To Kuldip Manak)	MovieBox Record	Music By Aman Hayer Along with A.S. Kang, Jazzy B, Sukshinder Shinda, Malkit Singh, Manmohan Waris Balwinder Safri & Angrej Ali
2005	Mittran Di Chattri & Pakki Kanak	T-Series	Singer: Babbu Maan From the album "Pyass"

== Discography (Albums & Features on Albums) ==
Release	Album – Singer	Record label
2024	Groundshaker 3	MovieBox & T-Series
2020	Return of THE MAK – KS Makhan	
2020	Ustaad Lok – Benny Dhaliwal	
2015	Dastaar - KS Makhan	Sony Music
2013	Ghora 2 - Benny Dhaliwal	MovieBox/Elite Music
2012	Mulakaat – Dev Dhillon	MovieBox/Elite Music
2012	Diamond Ring - Angrej Ali	MovieBox/Elite Music
2012	Heart Beat 2 - Geeta Zaildar	MovieBox / Speed Records
2012	James Bond 007 – K S Makhan	MovieBox Records/T-Series/Music Waves
2012	Va Vai Va - Benny Dhaliwal	MovieBox/Elite Music
2011	The Entourage	MovieBox/Speed Records/Planet Recordz
2011	Ajj Nachna E.P	MovieBox Records
2010	Desi Rockstar - Gippy Grewal	MovieBox/Speed Records
2010	Good Luck Charm – KS Makhan	MovieBox / Music Waves
2010	Close 2 Me - Geeta Zaildar	MovieBox / Speed Records
2010	Kamli Hoyee - Geeta Zaildar	MovieBox / Speed Records
2009	Nachdi De	Genie Records/Music Waves/Speed Records
2008	Ik Din – Angrej Ali	Moviebox Records
2008	Yaar Mastane - KS Makhan	Genie Records/Music Waves/Planet Recordz
2008	Groundshaker 2	Genie Records/Speed Records/Planet Recordz
2006	Muskaan - KS Makhan	T-Series
2006	2 Much Glassy- Groove Productions	Genie Records
2005	Groundshaker	Genie Records/Speed Records/Planet Recordz
2005	Billo - KS Makhan	T-Series/Genie Records
2005	Genie-Us	Genie Records
2003	Reminisce	Genie Records/Planet Recordz
2003	Changes – Kulwinder Dhillon	Genie Records
2003	Dildar – KS Makhan	T-Series/Genie Records
2002	Rangla Punjab	Genie Records
2002	First Play - KS Makhan	T-Series/Genie Records/MovieBox Records
2002	Glassy - Groove Productions	Genie Records
2002	Deja Vu	Genie Records/Planet Recordz
2001	Turn It Up - Groove Productions	Genie Records
1999	Dark Angel – Amar Arshi	Music World
1998	First Contact – Saabs	Roma II
1998	Desi in Ya Face – Amar Group	DMC Records

== Unofficial albums composed ==
Release	Album	Singer	Label
2010	Jag Jeondeyan De Mele	A.S. Kang	T-Series

== Awards ==
In 2006, he won Best Producer at the UK Asian Music Awards.
