= List of Punjabi films of 2017 =

== Box office ==
Rank	Movie	Production House / Studio	Worldwide Gross (Original)
1	Manje Bistre	Humble Motion Pictures	₹32.50 crore (US$3.4 million)
2	Vekh Baraatan Challiyan	Rhythm Boyz Entertainment Studio, Nadar Films	₹23.90 crore (US$2.5 million)
3	Super Singh	Balaji Motion Pictures, Brat Films	₹20.05 crore (US$2.1 million)
4	Nikka Zaildar 2	Patiala Motion Pictures	₹19.20 crore (US$2.0 million)
5	Lahoriye	Rhythm Boyz Entertainment Amberdeep Productions	₹19 crore (US$2.0 million)

== List of films ==
Opening		Title	Director	Cast	Genre	Producer	Ref
J A N	6	Sardaar Saab	Amit Prasher	Jackie Shroff, Guggu Gill, Daljeet Kalsi, Neetu Singh, Karamjit Anmol	Drama	All Time Movies Pvt. Ltd.	
J A N	6	Yaar Annmulle 2	Sunny Mahal	Raja Baath, Sarbjit Cheema, Sarthi K	Comedy	Batra Showbiz	
J A N	13	Sarvann	KaraanGill	Amrinder Gill, Ranjit Bawa, Simi Chahal	Drama	Purple Pebble Pictures, Pooja Entertainment	
F E B	10	Mahi NRI	Gaurav Bavdankar	Hardy Sandhu, Rameet Kaur, Pappy Jabbal	Comedy/Drama	Firefly Motion Pictures Ranbir Kaloya Productions	
F E B	24	Sargi	Neeru Bajwa	Rubina Bajwa, Jassi Gill, Babbal Rai, B.N. Sharma, Parminder Gill	Comedy/drama	Shri Narotam Films Ltd., Neeru Bajwa Productions	
M A R	3	Dushman	Shagufta Rafique	Kartar Cheema, Jashan Singh, Sakshi Gulati	Action	Yellowstone Productions Pvt. Ltd.	
M A R	10	Jugni Hath Kise Na Auni	Amanjit Singh Brar, Jasbir Singh	K S Makhan, Jagdish Bhola, Drug Mafia	Crime, Drama	Sidhu Films Pvt. Ltd.	
M A R	17	Jindua	Navaniat Singh	Jimmy Shergill, Neeru Bajwa, Sargun Mehta	Drama	Infantry Pictures Ohri Production	
M A R	31	Rabb Da Radio	Tarnvir Singh, Tarnvir Singh Jagpal	Tarsem Singh Jassar, Mandy Takhar, Simi Chahal	Drama	Vehli Janta Films	
A P R	7	Mission 2017 Halla Ho	Manjit Singh Tony, Sarabjit Sidhu	Victor, Satish Kaul, Manpreet Kaul, Gurmit Sajan, Amritpal Billa, Sherry Uppal	Action/Drama	S.S. Batra Production	
A P R	14	Manje Bistre	Baljit Singh Deo	Gippy Grewal, Sonam Bajwa	Drama	Humble Motion Pictures	
A P R	21	Aslee Punjab	Davinder Brar	Nancy Arora, Zafar Khan, Dhiraj Kumar, Davinder Brar, Malkiat Rouni	Drama	Avtesh Brar Production	
A P R	21	Big Daddy World's Best Father	Imran Sheikh	Mohammad Nazim, Sabby Suri, Sartaj Kakkar, Sardar Sohi	Drama	Dwibroo Films, Omjee Groups	
A P R	21	Kawela	Amanjit Singh Brar	Harp Farmer, Mahabir Bhullar, Baljit Mathoun, Mani Kular	Suspense/Thriller	Dogar Wala Khoo Films	
M A Y	5	Arjan	Manduip Singh	Roshan Prince, Prachi Tehlan, Hobby Dhaliwal	Drama	Real World Entertainment	
M A Y	12	Lahoriye	Amberdeep Singh	Amrinder Gill, Sargun Mehta, Yuvraj Hans	Drama	Rhythm Boyz Ent, Amberdeep Productions	
M A Y	26	Saab Bahadar	Amrit Raj Chadha	Jaswinder Bhalla, Sardar Sohi, Ammy Virk, Rana Ranbir	Drama/Thriller/Mystery	White Hill Productions	
J U N	16	Super Singh	Anurag Singh	Diljit Dosanjh, Rana Ranbir, Sonam Bajwa	Superhero/Comedy	Brat Films Production, Balaji Motion Pictures	
J U N	30	Great Sardaar	Ranjeet Bal	Yograj Singh, Nirmal Rishi, Dilpreet Dhillon, Ashish Duggal,	Action, Crime, Drama	Apna Heritage	
J U L	7	Krazzy Tabbar	Ajay Chandhok	Harish Verma, Priyanka Mehta, Yograj Singh, Jaswinder Bhalla	Comedy	A Globe Moviez	
J U L	14	Channa Mereya	Pankaj Batra	Ninja, Amrit Maan, Payal Rajput, Yograj Singh	Romance	White Hill Production	
J U L	21	The Black Prince	Kavi Raz	Satinder Sartaj, Jason Flemyng, Amanda Root, Shabana Azmi	Historical drama	Brillstein Entertainment Partners, Firdaus Production	
J U L	21	Thug Life	Mukesh Vohra	Harish Verma, Jass Bajwa, Rajiv Thakur, Ihana Dhillon	Comedy	Teg Production, Parakeet Entertainment	
J U L	28	Vekh Baraatan Challiyan	Ksshitji Chaudhary	Binnu Dhillon, Kavita Kaushik, Jaswinder Bhalla, Amrinder Gill, Ranjit Bawa, Govind Namdeo	Comedy, Romance	Rhythm Boyz Entertainment, Nadar Films	
A U G	4	Toofan Singh (2017 film)	Baghal Singh	Ranjit Bawa, Shefali Sharma, Yashpal Sharma, Gurcharn Virk, Avtar Gill, Deepraj Rana, Sardar Sohi, Raza Murad, Jarnail Singh, Sunita Dhir, Yaad Grewal, Prince Kamaljit	Drama/Action	Royal Cine Arts	
A U G	18	Rocky Mental	Vikram Thori	Parmish Verma, Tannu Kaur Gill, Mahabir Bullar, Kanika Mann	Drama/Thriller	Dhamrait Films Pvt.Ltd.	
S E P	1	Jora 10 Numbaria	Amardeep Singh Gill	Deep Sidhu, Dharmendra, Sardar Sohi, Hobby Dhaliwal	Crime, Political/Thriller	Bathinde Wale Bai Films, Ohri Productions	
S E P	8	Rupinder Gandhi 2 : The Robinhood	Avtar Singh	Dev Kharoud, Saanvi Dhiman, Jagjeet Sandhu	Drama	Grand Showbiz Media & Entertainment	
S E P	22	Nikka Zaildar 2	Simerjit Singh	Ammy Virk, Sonam Bajwa, Karamjit Anmol, Parminder Gill	Drama	Patiala Motion Pictures	
S E P	29	Kirdar-E-Sardar	Jatinder Singh Jeetu	Nav Bajwa, Raza Murad, Barinder Dhapal, Dolly Bindra	Drama		
O C T	6	Bailaras	Ksshitij Chaudhary	Binnu Dhillon, Ammy Virk, Prachi Tehlan	Drama		
O C T	13	Dramebaaz Kalakaar		Ayan Vaid, Hiten Paintal, Vivaan Arora, Shiraz Khan		Youngers Dream World Production	
O C T	13	Yaaran De Yaar	Ajay Singh	Prince Singh, Mahi Sharma, Aniket Sharma, Mehak Sharma, Satnam Jayee		Jeetu Production	
O C T	20	Dangar Doctor Jelly	Atharv Baluja	Ravinder Grewal	Drama		
O C T	27	Bhalwan Singh	Paramshiv	Ranjit Bawa, Navpreet Banga, Amberdeep		Rhythm Boyz Entertainment Inc.	
N O V	3	Sardar Mohammad	Harry Bhatti	Tarsem Jassar, Mandy Takhar, Karamjit Anmol, Sardar Sohi, Rana Jung Bahadur			
D E C	8	Ik Onkar					
D E C	8	Sat Shri Akaal England	Vikram Pradhan	Ammy Virk, Monica Gill, Karamjit Anmol, Sardar Sohi, Parminder Gill	Comedy/FamilyA	Kuausmedia Entertainment	
D E C	15	Hard Kaur	Ajit Ramsingh	Nirmal Rishi, Diana Utpal, Drishtri Gaurewal	Drama	Delhi Wood Studio Pvt. Ltd.	
D E C	29	Proud To Be A Sikh 2	Satdeep Singh	Amritpal Singh Billa, Atvinder Sungh, Harvinder Singh		Sahn-E-Khalsa	
