= List of Punjabi films of 2011 =

This is a list of Panjabi films of 2011.

== List of films ==
Title	Director	Cast	Genre	Release date (Tentative)	Producer	Ref.
Ek Noor	Mukesh Gautam	Sudhanshu Pandey, Sudeepa Singh, Rajendra Gupta, Bharti Singh (Lalli), Rhyea Sandhu, Dolly Ahluwalia, Rana Ranbir, Sureeli	Drama	4 February 2011	Dr. Ranjeet Chandra	
The Lion of Punjab	Guddu Dhanoa	Diljit Dosanjh, Divya Dutta, Deep Dhillon, Vindu Dara Singh, Ajmer Kainth, Gurpreet Ghuggi, vivek Shauq, Yad Grewal, Parandeep Kainth, Rupinder Kaur, Malkeet Meet	Action	25 February 2011	Tanda Films, Norway	
Canadian Dream	Manmord Sidhu	Vikram Parmar, Preet Cheema, Poonam Sandhu, Kam Dhillon, Balinder Johal, Jasbir Sandhu, Bobby Rai, Devinder Dillon	Gangster	26 March 2011	White Hill Production Inc.	
Dharti	Navaniat singh	Jimmy Shergill, Japji Khera, Raj Babbar, Prem Chopra, Harman Meen, Rahul Dev, Rannvijay, Surveen Chawla	Political Thriller	21 April 2011	Darshan Singh Grewal, Jimmy Shergill	
Jihne Mera Dil Luteya	Mandeep Kumar	Diljit Dosanjh, Gippy Grewal, Neeru Bajwa, Deep Dhillon, Binnu Dhillon, Karamjit Anmol	Romantic Comedy	29 July 2011	Kumar S. Taurani	
Mummy Punjabi	Pammi Somal	Kirron Kher, Kanwaljit Singh, Jackie Shroff		31 August 2011		
Yaara o Dildaara	Ksshitij Chaudhary	Harbhajan Maan, Tulip Joshi, Kabir Bedi, Gulzar Inder Chahal, Jonita Doda, Gurpreet Ghuggi, Gurpreet Kaur, Neena Cheema	Drama	23 September 2011	T-Series, H & H Productions, Aplomb Motion Pictures	
Breakaway	Robert Lieberman	Vinay Virmani, Camilla Belle		23 September 2011		
Yaar Annmulle	Anurag Singh	Arya Babbar, Kajal, Yuvraj Hans, Harish Verma, Jividha, Jenny, Kartar Cheema	Action comedy	7 October 2011	Batra Showbiz private Limited	
Khushiyaan	Tirlok Malik	Jasbir Jassi, Tisca Chopra, Kulbushan Kharbanda, Rama Vij, Deep Dhillon, Shrey Bawa, Vivek Shauq, Gurpreet Ghuggi	Family Drama	14 October 2011	Darshan Garg, D.P. Goyal, Pradeep Bansal	
MLA Natha Singh	Satish Bhakri	Joginder Khurana, Munish Deol, Sheebha Bhakri, Mika, Sambhavna Seth, Raza Murad, Avtar Gill	Comedy	11 November 2011	Tajinder Babbu	
Hero Hitler in Love	Sukhwant Dhadha	Babbu Maan, Mouni Roy, Bhagwant Maan	Punjabi	18 November 2011	B S Maan (Khantmanpur), Darshan Singh Grewal	
I Am Singh	Puneet Issar	Gulzar Inder Singh Chahal, Tulip Joshi, Mika Singh, Sunita Dhir, Puneet Issar, Kavi Raz Puneet Issar		2 December 2011	Monty Sharma, Daler Mehndi, Sukhwinder Singh, Sudhakar datt Sharma	
