= List of Punjabi cinema actors =

List of actors who work in Punjabi film industry

Following is a list of Indian male actors who have worked in Punjabi cinema, the commercial Punjabi-language film industry based chiefly in Mohali. For actresses, please see List of Punjabi film actresses.

The following are some of the most popular Indian punjabi actors of their decades:

Prominent actors of Punjabi cinema across decades

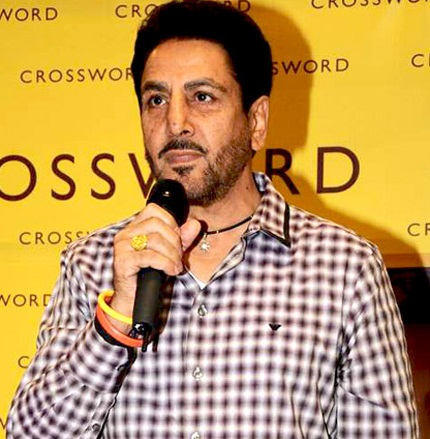
Gurdas Maan (1984s)

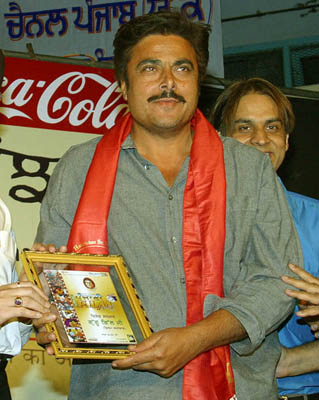
Guggu Gill (1986s)

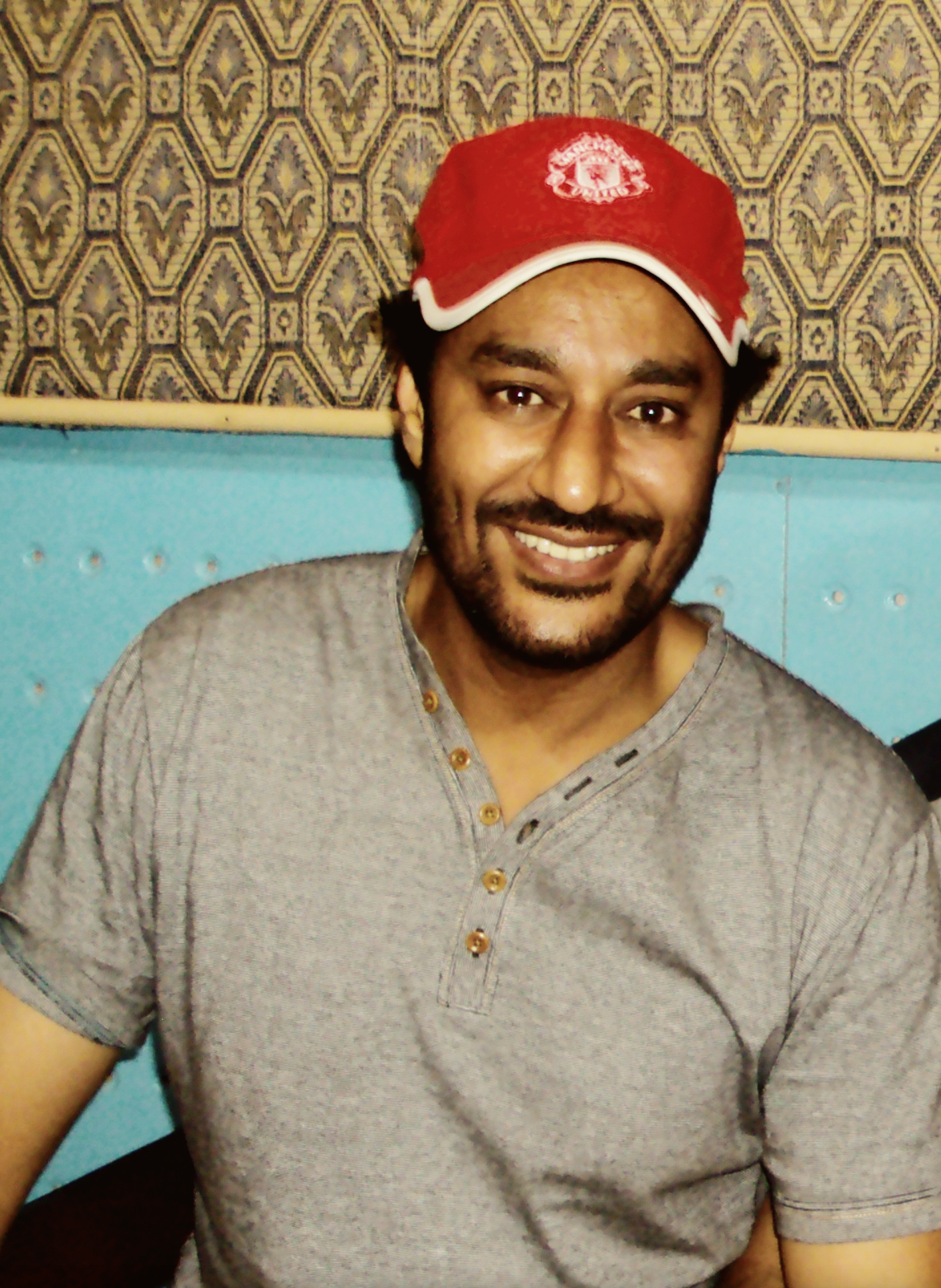
Harbhajan Mann (2002s)

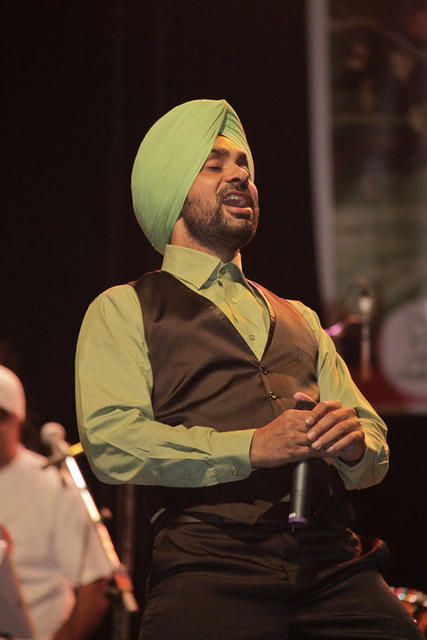
Babbu Maan (2003s)

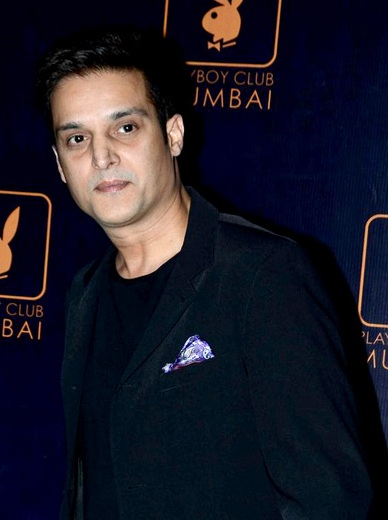
Jimmy Shergill (2005s)

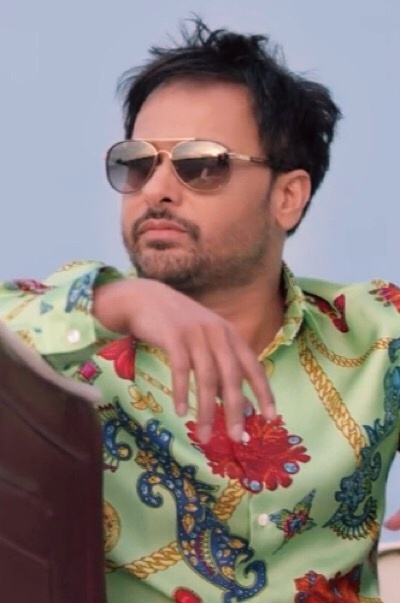
Amrinder Gill (2009s)

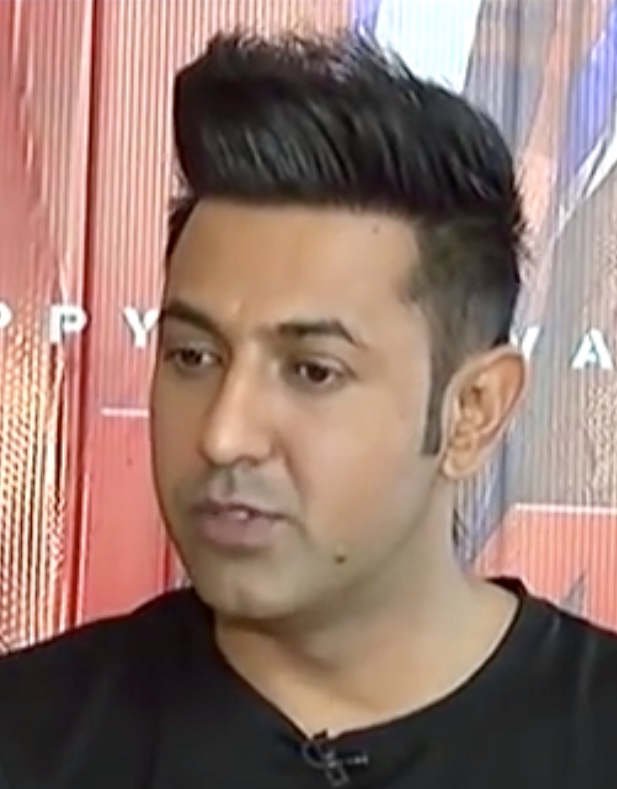
Gippy Grewal (2010s)

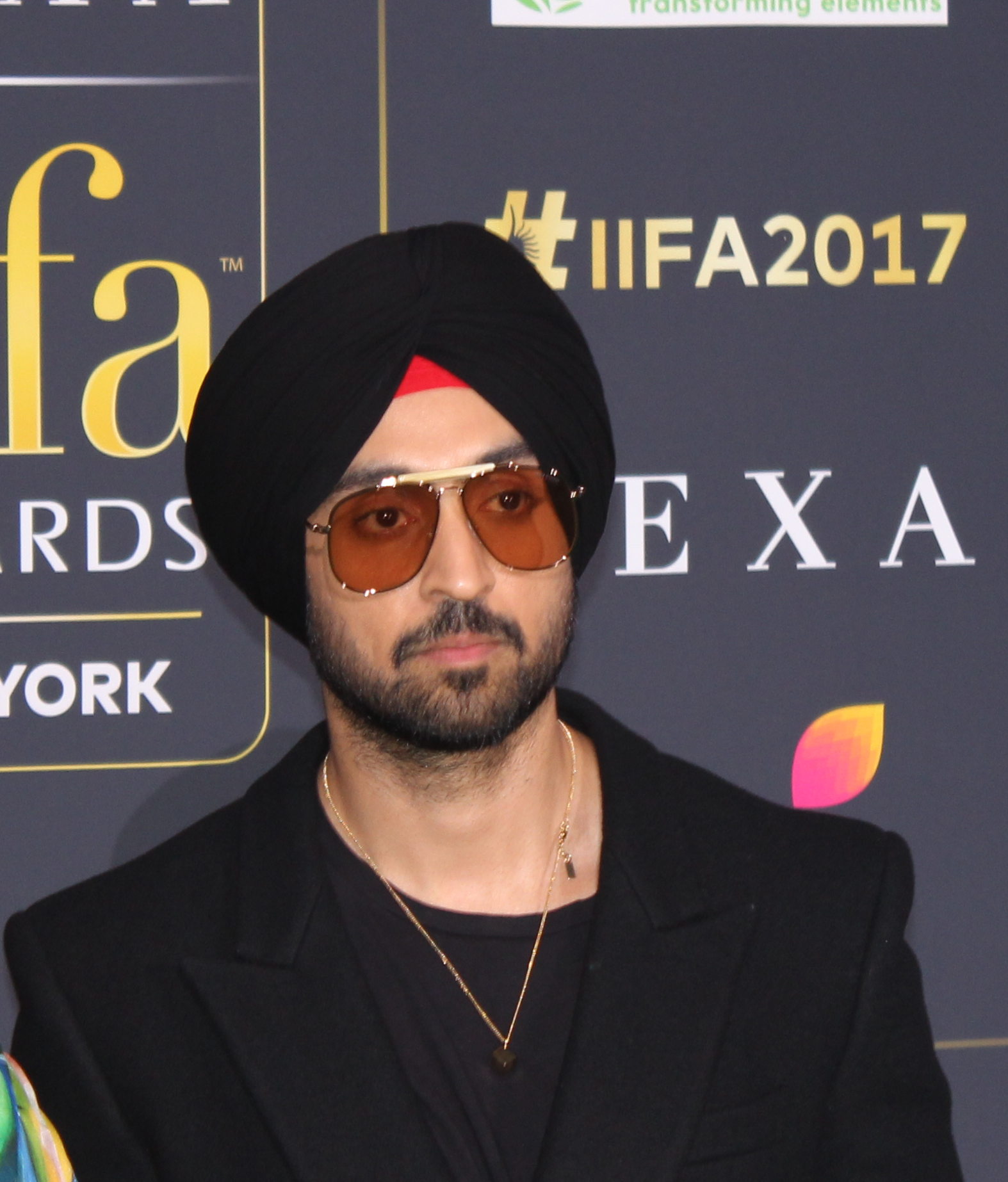
Diljit Dosanjh (2011s)

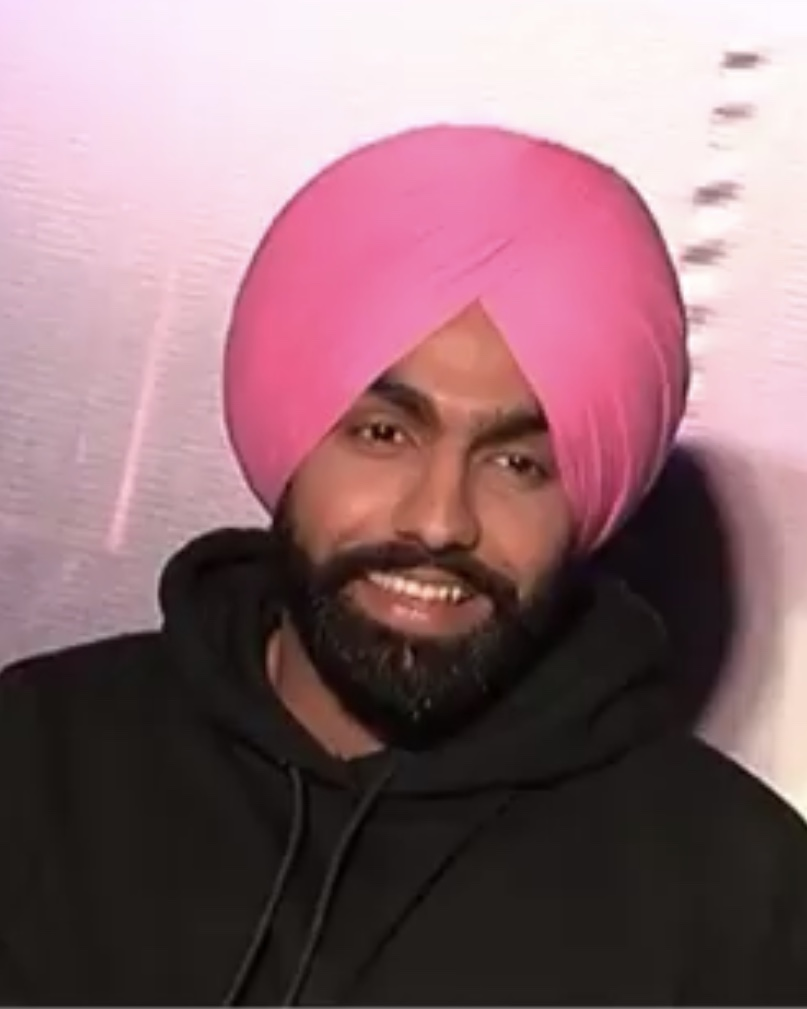
Ammy Virk (2015s)

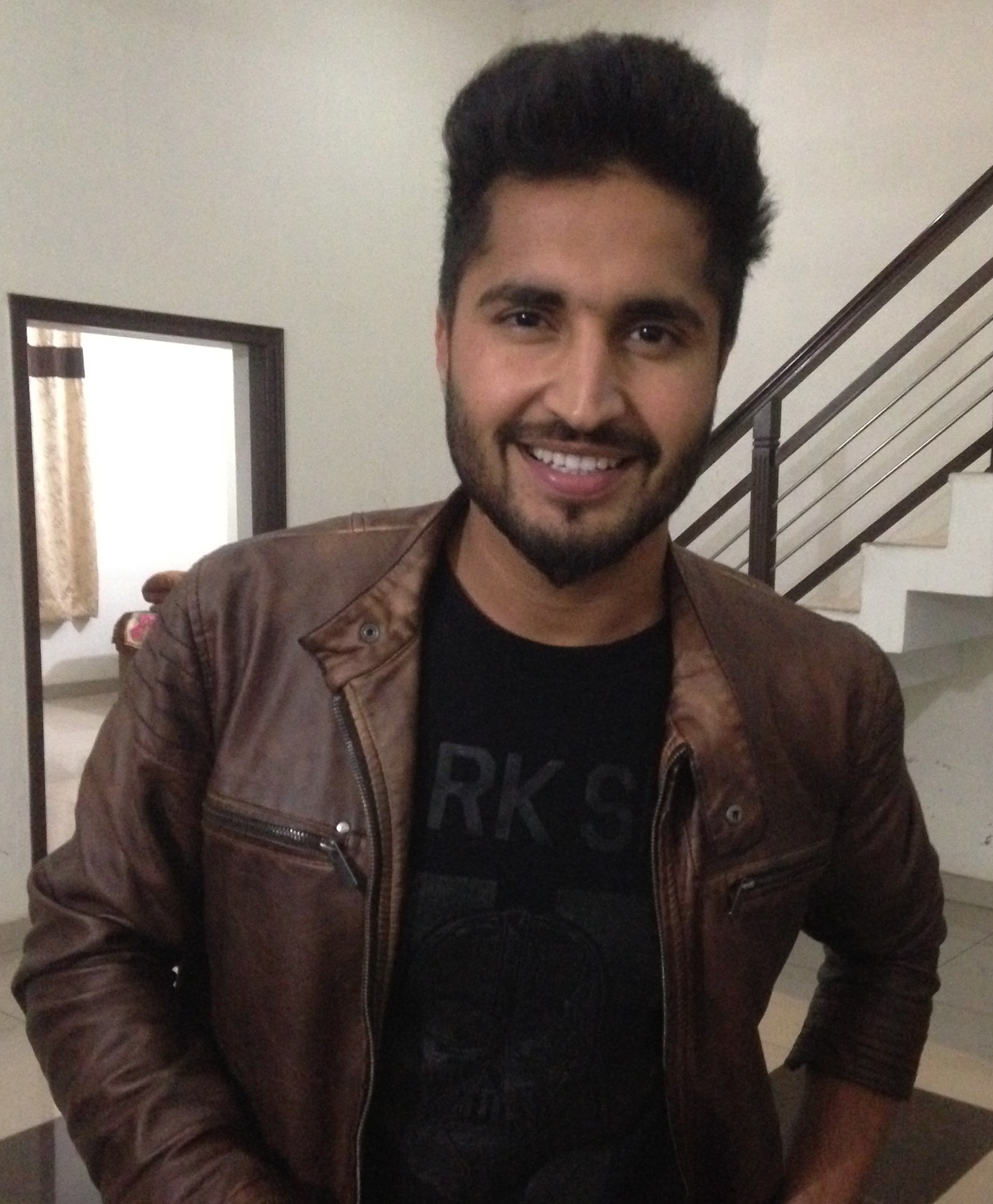
Jassie Gill (2017s)

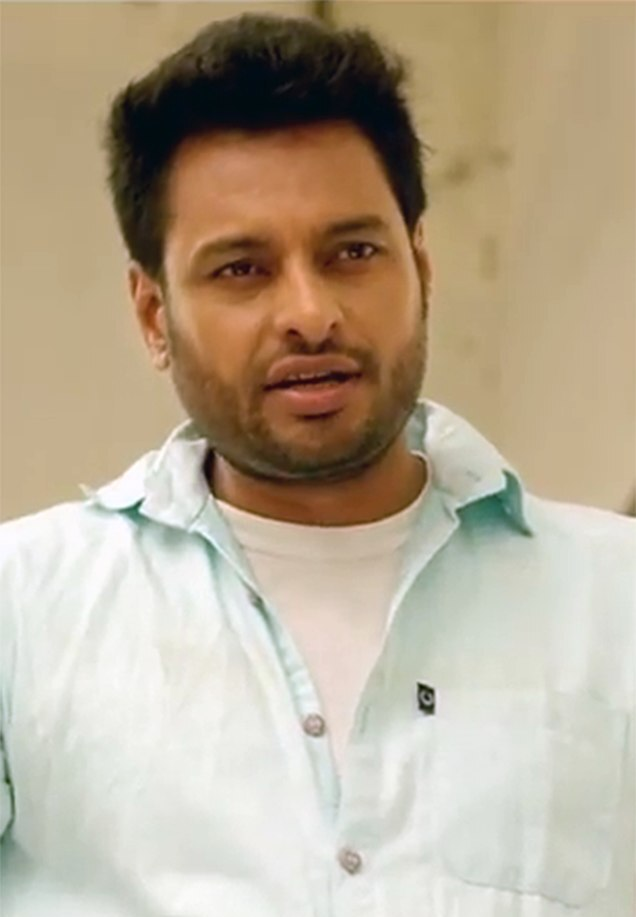
Dev Kharoud (2010s)

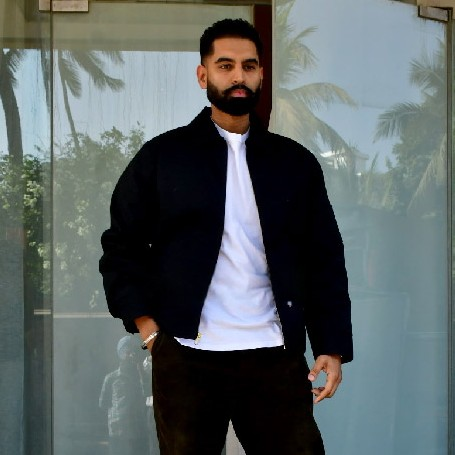
Parmish Verma (2017s)

Actors are listed alphabetically by given name.

== A ==
- Aarya Babbar
- Aman Dhaliwal
- Amberdeep Singh
- Ammy Virk
- Amrinder Gill
- Amrish Puri
- Amrit Maan
- Arjan Bajwa
- Arun Bakshi
- Avtar Gill

== B ==
- B. N. Sharma
- Babbal Rai
- Babbu Maan
- Baldev Khosa
- Balraj Sahni
- Bhagwant Mann
- Binnu Dhillon

== D ==
- Chaman Puri
- David Abraham Cheulkar
- D. K. Sapru
- Dakssh Ajit Singh
- Dara Singh
- Deep Dhillon
- Deep Sidhu
- Dev Kharoud
- Dheeraj Kumar
- Diljit Dosanjh

== G ==
- Garry Sandhu
- Gavie Chahal
- Gippy Grewal
- Gugu Gill
- Gurcharan Pohli
- Gurdas Maan
- Gurkirtan Chauhan
- Gurnam Bhullar
- Gurpreet Ghuggi
- Gurshabad

== I ==
- I. S. Johar

== H ==
- Harbhajan Mann
- Harrdy Sandhu
- Harish Verma
- Harp Farmer

== J ==
- Jackie Shroff
- Jagdish Raj
- Jaggi Singh
- Jaspal Bhatti
- Jass Bajwa
- Jassie Gill
- Jaswinder Bhalla
- Jayy Randhawa
- Jazzy B
- Jeevan
- Jimmy Sheirgill
- Johnny Walker
- Jordan Sandhu

== K ==
- Kanwaljit Singh
- Karamjit Anmol
- Karan Kundrra
- Kulbhushan Kharbanda
- Kapil Sharma

== L ==
- Lakha Lakhwinder Singh
- Lakhwinder Wadali

== M ==
- Madan Puri
- Manmohan Krishna
- Mahendra Sandhu
- Mangal Dhillon
- Mehar Mittal
- Moolchand
- Muhammad Sadiq
- Mukesh Rishi
- Mukesh Tiwari
- Murad

== N ==
- Nav Bajwa
- Navraj Hans
- Ninja

== O ==
- Om Prakash
- Om Puri

== P ==
- Parmish Verma
- Pran
- Prem Chopra
- Prithviraj Kapoor

== R ==
- Ravindra Kapoor
- Raza Murad
- Rahul Dev
- Raj Babbar
- Raj Brar
- Rana Ranbir
- Randhir
- Ranjeet
- Ranjit Bawa
- Ram Mohan
- Ravinder Grewal
- Roshan Prince
- Rajvir Jawanda

== S ==
- Shatrughan Sinha
- Samuel John
- Sarbjit Cheema
- Sardar Sohi
- Sardool Sikander
- Satish Kaul
- Sharat Saxena
- Sharry Mann
- Shashi Puri
- Shavinder Mahal
- Suresh
- Sudesh Lehri
- Singga
- Satinder Sartaaj
- Sunder
- Sunil Dutt
- Surinder Shinda

== T ==
- Tarsem Jassar
- Tiger Joginder Singh
- Trilok Kapoor

== V ==
- Veerendra
- Vishal Karwal
- Vivaan Arora
- Vivek Shauq

== Y ==
- Yograj Singh
- Yuvraj Hans

== See also ==
- List of Punjabi cinema actresses
