= List of Punjabi cinema actresses =

This list outlines the names of popular lead film actresses, who previously worked or are currently working in the Punjabi film industry, based in Mohali, Punjab, India.

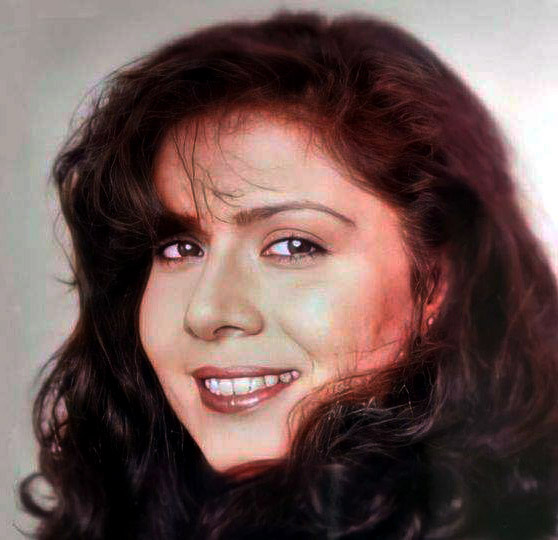
Rama Vij (1977s)

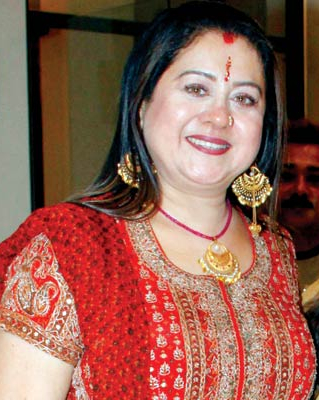
Priti Sapru (1981s)

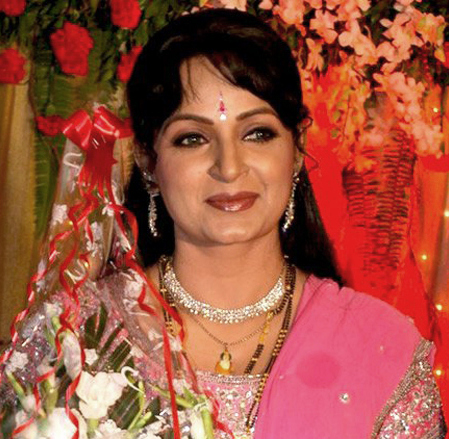
Upasana Singh (1991s)

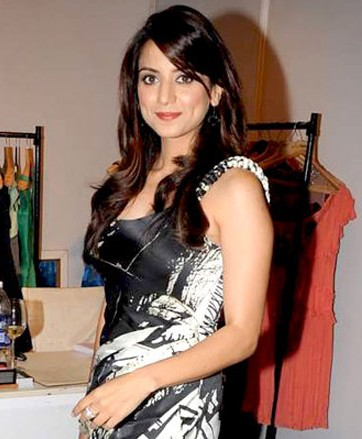
Kulraj Randhawa (2006s)

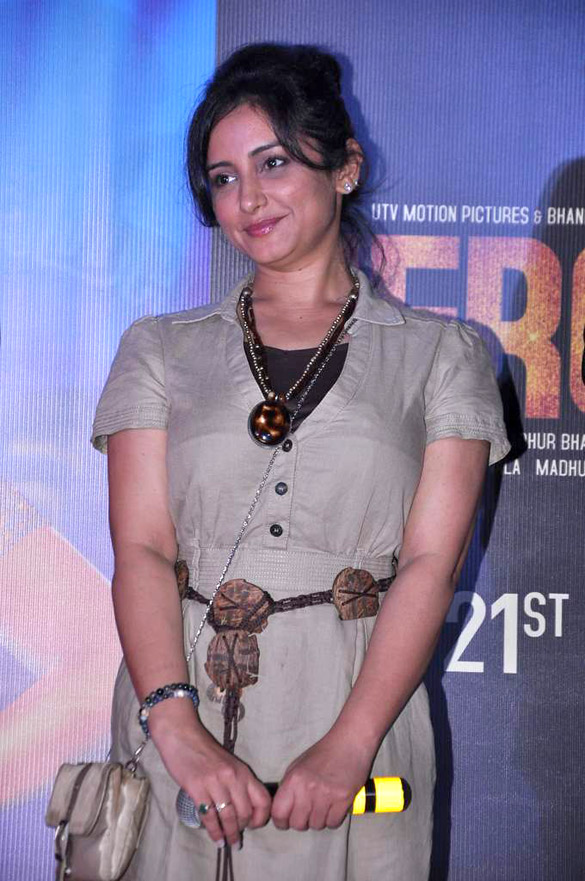
Divya Dutta (1999s)

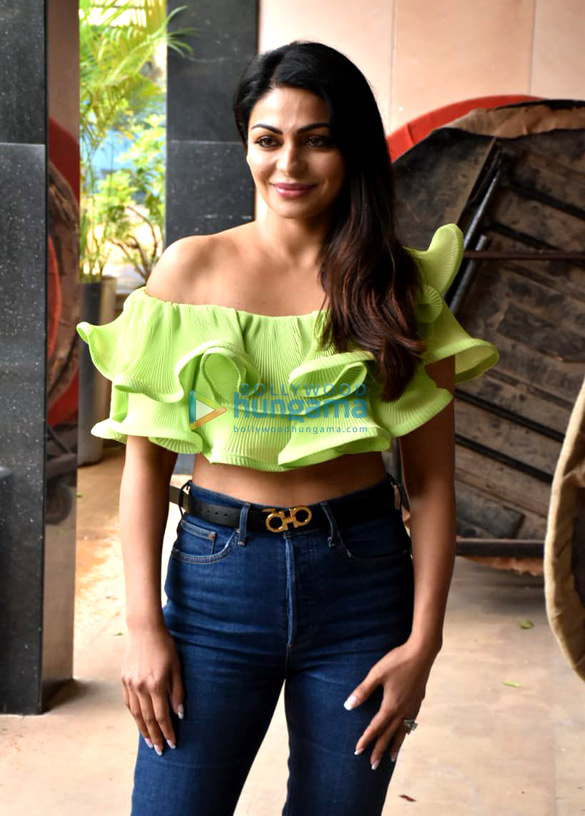
Neeru Bajwa (2002s)

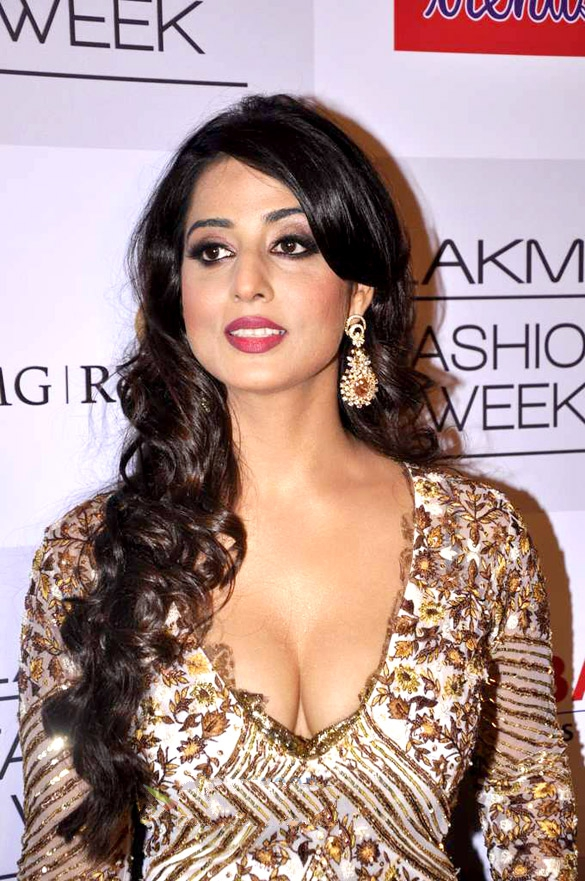
Mahie Gill (2004s)

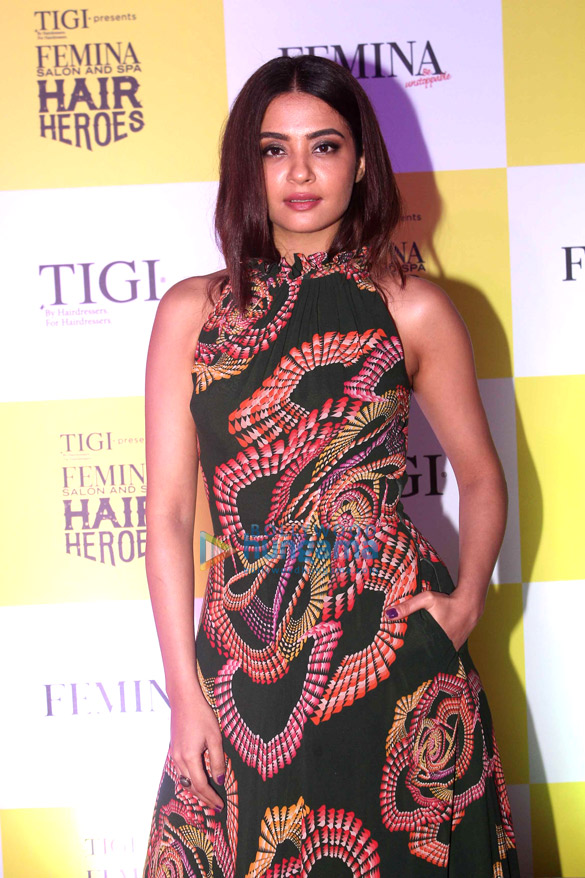
Surveen Chawla (2011s)

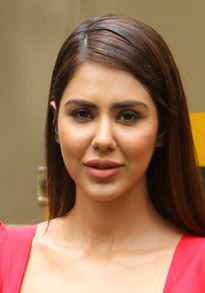
Sonam Bajwa (2013s)

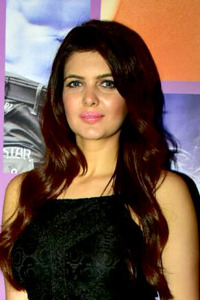
Ihana Dhillon (2013s)

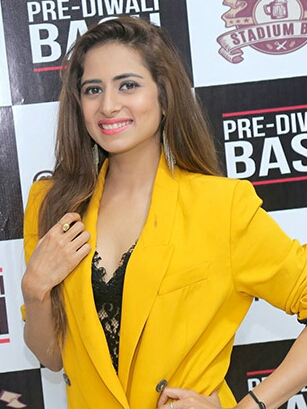
Sargun Mehta (2015s)

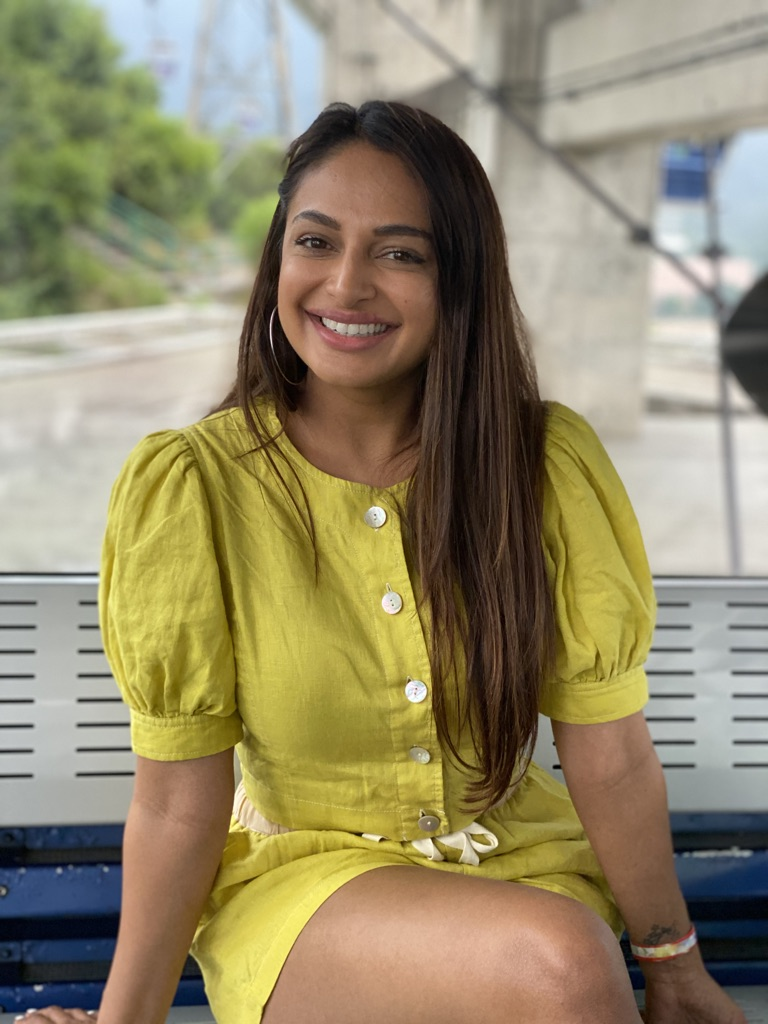
Rubina Bajwa (2017s)

== A ==
- Aditi Sharma
- Amar Noorie
- Asha Saini
- Aarushi Sharma
- Avantika Hundal
- Aarti Chabria
- Amyra Dastur
- Anita Devgan

== B ==
- Bhanu Sri Mehra
- Bharti Singh
- Bhavana Bhatt
- Bhumika Chawla
- Baani Sandhu

== D ==
- Dhriti Saharan
- Diljott
- Divya Dutta
- Dolly Ahluwalia
- Dolly Minhas
- Daljeet Kaur

== F ==
- Farah

== G ==
- Gracy Singh
- Gul Panag
- Gurleen Chopra

== H ==
- Himanshi Khurana

== I ==
- Indira
- Ihana Dhillon
- Isha Rikhi

== J ==
- Japji Khaira
- Jaspinder Cheema
- Juhi Babbar
- Jividha Sharma
- Jasmin Bhasin
- Jasmin Bajwa

== K ==
- Kainaat Arora
- Khushboo Grewal
- Kirandeep Verma
- Kavita Kaushik
- Kul Sidhu
- Kajal Jain
- Kulraj Randhawa
- Kashish Singh

== L ==
- Lauren Gottlieb

== M ==
- Madalsa Sharma
- Madhuri Bhattacharya
- Mahie Gill
- Monica Bedi
- Mandy Takhar
- Manjeet Kullar
- Meher Vij
- Monica Gill
- Miss Pooja
- Mehreen Pirzada

== N ==
- Neelam Sivia
- Neha Pawar
- Navneet Kaur Dhillon
- Neena Cheema
- Neeru Bajwa
- Neetu Singh
- Nisha Bano
- Neha Sharma
- Niharika Kareer
- Nirmal Rishi
- Nishi (actress)
- Noor Jehan
- Nimrat Khaira
- Navneet Nishan

== P ==
- Parminder Gill
- Prachi Tehlan
- Padma Khanna
- Parul Gulati
- Pooja Verma
- Payal Rajput
- Prabhleen Sandhu
- Priti Sapru
- Priya Gill

== R ==
- Radha Saluja
- Rajeshwari Sachdev
- Rama Vij
- Ragini Khanna
- Roopi Gill
- Ritu Shivpuri
- Rupinder Rupi
- Rubina Dilaik

== S ==
- Sakshi Gulati
- Sameksha
- Sapna Pabbi
- Sargun Mehta
- Shiwani Saini
- Shruti Sodhi
- Simi Chahal
- Simran Kaur Mundi
- Smita Patil
- Shehnaaz Gill
- Sonam Bajwa
- Sharan Kaur
- Surbhi Jyoti
- Sidhika Sharma
- Sunanda Sharma
- Surilie Gautam
- Surveen Chawla
- Sanjeeda Sheikh
- Swati Kapoor
- Sara Gurpal
- Sonia Mann
- Shefali Sharma

== T ==
- Tania
- Tulip Joshi
- Tanu Grewal

== U ==
- Upasana Singh

== V ==
- Vimi

== W ==
- Wamiqa Gabbi

== Y ==
- Yuvika Chaudhary

== Z ==
- Zareen Khan

== See also ==
- List of Punjabi cinema actors
