= Munda Hi Chahida =

- Theatrical release poster
- Directed by: Santosh Subhash Thite; Deepak Thaper
- Screenplay by: Santosh Subhash Thite; Deep Jagdeep
- Story by: Santosh Subhash Thite
- Produced by: Neeru Bajwa; Ankit Vijan; Navdeep Narula; Gurjit Singh; Santosh Subhash Thite
- Starring: Harish Verma; Rubina Bajwa; Jatinder Kaur; Pawan Johal
- Cinematography: Jalesh Oberoi
- Edited by: Bharat S Rawat; Yogesh Grover
- Music by: Sandeep Saxena
- Production companies: Neeru Bajwa Entertainment; Shri Narotam Ji Films
- Distributed by: Omjee Star Studios (India); Rhythm Boyz (Overseas)
- Release date: 12 July 2019 (India)
- Country: India
- Language: Punjabi

Munda Hi Chahida is a 2019 Indian Punjabi-language family drama film directed by Santosh Subhash Thite and Deepak Thaper. Co-produced by Neeru Bajwa Entertainment and Shri Narotam Ji Films, it stars Harish Verma and Rubina Bajwa in lead roles. The film was released worldwide on 12 July 2019.

== Cast ==
- Harish Verma as Dharmender
- Rubina Bajwa as Rani
- Jatinder Kaur as Dadi
- Pawan Johal as sister
- Rupinder Rupi as Bhua
- Seema Kaushal as Shopkeeper
- Ravi Aneja as Shopkeeper's husband

== Soundtrack ==
Munda Hi Chahida

Soundtrack album by Gurmeet Singh, Gurmoh and Gurcharan Singh
- Released: 5 July 2019
- Recorded: 2019
- Genre: Feature film soundtrack
- Language: Punjabi
- Label: Jass Records

The soundtrack of the film was composed by Gurmeet Singh, Gurmoh and Gurcharan Singh while background score was composed by Sandeep Saxena. Lyrics were penned by Harmanjeet, Harinder Kaur and Kaptaan.

Track listing
No.	Title	Lyrics	Music	Singer(s)	Length
1.	"Jattaan De Dimag Ghum Gye"	Kaptaan	Gurmoh	Jordan Sandhu Ajay Lobo	3:06
2.	"Kikkaran De Phull"	Harmanjeet	Gurmeet Singh	Mannat Noor	3:21
3.	"Nede Nede"	Harinder Kaur	Gurmoh	Roshan Prince	3:21
4.	"Saza"	Harinder Kaur	Gurcharan Singh	Kamal Khan	4:58

== Release and marketing ==
The film was originally scheduled to be released on 5 July 2019 but was later postponed to 12 July 2019. The film is distributed by Omjee Star Studios in India and Rhythm Boyz Entertainment in overseas. First look poster of the film was released on 14 June 2019 with Harish Verma and Rubina Bajwa in it. Official trailer of the film was released on 18 June 2019 on YouTube by Jass Records.

=== Home Media Release ===
The film is accessible for online viewing on the Chaupal OTT platform.
