= Manoj Sabharwal =

Indian scriptwriter (born 1985)

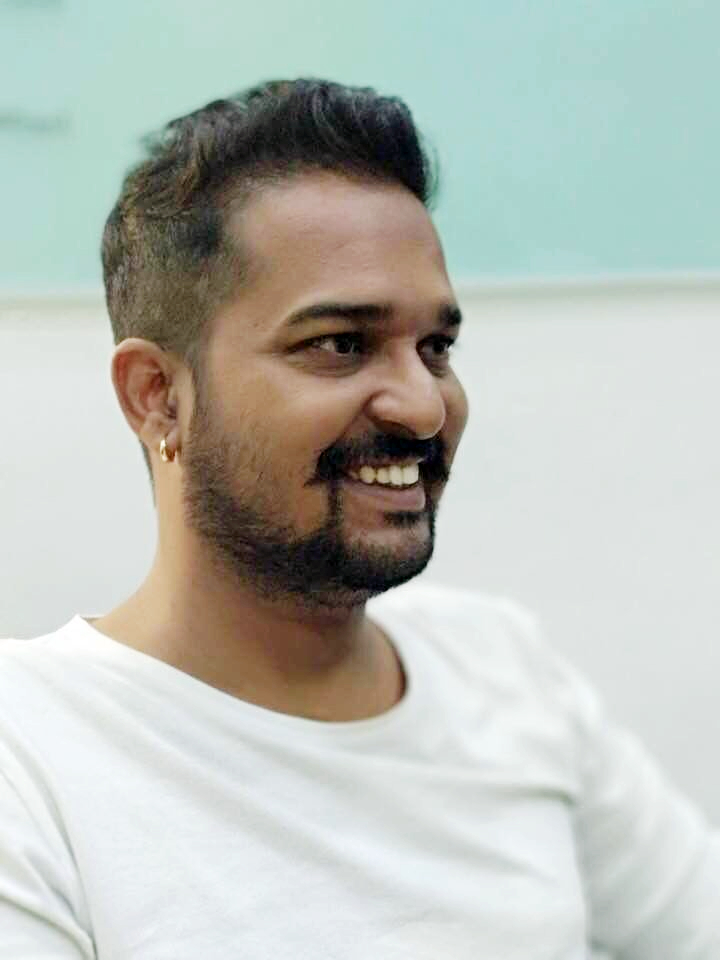
- Sabharwal in 2020
- Born: 6 March 1985 (age 41); Jalandhar, Punjab, India
- Occupations: Scriptwriter; Lyricist; Director; Producer
- Years active: 2009–present

Manoj Sabharwal (born 6 March 1985) is an Indian scriptwriter. He is one of the highest paid scriptwriters in the Indian television industry for non-fiction shows. He is currently producing multiple web series for ott platform and for television. Sabharwal also heads his own production house, Creative Mafia Productions.

== Early life and education ==
Sabharwal was born in Jalandhar, Punjab and he completed his schooling there. Throughout his academic life he was an active participant in theatre and other extra-curricular activities. He attended Apeejay College of Fine Arts, Jalandhar (G.N.D.U).

== Career ==
Sabharwal started his career at DD Punjabi, as a writer for a show called Hasda Punjab. Later he joined DAV College, Jalandhar, as a professional skit director. He moved to Mumbai in December 2010 and joined as an assistant writer at Optimystix Media Private Limited, producers of comedy circus and TV shows.

== Filmography ==
=== Film ===
Film	Year	Credits
Mundeya To Bachke Rahin	2014	Dialogues
Double Di Trouble	2014	Dialogues
Titoo MBA	2014	Dialogues
Mukhtiar Chadha	2015	Dialogues
Yaarana	2015	Dialogues
Canada Di Flight	2016	Dialogues
Din Dehade Lai Jaange	2018	Dialogues
Tara Mira	2019	Dialogues
Vellapanti	upcoming	Screenplay and Dialogues

=== Television ===
TV Show	Year	Credits
Hasda Punjab	2008 (DD Punjabi)	Writer
Comedy Circus	2010–2013 (Sony TV)	Writer
Comedy Nights with Kapil	2013–2015 (Colors TV)	Writer
Funtanatan	2015–2016 (Zoom TV)	Writer
India's Got Talent	2015–2016 (Colors TV)	Writer
Comedy Classes	2015–2016 (Life OK TV)	Writer
Comedy Nights Bachao	2015–2016 (Colors TV)	Writer
Comedy Nights Live	2015–2016 (Colors TV)	Writer
Chhote Miyan Dhaakad	2017 (Colors TV)	Writer
Titoo Da Dhaba	2017 (MH1 TV)	Writer
Comedy Dangal	2017 (& TV)	Writer
Comedy High School	2018 (discovery jeet)	Writer
Entertainment Ki Raat	2017–18 (Colors TV)	Writer
India's Got Talent	2018–19 (Colors TV)	Freelancer gag Writer
Domino's Comedy House	2018–19 (MH One TV)	Writer
Comedy Circus	2018–19 (Sony TV)	Writer
Bharti Ka Show - Aana Hi Padega	2018–19 (Tata Sky Comedy TV)	Writer
Love Me India	2018–19 (& TV)	Gag Writer
Gold Awards	2019	Writer
Zee Rishtey Awards	2019 (Allied Properties, red carpet, curtain raiser)	Writer
Comedy Studio	2019 (Web series for Shemaroo Me app)	Writer/Producer
Saregama Studio	2019 (TV show for Zee Punjabi)	Writer
Bigg Boss 13	2019–2020 (Sunil Grover’s gag)	Writer
Hasseyan Da Halla	2020 (TV show for Zee Punjabi)	Writer
Delnaaz Ki Paathshala	2021	Writer
Hasseyan Da Halla season 2	2021 (TV show for Zee Punjabi)	Writer
Dating Shating Haye Rabba	2021	associate Writer & producer
Hunarbaaz	2022 (Colors TV)	comedy gag writer
Desi Vibes with Shehnaaz Gill	2022 (Youtube)	writer & creative director
The Morning Show	2022 (Watcho app)	writer & producer

=== Web ===
Platform	Title	Year	Credits
paytm insider		2020	mimicry ke superstar-mentor
Amazon Video	Lol-India	2021	Sunil Grover Gags
Yoodlee Films / ZEE5	Oye Makhna	2022	creative producer
Yoodlee Films / ZEE5	united कच्चे	2023	co-producer, writer, lyricist and created by
