= Kashish Singh =

Indian actress and a model

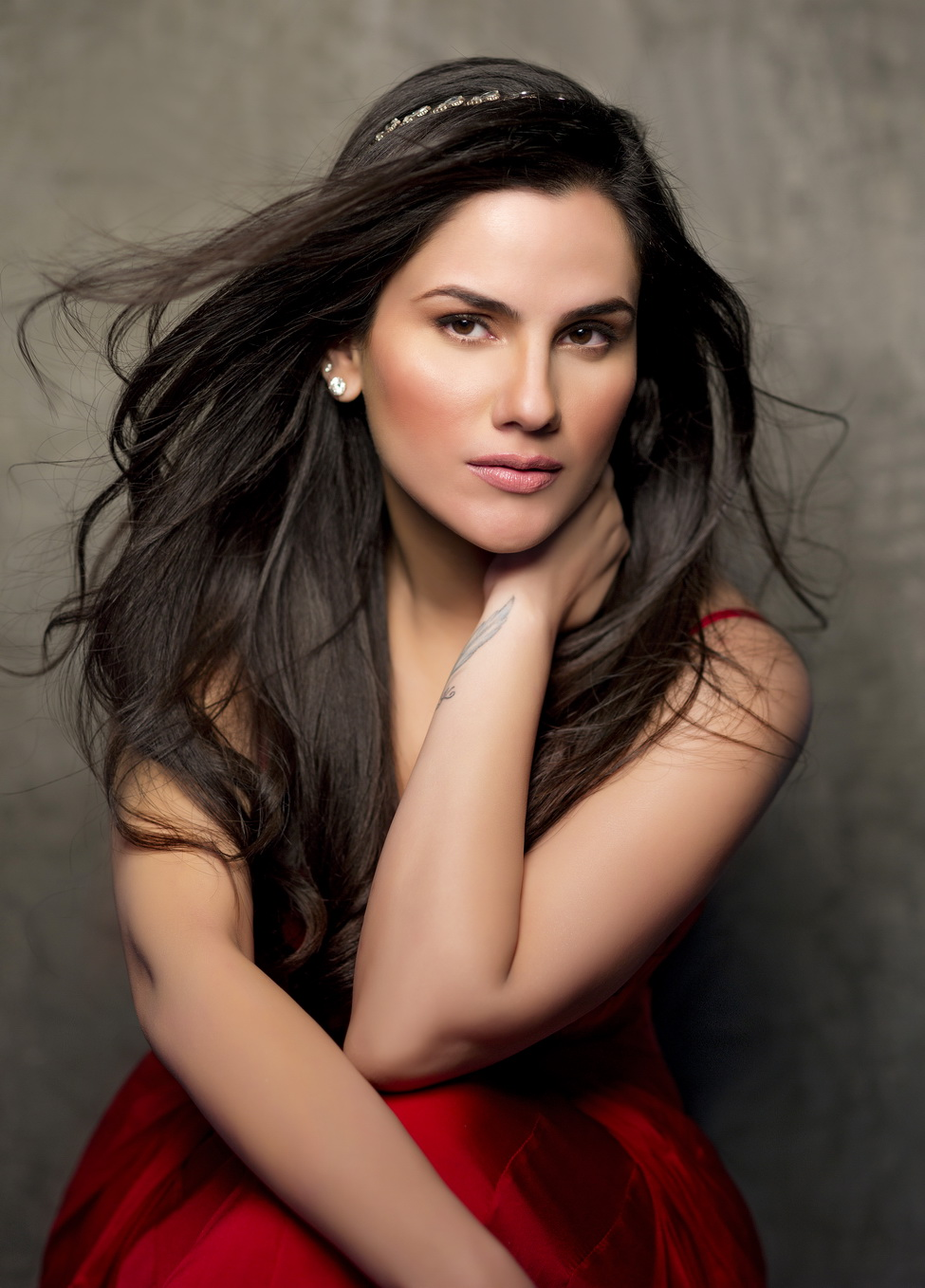
- Occupations: Model, actress
- Years active: 2010 - Present
- Website: iamkashishsingh.com

Kashish Singh is an Indian actress and model. She has appeared in Punjabi and Hindi films.

== Early life and modelling career ==
She was born and brought up in Delhi. Her father is a businessman and her mother is a social worker. She was educated at Delhi Public School and went on to Delhi University.

Kashish completed her acting course from Anupam Kher’s acting academy, Actor Prepares. She went on to feature in various print ads for big brands like Stayfree, Dabur, Fair & Lovely, Siemens, and many more. Kashish has also modelled for domestic and international fashion catalogues.

== Acting career ==
=== Early work ===
In July 2012, she featured in the promotional song of the Punjabi film, Carry On Jatta. She made her feature film debut with Yaarana opposite Yuvraj Hans. Her next success was Vipin Parashar's Punjabi movie Saadey CM Saab opposite Harbhajan Mann.

=== Upcoming projects ===
She has been signed by Tips Industries.

== Magazine covers ==
Kashish Singh has graced several magazine covers like Filmfare in January 2014, Stuff in March 2014, and Femina in May 2014.

== Personal life ==
Kashish is reported to be a style diva, a youth icon and to be involved in charity work. Kashish Singh co-owns the Pro Wrestling League franchise team Jaipur Ninjas.

== Filmography ==
| Year | Film |
|---|---|
| 2012 | Carry On Jatta |
| 2013 | Viyah 70 Km (Kilometer) |
| 2015 | Yaarana |
| 2016 | Saadey CM Saab |
