= Rubina Bajwa =

Canadian actress

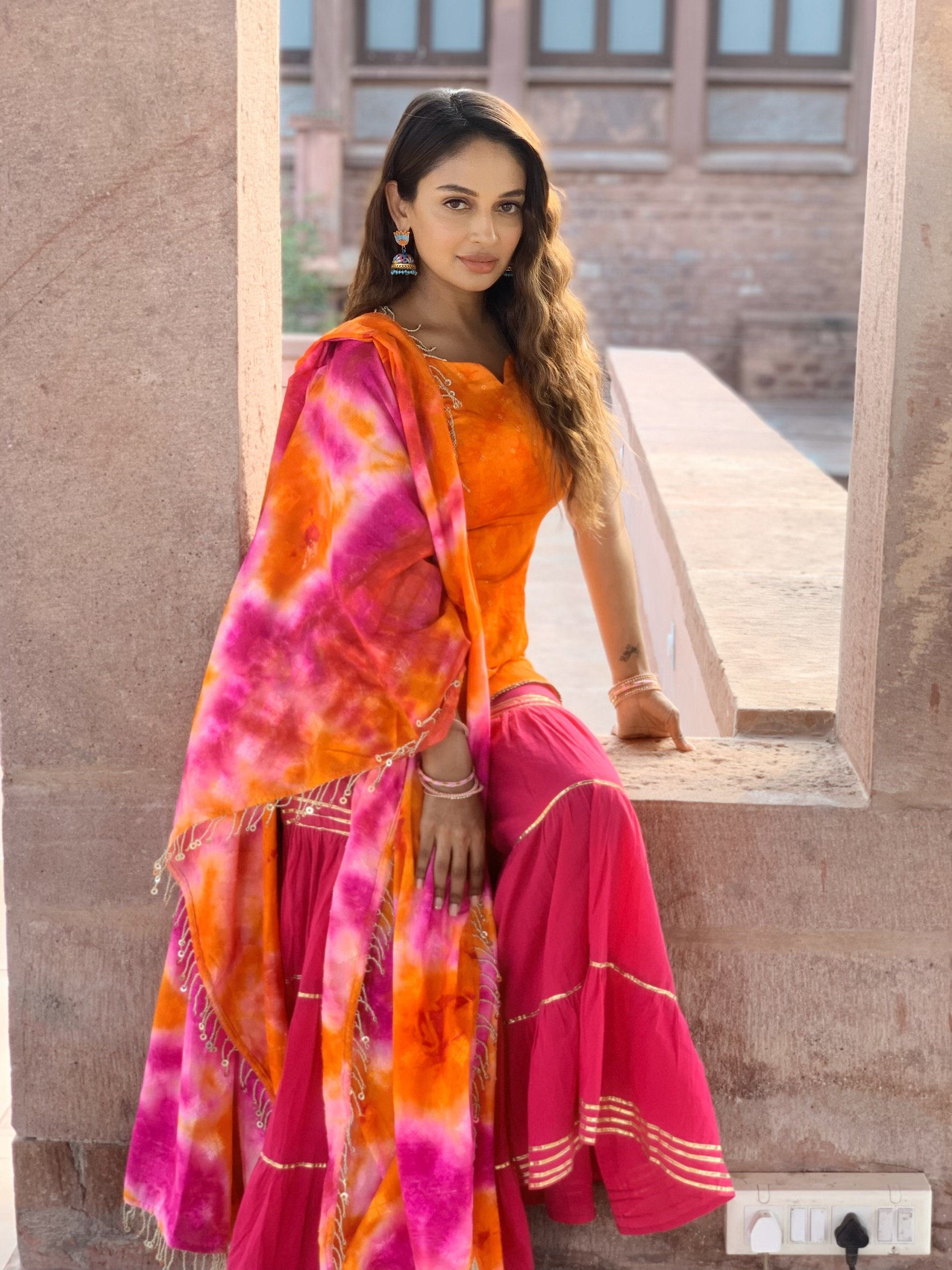
- Bajwa in 2019
- Born: Vancouver, British Columbia, Canada
- Occupation: Actress
- Years active: 2017 – present
- Spouse: Gurbaksh Chahal (m. 2022)
- Children: 1
- Relatives: Neeru Bajwa (sister)
- Website: rubina.chahal.com

Rubina Bajwa is a Canadian actress who works in Indian Punjabi films. The sister of actress Neeru Bajwa, she started her career in 2017 in her sister's film Sargi, for which she was awarded the Debut Female Actress Award in 2018 during the PTC Punjabi Film Awards.

== Early life ==
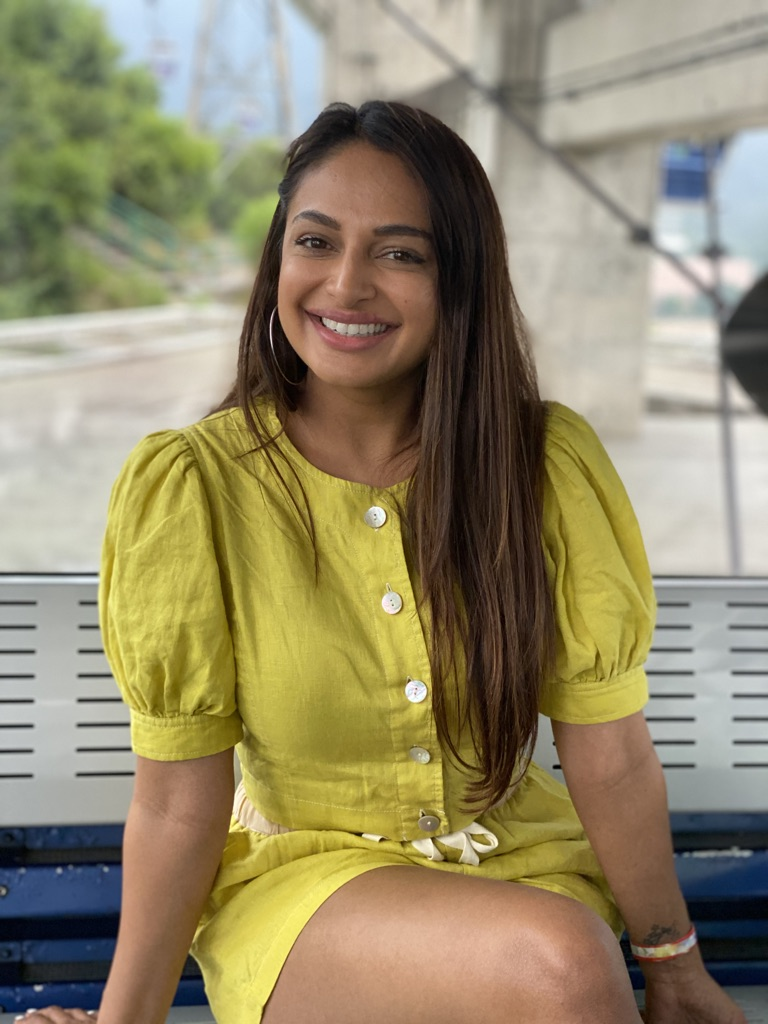
Rubina Bajwa

Bajwa was born in an Indian Punjabi family in Vancouver, British Columbia to Jaswant Bajwa and Surinder Bajwa. She grew up in Vancouver and later came to India to shadow her sister Neeru Bajwa within the Punjabi cinema industry. She has two other siblings, sister Sabrina Bajwa and a brother, Suhail. Rubina completed her acting school at Anupam Kher’s Actor Prepares academy in Mumbai before entering films.

== Career ==
Bajwa started her career in the 2017 Punjabi film Sargi, promoted and directed by her sister Neeru Bajwa. She then appeared in Laavaan Phere along with Roshan Prince in 2018, which received moderate success at the box office and had received mixed reviews by critics.

In 2019, Bajwa appeared in the romcom Laiye Je Yaarian with Harish Verma and in the social satire film Munda Hi Chahida. She also had a role in the film Gidarh Singhi.

In 2021, the romcom Good Luck Jatta, starring Bajwa opposite singer-actor Ninja, was released in cinemas after pandemic delays.

In 2022, Bajwa appeared with her sister, Neeru Bajwa in the film, Beautiful Billo, produced by Neeru's production company, and also appeared in Teri Meri Gal Ban Gayi, directed by Priti Sapru and co-starring singer Akhil.

== Personal life ==
In 2019, Bajwa started dating Gurbaksh Singh Chahal. In July 2022, the couple announced their engagement and their plans to be married in October and on 26 October 2022, they got married in a private Anand Karaj ceremony in Cabo San Lucas, Mexico. Their son, Gurbaksh “Veer” Singh Chahal Jr. was born on 15 November 2024.

== Filmography ==
=== Films ===
Year	Title	Role	Notes
2017	Sargi	Sargi	Film debut
2018	Laavaan Phere	Neetu	
2018	Aate Di Chidi		Special appearance in the song "Mucch"
2019	Laiye Je Yaarian	Jaanpreet "Jaanu"	
2019	Munda Hi Chahida	Rani	
2019	Dil Diyan Gallkan		Special appearance
2019	Gidarh Singhi	Simmi	
2020	Parauneya Nu Dafa Karo	Raavi	
2020	Beautiful Billo	Sonica	
2020	Good Luck Jatta	Preeti	
2022	Beautiful Billo	Sonika	ZEE5 original
2022	Teri Meri Gal Ban Gayi	Guri	
2023	Buhe Bariyan	Kammi	
TBA	Laavan Phere 2	Neetu	Post-production

=== Music video ===
Song	Performer	Year	Ref
"Ve Aivein Taan Ni Rondi Tere Layi"	Babbal Rai	2017	
"28 Kille"	Gippy Grewal	2018	
"Peacock"	Jordan Sandhu	2019	

== Awards and nominations ==
Year	Film	Award Ceremony	Category	Result
2018	Sargi	Filmfare Awards Punjabi	Best Actress, Female Debut	Nominated
2018	Sargi	PTC Punjabi Film Awards	Best Actress, Female Debut	Won
