= Proper Patola (film) =

- Directed by: Harish Vyas
- Written by: Amit Saxena
- Produced by: Deepak Lalwani
- Starring: Neeru Bajwa; Harish Verma; Yuvraj Hans
- Music by: Jassi Katyal & Saurabh Kalsi
- Production company: Country Media Pvt Ltd.
- Distributed by: OmJee Cine World
- Release date: 28 November 2014
- Country: India
- Language: Punjabi

Proper Patola is a 2014 Punjabi romantic comedy film directed by Harish Vyas. The film has an ensemble cast which includes Neeru Bajwa, Harish Verma, and Yuvraj Hans. It was written and co-directed by Amit Saxena. The film was distributed by OmJee Cineworld.

== Cast ==
- Neeru Bajwa as Preet and Jeet (double role)
- Harish Verma as Raj
- Yuvraj Hans as Yuvi

== Marketing ==
The trailer of the film was released on YouTube on 1 November 2014. It was released in cinemas on 28 November 2014.

== Awards ==
PTC Punjabi Film Awards 2015

Pending

- PTC Punjabi Film Award for Best Editing - Gurjant Singh / Vicky Singh
- PTC Punjabi Film Award for Best Screenplay - Harish Vyas / Amit Saxena
- PTC Punjabi Film Award for Best Performance in a Comic Role - Teji Sandhu
- PTC Punjabi Film Award for Best Debut Director - Harish Vyas
- PTC Punjabi Film Award for Best Actress - Neeru Bajwa
