= Aate Di Chidi =

- Theatrical release poster
- Directed by: Harry Bhatti
- Written by: Raju Verma
- Produced by: Charanjit Singh Walia; Tegbir Singh Walia
- Starring: Amrit Maan; Neeru Bajwa; Gurpreet Ghuggi; Karamjit Anmol; Arjun Gupta; Sardar Sohi; Ashlyn J.
- Edited by: Bharat S. Rawat
- Music by: Jaidev Kumar
- Production company: Teg Productions
- Release date: 18 October 2018 (India)
- Countries: India; Canada
- Language: Punjabi

Aate Di Chidi (transl. Bird of dough) is a 2018 Punjabi-language black comedy film directed by Harry Bhatti and starring Amrit Maan, Neeru Bajwa, Gurpreet Ghuggi and Arjun Gupta. The film was released worldwide on 18 October 2018, on the Dussehra festival. It was shot in Canada and Punjab, India.

== Plot ==
Vikram (Amrit Maan), Eliza (Neeru Bajwa), Dilip Singh (Sardar Sohi) and Lavi are a Punjabi family living in Canada. Dilip is the father of Vikram, Eliza is married to Vikram, and Lavi is their son. Eliza doesn't like the fact that Dilip teaches Lavi about Punjabi culture because Lavi is going to live in Canada his whole life. Dilip wants to go to India for a visit, but Eliza has his passport. Eliza's neighbours are a couple with a daughter, and the wife works with Eliza. The wife's Father-In-Law (B.N. Sharma) arrives from India and his son (Gurpreet Ghuggi) doesn't want him to stay here because his wife doesn't want him to. After much pleading, he is allowed to stay. The father-in-law and Dilip talk about how daughters-in-law always disrespect their fathers-in-law. Dilip also has a huge urge to go to India. One day there is a party, and during that party the Father In Law and Dilip make a plan to get Dilip's passport so he can go to India. Eliza finds out and Dilip says the whole family will go to India with me. Just before the flight, the neighbour's daughter asks Lavi for something from India. Lavi says I will give you an 'Aate Di Chidi' (bird made from dough in Punjabi), because the other day Dilip told Lavi how an Aate Di Chidi was the best thing you could get from a Punjabi childhood.

The family arrive in India and Dilip sees things have changed. Dancing at funerals, the impact of social media and much more. Dilip complains that the village sign has the village name written in three languages, and Punjabi is at the bottom. Dilip's other son, (Karamjit Anmol) married a woman from Bihar. Vikram and Eliza want to go and see the city nearby but Lavi says he wants to see the village, due to which Dilip becomes really impressed. Just before going to India, Dilip's friend who is Punjabi as well told him to go to his family's wedding and Vikram's co-worker told him to give his earnings to his parents who live in Punjab as well. The family go to Dilip's friend's wedding, wearing traditional Punjabi clothing. At the wedding venue, the guard stops them thinking they are dancers. A man who is leading the wedding sees Eliza, thinking she is a dancer and calls her in. Eliza and her family sees they are dancing on the stage with guns in their hands and alcohol. Seeing the guns, Eliza dances in fear. After the wedding, Eliza becomes angry at Dilip because Eliza believes Punjab isn't as good as Dilip said to be. Some days later, the family go to Vikram's co-worker's house so that they can receive the money. The co-worker's parents become happy because they can now become financially stable again. However, their spoilt son who lives in Punjab starts arguing with them due to which a huge fight takes place and Dilip's turban falls off.

Dilip then accepts the horrible truth about Punjab and India- it has changed. Eliza then regrets the fact that she tried to prevent her son learning about Punjabi culture. The village sign also then has the name written at Punjabi at the top, telling people that your mother language is the most important. Just before the flight to Canada, Lavi tries to find an 'Aate Di Chidi' as he promised his neighbour's daughter he will get one. He couldn't find it. In Canada, Eliza gives Lavi and the neighbour's daughter an 'Aate Di Chidi', meaning that you can gain knowledge about your culture in other countries as well.

== Cast ==
- Neeru Bajwa as Eliza, a modern women who knows her priorities and managing very well between her job and her family life, except Dilip's wish of wanting to go to Punjab.
- Sardar Sohi as Dilip Singh, aged 65 who has been living with his family in Canada for last 20 years. He has only one dream to see Punjab which he has left long back which he still thinks that it is same as he left long back. Dilip lives with his son Vikram, daughter in law Eliza and grandson Lavi.
- Amrit Maan as Vikram
- Anmol Verma as Lavi
- Ashlyn J. as Saify
- Rubina Bajwa as special appearance in the song Mucch
- Ammy Virk as special appearance in the song Mucch
- Gurpreet Ghuggi
- Karamjit Anmol
- Nirmal Rishi
- B.N. Sharma
- Nisha Bano
- Harby Sangha
- Arjun Gupta as Karan
- Anshu Sawhney as Bihari woman
- Raghveer Boli

== Production ==
The filming of Aate Di Chidi took place between 15 March 2018 and July 2018 in India & Canada. The first portion was filmed in several villages of Punjab, India till 6 May 2018 and the second part was filmed in Canada. The film wrapped on 6 July 2018. Featuring Neeru Bajwa and Amrit Maan, Aate Di Chidi revolves around some serious issues, but the overall tone of the film is comedic. Singer and actor Amrit Maan is featured in his first lead role. It is also Harry Bhatti's first movie in the field of comedy.

== Release ==
A preview of the film was released on 14 March 2018 at Chandigarh. All the major cast members were present at the event. Trailer of the film was released on 21 September 2018 on channel "Lokdhun Punjabi" on YouTube. The film was scheduled to be released on 19 October 2018 but a few days earlier it was announced that the film would be released one day earlier on 18 October 2018. Soon World TV Premiere of this movie on Pitaara TV

== Reception ==
Punjabi website Daah Films said, "Aate di Chidi certainly ends on a very special message for everyone. The film is closely knit with the Punjabi culture and traditions and that has also been made evident from a few songs of the film. This is one of those films that will take you back to the belief that ones's roots are one's own and no matter what, we should always find ways to make ourselves connected with our rich culture and heritage." Also, appreciated the performance of Sardar Sohi in the film.
