= Beautiful Billo =

- Directed by: Santosh Subhash Thite; Amrit Raj Chadha
- Written by: Surinder Angural Rupinder Inderjit
- Produced by: Santosh Subhash Thite; Ashu Munish Sahni; Aniket Kawade; Savin Sarin
- Starring: Neeru Bajwa; Rubina Bajwa; Roshan Prince; Rup Khatkar; Raghveer Boli
- Cinematography: Suresh Beesaveni
- Edited by: Bhaarat S Rawat
- Music by: Aks & S Vee; V Raxx Music; Jay K; Sandeep Saxena
- Production companies: Neeru Bajwa Entertainment; Omjee Star Studios; Sarin Productions
- Distributed by: ZEE5
- Release date: 11 August 2022
- Country: India
- Language: Punjabi

Beautiful Billo is a Punjabi film starring Neeru Bajwa, Rubina Bajwa, Roshan Prince, Rup Khatkar, and Raghveer Boli. The film was directed by Santosh Subhash Thite and Amrit Raj Chadha. It was released on ZEE5 on 11 August 2022.

== Plot ==
The story is based in the UK. It's about a pregnant lady Billo who has secretly moved to stay at recently married Navi's empty house. The chaos starts when Navi's wife Sonika finds out about Billo staying in their house and Navi lies to her to save his marriage. What follows is a lot of drama and a lot of confusion regarding who actually is Billo's husband as everyone thinks someone else is Billo's husband.

== Cast ==
- Neeru Bajwa as Billo
- Roshan Prince as Navi
- Rubina Bajwa as Sonika
- Sukhi Chahal as Balbir
- Baninder Bunny as Bajirao Birmingham
- Rupinder Rupi
- Jatinder Kaur
- Raghveer Boli
- Honey Mattu
