= Kajal Jain =

Indian model and actress

- Born: 10 September 1985 (age 40); Gwalior, Madhya Pradesh, India
- Occupations: Model, Actress, Artist
- Years active: 2008–present

Kajal Jain (born 10 September 1985) is an Indian model and actress. She participated in the Femina Miss India contest in 2008 and was in the top 10 finalist. Kajal represented India at the Top Model of the World contest. She made her screen debut in the Punjabi movie Yaar Annmulle (2011) with Arya Babbar and Yuvraj Hans.

== Career ==
In 2011 Kajal played the lead role in the Punjabi movie Yaar Annmulle (2011) with Arya Babbar and Yuvraj Singh. She then featured in Mere Yaar Kaminey (2013) starring Inderjit Nikku and Karan Kundra and Himmat Singh (2014) with Arjan Bajwa. Along with films Kajal has also appeared in Indian television shows including Buddha, and Sinhasan Battisi. She co-featured with many Bollywood actors in commercials for Samsung, Blue Star, Nokia, Tanishq, Santoor, Hyundai and Cinthol.

== Filmography ==
| Year | Film | Role | Language | Notes |
|---|---|---|---|---|
| 2011 | Yaar Annmulle | Aman | Punjabi | |
| 2013 | Bade Changay Ne Mere Yaar Kaminey | Ranjeeta | Punjabi | |
| 2014 | Himmat Singh | | Punjabi | |
| 2018 | Ekkees Tareekh Shubh Muhurat | Radha | Hindi | |

== Television ==
| Year | Serial | Role | Channel | Notes |
|---|---|---|---|---|
| 2013–2014 | Buddha | Maharani Yasodhara | Zee TV | Lead Role |
| 2014–2015 | Sinhasan Battisi | Maharani Chitralekha | Sony Pal | Lead Role |
| 2015 | Betaal Aur Sinhasan Battisi | Maharani Chitralekha | Sony SAB | Lead Role |
| 2015 | Code Red | Episode 145 | Colors TV | Episodic Role |
| 2015 | Yam Hain Hum | Nandini Shobhavati | Sony SAB | Supporting Role |
| 2016 | Jamai Raja | | Zee TV | Cameo Role |
| 2016 | Bhakton Ki Bhakti Mein Shakti | Maithili (Episode 29) | Life OK | Episodic Role |
| 2017 | Ayushman Bhava | Samaira Vikrant Singhania | Star Bharat | Negative Role |
| 2019 | Tenali Rama | Chitrangada | Sony SAB | Cameo Role |
| 2019 | Namah | Mohini | Star Plus | Cameo Role |
| 2020 | Shrimad Bhagwat Mahapuran | Shurpanakha (Episode 33) | Colors TV | Episodic Role |
| 2020 | Aladdin – Naam Toh Suna Hoga | Mehzabeen | Sony SAB | Cameo Role |
| 2023–2024 | Karmadhikari Shanidev | Devi Parvati | Shemaroo TV | Supporting Role |
| 2024 | Kundali Bhagya | Aliya Malhotra | Zee TV | Supporting Role |
