= Main Solah Baras Ki =

- Directed by: Dev Anand
- Starring: Shaista Usta; Dev Anand; Jas Arora; Deepak Tijori; Neeru Bajwa; A. K. Hangal
- Music by: Rajesh Roshan
- Production company: Navketan Films
- Release date: 7 August 1998
- Running time: 150 minutes
- Country: India
- Language: Hindi
- Budget: ₹1.75 crore
- Box office: ₹27.72 lakh

Main Solah Baras Ki (lit. 'I am sixteen') is a 1998 Hindi-language film directed by Dev Anand. The film is primarily shot in Scotland. The film was unsuccessful at the box office.

== Summary ==
The story portrays Dev Anand as a director who is looking for a new actress to star in his upcoming Bollywood movie. After finding no one in India, he continues his search in Europe primarily the U.K, Canada, and finally, the US, where he finds a teenager Madhu. The story eventually revolves around the love triangle between Suniel, Madhu and Dev Anand.

== Cast ==
- Shaista Usta
- Dev Anand
- Jas Arora
- Deepak Tijori
- Neeru Bajwa
- A. K. Hangal
- Supriya Karnik

== Soundtrack ==
Rajesh Roshan is the film's Music director.

Main Solah Baras ki

Soundtrack album by Rajesh Roshan
- Released: August 1997 (india)
- Genre: Feature film soundtrack
- Label: Shemaroo Entertainment

No.	Title	Singers	Length
1.	"Main Solah Baras Ki"	Alka Yagnik
2.	"Main Pukharoon Aa Bhija"	Alka Yagnik
3.	"Do Dilon Ki Dastan Main"	Anuradha Paudwal, Kumar Sanu & Udit Narayan
4.	"Halchal Machadi"	Udit Narayan
5.	"Sach Huva Hai Sapna"	Kavita Krishnamurthy, Kumar Sanu
6.	"Zindagi Ki Sur Se"	Udit Narayan
7.	"Pal Ye Kahta Hai"	Kavita Krishnamurthy, Kumar Sanu, Udit Narayan & Alka Yagnik
8.	"Jhalak "Lal Badshah""	Unknown Artist
