= Saadey CM Saab =

- Directed by: Vipin Parashar
- Screenplay by: Rajan Khera; Shekhar Gupta; Surmeet Mavi
- Story by: Rahul Kumar
- Produced by: Sumeet Singh
- Starring: Harbhajan Mann; Kashish Singh; Gurpreet Ghuggi; Rahul Singh; Dev Gill(Dev Singh Gill); Inder Bajwa
- Cinematography: Sunita Radia
- Edited by: Protim
- Music by: Avishek Majumder; Goldkartz; Rishi Siddharth
- Production companies: Saga Music; Unisys Infosolutions
- Distributed by: Seven Colors Worldwide
- Release date: 27 May 2016
- Running time: 143 minutes
- Country: India
- Language: Punjabi

Saadey CM Saab is an Indian Punjabi comedy thriller released worldwide on 27 May 2016. Directed by Vipin Parashar, written by Sumeet Singh Manchanda, the film stars Harbhajan Mann, Rahul Singh, Kashish Singh, and Gurpreet Ghuggi. The official first look teaser of the movie was released on 15 March 2016 on SagaHits YouTube Channel.

== Production ==
Saadey CM Saab, produced by Saga Music in association with Unisys Infosolutions, was shot in 60 different location around North India.

== Plot ==
The film centers on three friends who dislike politics, and the problems when one (Harbhajan Mann) becomes chief minister.

== Cast ==
- Harbhajan Mann
- Kashish Singh
- Gurpreet Ghuggi
- Rahul Singh as Inder
- Dev Gill (credited as Dev Singh Gill)
- Inder Bajwa
