= Canada Di Flight =

- Directed by: Roopesh Rai Sikand
- Written by: Roopesh Rai Sikand; Manoj Sabharwal
- Screenplay by: Roopesh Rai Sikand; Manoj Sabharwal
- Produced by: Sunil Pathare; Ajay Makkar; Deepak Choudhary; Tejas Parmar
- Starring: Yuvraj Hans; Navraj Hans; Tarun Mehta; Shobhita Rana; Akriti Bharati; Aanushka Ramesh; Rana Ranbir; Nirmal Rishi
- Cinematography: Madhusudan Shi; John Wilmor
- Edited by: Rohit Dhiman
- Music by: Gurmeet Singh; Jassi Katyal; Altaaf Sayyed
- Production companies: Maxwell Entertainment Pvt. Ltd.; AM Films
- Release date: April 1, 2016
- Running time: 137 minutes
- Countries: India; UK; Canada
- Language: Punjabi

Canada Di Flight (English: Flight To Canada) is a Punjabi-language film directed by Roopesh Rai Sikand, written by Manoj Sabharwal and starring Yuvraj Hans, Navraj Hans, Tarun Mehta, Shobhita Rana, Akriti Bharati, and Aanushka Ramesh as the main cast. It was released worldwide on 1 April 2016.

== Plot ==
Three close childhood friends living in a village in Punjab, Jigar, Harry, and Laddi, decide to immigrate to Canada for a better life and in search of their "dollar dreams." Jigar is a spoiled child of rich parents; Harry is a show-off and bragger; and Laddi aka Phattu is nebbish and clumsy. As they're hanging out in the village, they look upwards in the sky and point to a distant plane saying, "Look... The flight to Canada!" However, their parents are not supportive of their pursuit to settle abroad. The three come across a travel agent, Chawla, who ensures them each a visa and flight to Canada for Rs 1.5 million. They are aware that they won't get this kind of financial support from their parents.

They encounter Minto and Shurli, two men originally from their village and whom the three friends have known since childhood, who are now apparently settled in Canada. Minto alleges that he has worked hard in Canada to become a successful businessman today and invites the entire village for a party later that night. The three friends now get fully charged up for going to Canada. They somehow manage to accumulate the money and give it to Chawla. However, Chawla informs that they need to take a layover in Bangkok for three days and then catch the onward flight to Canada. The three bid farewell to their families and board the plane.

Upon their arrival in Bangkok, they check into a hotel arranged by Chawla. They learn that the hotel is owned by a rich Punjabi businessman, Kabir Gill. The friends notice two girls by the swimming pool of the hotel, and they mistake them for Kabir's sisters. The three get a little anxious as it has been two days and they haven't heard from Chawla. Chawla falsely assures them they will get the tickets the next day; and then he breaks his SIM card and shuts his shop for good. Chawla fails to pay the hotel, and the friends are thrown out after the three days of their stay. As the three friends are now getting frustrated on the streets of Bangkok, a Punjabi garage owner offers them assistance with employment, food and housing. The three now realize that they've become victims of Chawla's scam.

One day, Jigar and Harry capitalize on their visit to Kabir's house for delivering his car from their garage. They intend on getting into relationships with Kabir's "sisters" to receive a share of his enormous property and business. They introduce themselves as rich diamond merchants and begin relationships, Jigar with Roop and Harry with Gurnoor. Laddi meets a Punjabi girl named Sona at a club and the two hook up.

While going around the streets of Bangkok, the three friends spot Minto and Shurli, the two guys from their village who claimed to be living in Canada. The three figure out that Minto is actually a pimp and Shurli his associate. They start blackmailing Minto and Shurli, and quit their garage job. Getting despondent with their demands, Minto and Shurli decide to get the three killed and hire a contract killer, Babbu Don. Shurli informs Laddi about the proposed assassination and demands 7,000 Bath for giving that information. The trio approaches the garage owner for help.

In the meantime, Jigar and Harry have gotten engaged with their girlfriends. Laddi tells the entire series of events to Sona. Jigar and Harry join them and Laddi informs his friends that Sona is, in fact, the garage owner's sister. Roop and Gurnoor follow. The garage owner arrives and Roop and Gurnoor learn that Jigar and Harry work at the garage and are not diamond merchants. Kabir's wife also scolds Roop and Gurnoor that they should be home mopping the floor. Jigar and Harry realize that the girls are not Kabir's sisters but work in houses as maids. The three friends call their mothers and confides that were scammed and are stuck in Bangkok. The mothers advise their sons to return to Punjab. Jigar and Harry reunite with Roop and Gurnoor.

The three men, their girlfriends and garage owner hatch a plan to get rid of the contract killer by kidnapping Kabir's wife. Confusion prevails during the entire kidnapping. Babu Don, Kabir, Minto and Shurli are overpowered as a result and the garage owner suggests that those people should be sent to "no man's land" from where they won't be able to come back.

The film ends in Punjab where the trio are now married to the girls. As their wives get them lunch in the fields, their sons look upwards in the sky and point to a distant plane saying, "Look... The flight to Canada!" but they're chided by their fathers for doing that.

== Cast ==
- Yuvraj Hans as Jigar
- Navraj Hans as Harry
- Tarun Mehta as Laadi
- Rana Ranbir as Babbu Don
- Nirmal Rishi as Mother-in-law
- Akriti Bharti as Gurnoor
- Shobhita Rana as Roop
- Aanushka Ramesh as Sona
- Ramesh Kumar Minto as Minto
- Sanjeev Atri as Shurly
- Rajinder Gill (Shakku Rana) as Kabir Gill
- Ajay Verma as Lovely Pistol
- Rajvinder Kaur as Don's wife
- Vrushali Hatalkar as Mrs. Kabir Gill
- Manoj Sabharwal as Jalebi Waala
- Anand Singh as College Professor
- Gurpal Singh as Bittoo Garage Man
- Santosh Malhotra as Laadi's mother
- Rajinder Rozy as Harry's mother
- Satwant Kaur as Jigar's mother
- Sanjay Makkar as Jigar's father
- Lali Gill as Harry's father
- Lakha Lahiri as Chawla Travel Agent
- Amrit Pal as Sonu Pahalwan

== Soundtrack ==
No.	Title	Lyrics	Music	Singer(s)	Length
1.	"Tension Loka Nu"	Malhi Rachhpal	Gurmeet Singh	Navraj Hans
2.	"Dhol Nagade"	Atiya Sayyed	Altaaf Sayyed	Late Labh Janjua & Altaaf Sayyed
3.	"Drink Chak Lo"	Kumaar	Jassi Katyal	Navraj Hans
4.	"Canada Di Flight"	Kumaar	Jassi Katyal	Navraj Hans
5.	"Naina Waali Gal"	Kumaar	Altaaf Sayyed	Yuvraj Hans & Aaniya
6.	"Kinna Pachhtaunda"	Atiya Sayyed	Altaaf Sayyed	Yuvraj Hans & Aaniya
7.	"Rabba Tuiyon Dass"	Ashok Punjabi	Gurmeet Singh	Navraj Hans
8.	"Nazraan Da Fitoor"	Kumaar	Jassi Katyal	Kunal Ganjawala
