= Sargi =

- Directed by: Neeru Bajwa
- Written by: Jagdeep Sidhu
- Produced by: Ankit Vijan, Navdeep Singh Narula Prem Parkash Gupta, Neeru Bajwa, Santosb Tbite
- Starring: Jassi Gill; Babbal Rai; Karamjit Anmol; Rubina Bajwa
- Cinematography: Lalit Sahoo
- Edited by: Manish More
- Music by: Jay K (Jassi Katyal), B Praak & Gurmeet Singh
- Production companies: Neeru Bajwa Entertainment; Shri Narotam Ji Films
- Release date: 24 February 2017
- Running time: 124 minutes
- Country: India
- Language: Punjabi

Sargi is a 2017 Indian Punjabi language romantic drama film, directed by Neeru Bajwa and starring Jassi Gill, Rubina Bajwa and Babbal Rai. The film was released worldwide on 24 February 2017. The film marked the directorial debut of Neeru Bajwa and the acting debut of her sister, Rubina Bajwa.

== Plot ==
Sargi is a romantic love triangle involving Rubina Bajwa, Jassi Gill and Babbal Rai. The story starts in Punjab where Babbu is shown to be in love with Sargi since childhood but never had the courage to express his feelings. In order to provide a better living for her family, Sargi decides to do a sham marriage with Karamjit Anmol for immigration purposes and moves abroad with him. Unaware, Babbu was left heart broken. Sargi joins a restaurant, whose owner's son kaim, falls in love with Sargi. When Babbu gets to know about Sargi's sham marriage, he also moves abroad and joins the same restaurant in quest to get his love. The game of one-upmanship among Jassi, Babbal and Karamjit begins. Jassi or Babbal, who does Sargi choose forms the rest of the story. The first half sets up the traditional form of romance with Babbu head over heels in love with Rubina but failing to express his feelings. This half is a little slow but has a nice charm. After the Interval, there is a sense of deja-vu with kaim trying to woo Rubina and then the game of one-upmanship amongst the suitors of Sargi.

== Cast ==
- Rubina Bajwa (sargi)
- Jassi Gill (babu)
- Babbal Rai (kaim)
- Karamjit Anmol
- B.N. Sharma (kaim's father)
- Satwant Kaur
- Ginni Kapoor
- Parminder Gill
- Qulfi vines

== Release ==
Sargi was released worldwide on 24 February 2017

== Soundtrack ==
Sargi

Soundtrack album by B. Praak, Jassi Katyal & Gurmeet Singh
- Released: 24 February 2017
- Genre: Feature film soundtrack
- Length: 13:11
- Label: Lokdhun Punjabi

The soundtrack of Sargi was composed by B. Praak, Jassi Katyal & Gurmeet Singh while the lyrics were written by Veet Baljit & Jaani.

Tracklist
No.	Title	Lyrics	Music	Singer(s)	Length
1.	"Fer Ohi Hoyea"	Jaani	B Praak	Jassi Gill	03:52
2.	"Jhumke"	Veet Baljit	Jassi Katyal	Jassi Gill, Babbal Rai & Nimrat Khaira	03:01
3.	"Dil Tuteya"	Veet Baljit	Gurmeet Singh	Veet Baljit	03:13
4.	"Gaddiyan"	Veet Baljit	Jassi Katyal	Babbal Rai	03:05
Total length:					13:11
