= Kawela =

- Punjabi: ਕਵੇਲਾ
- Directed by: Amanjit Singh Brar
- Screenplay by: Amanjit Singh Brar
- Story by: Amanjit Singh Brar
- Starring: Mahabir Bhullar; Baljit Mathoun; Mani kular
- Cinematography: Gagandeep Singh
- Edited by: Abhineet Grover (AGES)
- Music by: Gavy Sidhu
- Production companies: Old Post Office Street Films; Dogar Wala Khoo Films; Harp Farmer Pictures
- Distributed by: Tridev Films
- Release date: 21 April 2017
- Country: India
- Language: Punjabi

Kawela is a 2017 Punjabi psychological thriller movie written and directed by Amanjit Singh Brar and starring Harp Farmer, Mahabir Bhullar and Shehnaaz Gill. The release date of the movie is 21 April 2017.

== Cast ==
Mahabir Bhullar as Inspector Gurjinder Singh Harp Farmer as Inspector Karamveer Singh

== Track List ==
S. No.	Track	Singer	Music	Lyrics
1.	Saadho Re	Rahul Gill	Gurmoh	Sant Kabir
2.	Jalandhar	Angad	Gurmoh	Ulfat Bajwa
3.	Saanjha Wele	Moosa, Poorva Thakur, Glory Bawa, Gurmoh	Gurmoh	Amanjit Singh Brar
4.	Dum Dum	Manraj Patar	Gavy Sidhu	Baba Bulleh Shah and Dr. Surjit Patar
