= Yaarana (2015 film) =

- Directed by: Ranbir Pushp
- Produced by: Sukhbir Sandhar; Ranjana Kent
- Starring: Gavie Chahal; Geeta Zaildar; Yuvraj Hans; Yuvika Chaudhary; Kashish Singh; Rupali Sood; Yashpal Sharma; Dolly Minhas; Puneet Issar
- Cinematography: W. B. Rao
- Music by: Gurmit Singh
- Production companies: Sukhbir Sandhar Films PVT Ltd; Karina Films
- Distributed by: Om Jee Cineworld; VIP Films & Entertainment; Studio 7 Production
- Release date: 24 April 2015
- Country: India
- Language: Punjabi

Yaarana is a Punjabi film directed by Ranbir Pushp. The film is produced by Sukhbir Sandhar and Ranjana Kent. The film stars Gavie Chahal, Geeta Zaildar, Yuvraj Hans, and Kashish Singh in the lead roles. The film was released on 24 April 2015.

== Plot ==
The film revolves around the common sport of football. Football is the one main thing that evokes the emotions of all kinds of people from the communities and colleges of Punjab. The film is set in the Bhai Gurdas Group of Institutes, which has the history and culture of being the best sports college in Punjab.

== Cast ==
- Gavie Chahal
- Geeta Zaildar
- Yuvraj Hans
- Yuvika Chaudhary
- Kashish Singh
- Rupali Sood
- Yashpal Sharma
- Dolly Minhas
- Puneet Issar

== Soundtrack ==
Yaarana

Soundtrack album
- Released: 19 March 2015
- Genre: Feature film soundtrack
- Length: 25:48
- Label: Tips Music

The soundtrack is composed by Gurmit Singh, Gurcharan Singh, and Manoj Nayan.

No.	Title	Music	Singer(s)	Length
1.	"Patola Patna"	Gurmeet Singh, Gurcharan Singh & Manoj Nayan	Geeta Zaildar, Yuvraj Hans	3:17
2.	"Teri Aankh Sharabi"	Gurmeet Singh, Gurcharan Singh & Manoj Nayan	Geeta Zaildar	4:13
3.	"Pillak Pu Baby"	Gurmeet Singh, Gurcharan Singh & Manoj Nayan	Gurmeet Singh	2:44
4.	"Tan Tana Tan"	Gurmeet Singh, Gurcharan Singh & Manoj Nayan	Gurmeet Singh, Yuvraj Hans	4:25
5.	"Tere Khyalan"	Gurmeet Singh, Gurcharan Singh & Manoj Nayan	Yuvraj Hans	3:11
6.	"Tere Nain Mere Nain"	Gurmeet Singh, Gurcharan Singh & Manoj Nayan	Yuvraj Hans Sonika Sharma	4:13
7.	"Dhoom Dhadaka Dhoom"	Gurmeet Singh, Gurcharan Singh & Manoj Nayan	Daler Mehndi	3:01
8.	"Mahi Ve"	Gurmeet Singh, Gurcharan Singh & Manoj Nayan	Tochi Raina	3:37
Total length:				25:48
