= Yaar Annmulle =

- Yaar Annmulle
- Directed by: Anurag Singh
- Screenplay by: Anurag Singh
- Story by: Anurag Singh
- Produced by: Rajan Batra; Vivek Ohri; Tinu Luthra
- Starring: Arya Babbar; Yuvraj Hans; Harish Verma; Jividha Sharma; Jenny Ghottra
- Cinematography: Anshul Chobey
- Edited by: Manish More
- Music by: Gurmeet Singh
- Release date: 7 October 2011
- Country: India
- Language: Punjabi
- Budget: ₹2.7 crore
- Box office: ₹6.2 crore

Yaar Annmulle is a 2011 Indian Punjabi film directed by Anurag Singh. It stars Arya Babbar, Yuvraj Hans, Harish Verma, Jividha Sharma, Kajal Jain and Jenny Ghottra in lead roles. The film was released on 7 October 2011.

== Plot ==
On his first day at university, Sher Singh (Harish Verma) meets his roommate Deep Sondhi (Yuvraj Hans). Their third roommate Guru (Arya Babbar) rudely inspects their belongings. Sher Singh admits he isn't fluent in English. Deep reveals that he's there because it's close to home and his mom.

When Sher and Deep are threatened by ragging (hazing) by Saabu, Guru saves them. Bonding before bed, Sher and Deep agree to make the best of their time at university, particularly looking for girls.

At a lecture, Sher is attracted to the voice of a student, Priyanka (Jenny Ghottra), but mispronounces her name as Prinka. The next girl, Amandeep Kaur Maan (Kajal Jain), is from the same city as Deep. Discussing Amandeep, Sher and Deep attract their teacher's attention, who makes them introduce themselves. Next is Simarpreet Kaur Dhillon (Jividha Sharma), a class topper and confident that she will be again. The teacher reveals that Guru's been failing his class since two years. Guru makes a fool of the teacher.

Later, Sher tries to catch sight of Prinka's face but fails. Again, Sher and Deep are threatened with ragging, but Guru fights off their attackers, but Guru is threatened with rustication. Guru's father berates him for making trouble, and tells him to mend his ways or receive nothing.

Sher and Deep discover that Guru is angry because of a girl. Saabu and his friends beat Guru but Sher and Deep stop the fight. The three roommates bond.

The three guys try to bunk off a lecture but Simarpreet calls the teacher's attention, who throws them out. Sher finally catches sight of Priyanka's face. They become friends.

Simarpreet is top of the class but the three guys receive poor grades. Simarpreet tells them off for not taking any of this seriously. Deep discovers that Guru writes poetry to forget the girl in his past. At the university festival, Deep performs a song based on Guru's poetry, showing the real Guru. Guru runs out, watched by Simarpreet. She apologises to Guru for her behavior and he accepts.

The three boys meet Deep's mom, who reveals that Deep went to school with Amandeep. Deep tells Guru and Sher that he loves Amandeep but he's never told her.

Sher drives Priyanka to a date. When they arrive, she tells him that she's there for her first date with Saabu. Sher was just her ride and they have nothing in common. Sher pines after Priyanka, and Guru reveals to Simarpreet that he feels responsible. But Simarpreet knows that Saabu is cheating on Priyanka, and they engineer Saabu's downfall. Priyanka regrets how she fell for the wrong guy but she didn't finish her final assignment. Sher overhears this. The teacher reveals that Sher was the only one who didn't submit. Sher will have to retake the whole year or leave. Priyanka catches Deep and Guru, looking for Sher. Guru tells her that she didn't deserve Sher's friendship. Priyanka finds him at the train station and apologizes. He forgives her and they get together.

Guru finds Simarpreet and thanks her, but she asks Guru for a relationship. He accepts. When Guru's father discovers them, he asks why Guru is with her. Guru loves her and he wants to marry her. Guru's father wants to know more about her family. Simarpreet agrees but she tells him she loves Guru for his intelligence. She swears that Guru will pass this year as proof of their love.

Deep discovers Amandeep's marriage card, announcing her 'arranged' marriage to a Sikh guy. The guys convince Deep to tell her how much he loves her. She says that she knew, but it's too late. Amandeep's brothers find them and they beat up Deep. Guru and Sher run to Deep's aid but Saabu gets in the way. Guru and Sher eventually defeat him. Delayed, they get to the hospital with Deep's mom. When Deep wakes up, he thanks them but Amandeep is still getting married. Guru says they'll go. At Amandeep's wedding, Deep takes her hand, angering her family. Amandeep's father asks if she loves Deep. She says that she does, so he agrees to their marriage. After the final exams, their results are announced. Amandeep and Deep get the same results, Sher does better than Priyanka, and Guru's father thanks Simarpreet for bringing Guru back to him. Simarpreet offers to improve Guru's marks even further but all that Guru's father wants is to see her as his son's bride.

Two years later, on graduation, the guys reflect on their time at university. When the girls arrive, they pair up and leave for the farewell party.

== Cast ==
- Arya Babbar as Guru
- Harish Verma as Sher Singh
- Yuvraj Hans as Deep Singh Sondhi
- Jividha Sharma as Simarpreet (Simmi) Dhillon
- Jenny Ghottra as Priyanka
- Kajal Jain as Amandeep Maan
- Satwant Kaur as Amandeep Kaur's Mother
- Shavinder Mahal as Guru's father

== Reception ==
It was declared a "hit" by Box Office India.

== Sequels ==
In February 2013, a sequel Yaar Annmulle 2 was announced, set to star the original cast and to be directed by Sunny Mahal. In October 2013, a location video was released on YouTube, now with a cast including Sarbjit Cheema, Sarthi K and Raja Bath. In October 2015 a motion poster was released, the film finally released in 2017.

Poster of the third instalment of the franchise.

Another sequel in this series, Yaar Anmulle Returns released in 2021, with Harish Verma Yuvraj Hans and Prabh Gill. The principal photography had begun on 3 October 2019. The film was scheduled to release on 27 March 2020 but was postponed due to the COVID-19 pandemic. The film was released on 10 September 2021.

The soundtrack of the film was composed by Gurmeet Singh, Pargat Ghumaan and The Kidd whereas lyrics were penned by Happy Raikoti, Raas, Sarab Ghumaan and Raj Ranjodh. The songs are sung by Singga, Himmat Sandhu, Mannat Noor, Ninja, Prabh Gill, Yuvraaj Hans, Kamal Khan, Raj Ranjodh and Vikas.
