= Harp Farmer =

Indian actor, director, producer and photographer

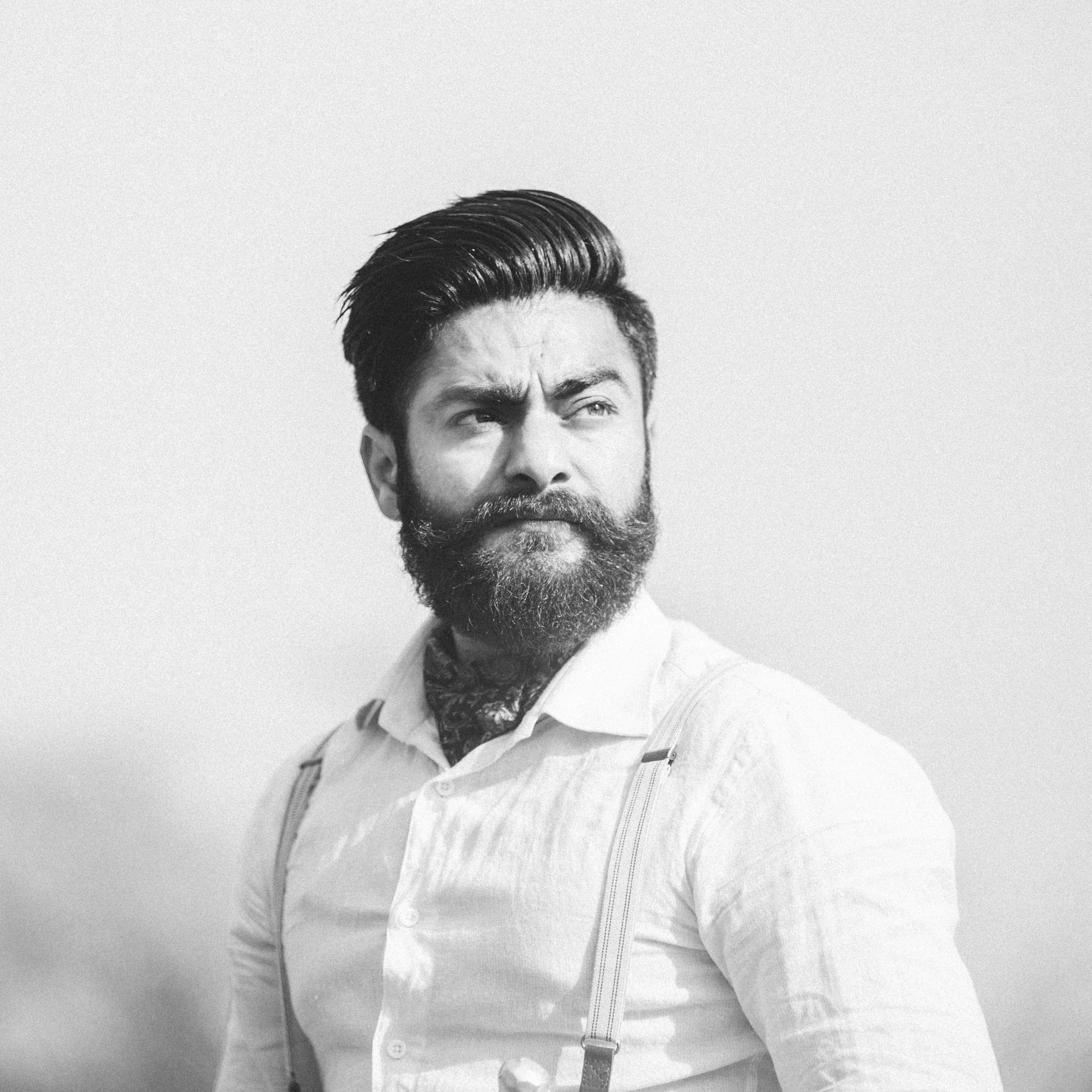
- Born: Harpreet Singh; 6 December 1984 (age 41)
- Occupations: Farmer, Actor, Director, Producer, Photographer
- Spouse: Amber Kaur Farmer
- Website: Harpfarmer.com

Harp Farmer born Harpreet Singh Parmar is an actor, director, producer, and photographer based in Hoshiarpur, Punjab, India.

== Early life and education ==
He completed his higher secondary education from DAV College, Jalandhar and then did his Bachelor of Computer Application from Apeejay College of Fine Arts, Jalandhar and Masters of Science in Advance Software Technology from International Institute of Information Technology, Pune.

== Personal life ==
Harp, born in a Rajput family, is married to Amber Kaur Farmer and the couple has a daughter Sagal Kaur Farmer and son Ajitt Singh Farmer. Family members are Father (Sardar Piara Singh), Mother (Sardarni Darshan Kaur), Harp Farmer, His wife (Amber Farmer) Children Son Ajitt and Daughter Sagal

== Career ==
He started his career as a photographer and his first photography exhibition was organized on 9 April 2012 at Punjab Agricultural University, Ludhiana. Subsequently, three more exhibitions were held, one was at Thakur Art Gallery, Amritsar and the second one at Alliance Française, Chandigarh in the year 2013 and third one that concluded at Kala Bhawan, Chandigarh in June 2016. He is quite famous for his self-portraits depicting farmers of Punjab. Each portrait brings out the simplicity of the rural Punjab. In February 2016, Harp Farmer Pictures released a new song called "Manmaaniyan" composed and sung by Dev Sangha featuring Harp Farmer.

== Filmography/Discography ==
Year	Name	Movie/Song	Role	Language	Notes
2016	Vair	Movie	Fateh	Punjabi	Post-production
2016	Kawela	Movie	Inspector Karamveer	Punjabi	2017
2016	Bambukat	Movie	Cameo	Punjabi	2016
2016	A Day in the World of World Feeder	Movie	Male Lead	English, Punjabi	Docu-Drama by Alex Singh
2016	Crease By Tarsem Jassar Feat. Harp Farmer	Song	Supporting Role	Punjabi	Featuring
2016	Love Marriage Feat. Harp Farmer	Song	Supporting Role	Punjabi	Featuring
2015	Sahaan Varga single by Salina Shelly Feat. Harp Farmer	Song	Male Lead	Punjabi	2015
2014	Shukeen Jatt single by Anmol Gagan Mann Feat. Harp Farmer	Song	Male Lead	Punjabi	2014

== Harp Farmer Pictures ==
He has started his own music record label, under his own production, Harp Farmer Pictures.

Year	Song	Language	Singer
2015–2016	Dildaar	Punjabi	Harmehar Singh
2015–2016	Love Marriage	Punjabi	Jagir Singh
2015–2016	Jatt Brand	Punjabi	Ricky Singh
2015–2016	Meri Boli	Punjabi	Manmeet Bains
2015–2016	All Night	Punjabi	Joe Sekhon

== Controversies ==
In May 2016, Harp started Stop Defaming Punjab campaign which urged people to fight against the propagation that more than 70% of the people of Punjab were into substance abuse in one form or the other. He drew a lot of flak for the campaign and was criticized by those who either had vested interests or had not actually understood the message. He was accused of being a mouthpiece for the ruling party which is thought to be primarily responsible for the widespread usage of drugs in the state. There was much hue and cry criticizing the campaign, though, individuals including renowned artists and a number of NGOs came forward to uphold the cause.

Prior to that, he, along with Ankur Singh Patar had pulled up a cellphone company for using his creation in an unauthorized manner.

In 2020 Farmer was a supporter of the protests by Indian farmers against new farm laws and complained that his image was being used on posters promoting the new laws.
