= Yuvraj Hans =

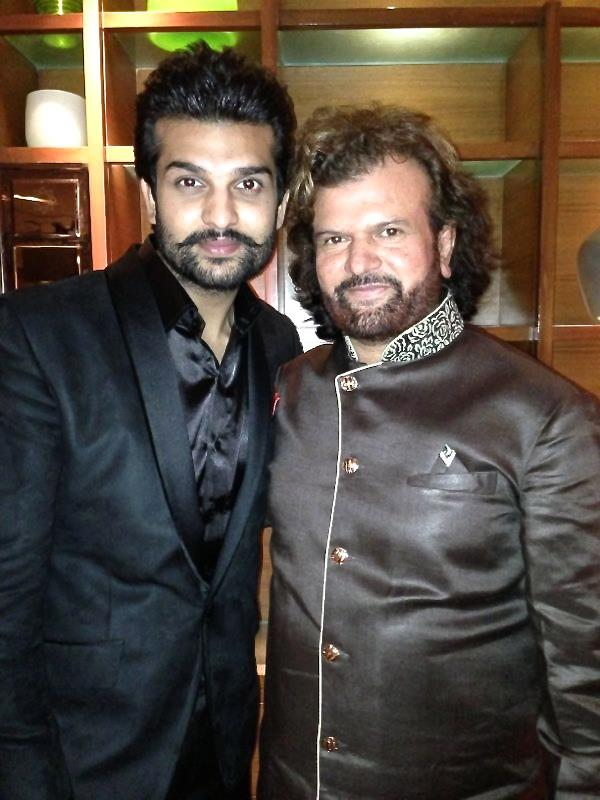
- Yuvraj Hans(left) with father Hans Raj Hans(right)

Background information
- Born: Yuvraj Hans; Jalandhar, Punjab, India
- Genres: Punjabi
- Occupations: Singer; Actor
- Years active: 2011–present
- Labels: Speed Records, MOVIEBOX
- Spouse: Mansi Sharma (m. 2019)
- Website: Facebook Official

Yuvraj Hans is an Indian Punjabi-language actor. He is the son of singer-turned politician Hans Raj Hans.

== Acting career ==
Yuvraj has appeared in two Punjabi feature films. His acting debut was in Yaar Annmulle and was a success. This was followed by Buurraahh, in 2012, but was a failure at the box office.

== Filmography ==
Year	Film	Role	Other notes
2011	Yaar Annmulle	Deep Sondhi	Debut Film
2012	Burrraahh	Jass	With Harish Verma
2013	Viyah 70 KM		Special Appearance
2013	Young Malang	Jazz	
2014	Mr & Mrs 420	Paali	
2014	Proper Patola	Yuvi	with Neeru Bajwa
2015	Yaarana		
2015	Munde Kamaal De	Rocky	an aphonic lover
2016	Canada Di Flight	Jigar	
2017	Lahoriye	Naseem Khan	With Amrinder Gill
2019	Yaara Ve	Neza	With Monica Gill
2020	Jinde Meriye	Yuvi	With Parmish Verma
2020	Yaar Anmulle Returns		
