= Aarya Babbar =

Indian actor

Arya Babbar
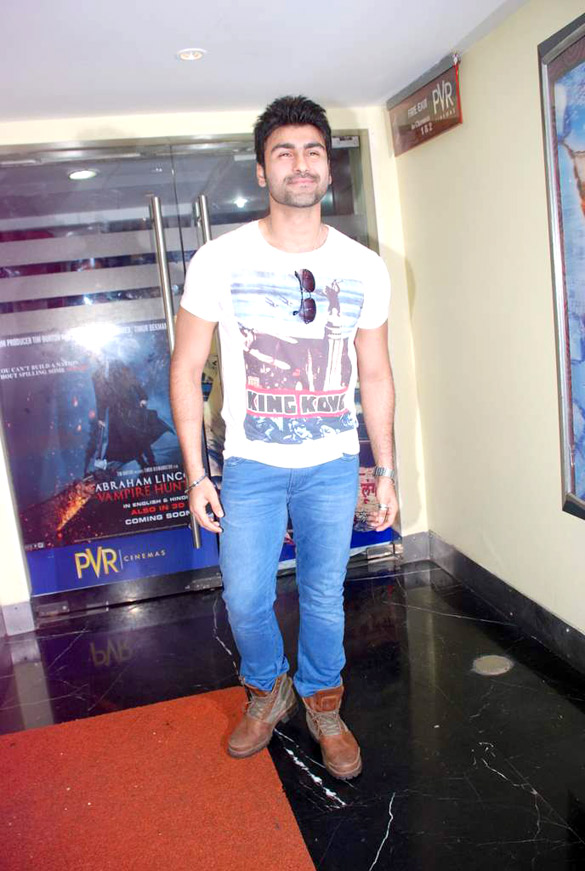
- Born: 24 May 1982 (age 44)
- Other names: Gorky, Sajjad, Aarya
- Occupation: Actor
- Years active: 2002–present
- Known for: Bigg Boss 8 Hai Tujhe Salaam India
- Spouse: Jasmine Puri (m. 2016)
- Parent(s): Raj Babbar; Nadira Babbar
- Relatives: See Babbar family

Aarya Babbar is an Indian actor who appears in Hindi and Punjabi films. In 2014, Aarya participated in the eighth season of Bigg Boss.

== Career ==
Aarya Babbar started his film career with Raj Kanwar's Ab Ke Baras alongside Amrita Rao. He has worked with stalwarts like Mani Ratnam, Madhur Bhandarkar and Vikram Bhatt. Also, he appeared in films such as Yaar Annmulle, Matru Ki Bijlee Ka Mandola and Ready. Aarya Babbar acted in the Bengali film Paapi in 2012, opposite Prosanjit, Pooja Bharti and Sayantika. The Hindi version Paapi released on 11 October 2013. In 2013, he also appeared in the Punjabi movie Heer and Hero, opposite Minissha Lamba.

He was a contestant on Bigg Boss 8, where he managed to survive for 8 weeks and 56 days. Aarya Babbar released his first novel My fiancée, me & #IFu**ed Up on 2 February 2015. He has also written a comic book named Pushpak Viman.

== Awards and nominations ==
He was nominated at the Star Screen Awards in the Most Promising Newcomer - Male category for his film Ab Ke Baras.

== Filmography ==
=== Film ===
Year	Film	Role	Notes
2002	Ab Ke Baras	Karan/Abhay	
2003	Mudda: The Issue	Rajbir	
2004	Thoda Tum Badlo Thoda Hum	Raju	
2007	Guru	Jignesh	
2007	Partition	Akbar Khan	
2008	Chamku	Shreedhar	
2009	Jail	Kabir Malik	
2010	Virsa	Yuvraj Singh Grewal (Yuvi)	Punjabi film
2010	Tees Maar Khan	Inspector Dhurinder	
2011	Ready	Veer	
2011	Aazaan	Imaad	
2011	Yaar Annmulle	Gurveer (Guru)	Punjabi film
2012	Dangerous Ishq	Aarif (Durgham Shah)	
2012	Paapi		Bengali film
2012	Joker	Majnu Tangewala	
2013	Matru Ki Bijlee Ka Mandola	Baadal	
2013	Zindagi 50-50	Addy	
2013	Jatts In Golmaal	Sunny	Punjabi film
2013	Naughty Jatts	Rocky Deol	Punjabi film
2013	Heer and Hero	Fateh	Punjabi film
2014	Ishq Dot Com		
2014	Mushtanda		
2014	Afra Tafri		
2015	Bangistan	Zulfi	
2016	Chalk n Duster	Anmol	
2017	Tera Intezaar	Vikram	
2018	Dassehra	Honey Singh	
2020	Gandhi Phir Aa Gaya	Gandhi	Punjabi film
2022	Hai Tujhe Salaam India	Raquib	
2023	Do Ajnabee	-	-
2024	Hey Siri Ve Siri	-	Punjabi film

=== Television ===
Year	Show	Role	Notes
2014	Bigg Boss 8	Contestant	13th place
2015	Darr Sabko Lagta Hai	Dr. Ashwin Sood	
2016	Sankatmochan Mahabali Hanuman	Dashanan Ravan	
2024–2025	Jagriti: Ek Nayi Subah	Kalikant	

== Personal life ==
Aarya Babbar is the son of actor turned politician Raj Babbar and theatre personality Nadira Babbar. He has one elder sister, the actress Juhi Babbar, whose husband is the actor Anup Soni. Aarya also has a half-brother, Prateik Babbar, who is the son of Raj Babbar by his second wife Smita Patil. Through his mother Nadira Babbar (born Nadira Zaheer), Aarya is the grandson of the communist activist Sajjad Zaheer and the first cousin of Pankhuri Zaheer. On 22 Feb 2016, Aarya married his girlfriend Jasmine Puri in a traditional Sikh wedding ceremony. Jasmine is reported to be employed at a major film production house.
