= Neeru Bajwa =

Canadian actress (born 1980)

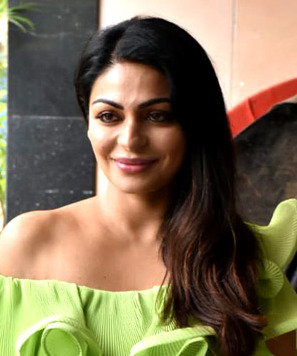
- Bajwa promoting Shadaa in 2019
- Born: 26 August 1980 (age 46); Surrey, British Columbia, Canada
- Occupations: Actress; director; producer
- Years active: 1998–present
- Spouse: Harry Jawandha (m. 2015)
- Children: 3
- Relatives: Rubina Bajwa (sister), Gurbaksh Chahal (brother-in-law)

Neeru Bajwa (born 26 August 1980) is a Canadian actress, director and producer who has worked in Indian cinema mainly in Punjabi and Hindi films. One of the highest-paid actress of Punjabi cinema, Bajwa started her career in 1998 with Dev Anand's Hindi film Main Solah Baras Ki and then moved on to working in Hindi television and Punjabi films. Bajwa has since worked in commercially successful Punjabi films like Jatt & Juliet (2012), Jatt & Juliet 2 (2013), Sardaar Ji (2015), Laung Laachi (2018), Shadaa (2019), Kali Jotta (2023) and Jatt & Juliet 3 (2024).

She is a three-time PTC Punjabi Film Award winner and received the Critics’ Award for Best Actress at the inaugural Filmfare Awards Punjabi for Channo Kamli Yaar Di (2017). She made her Hollywood debut with the supernatural thriller It Lives Inside (2023).

== Early life ==
Born on 26 August 1980 to Indian immigrants Jaswant Bajwa and Surinder Bajwa in Surrey, British Columbia, Canada, Bajwa has two sisters—Rubina, an actress; Sabrina, a cloth designer and a brother Suhail. In her documentary film Bollywood Bound, Bajwa admits to being a high school (from L.A. Matheson Secondary School) drop-out who had little interest in studies and was always inspired by the glamour of Bollywood, so she moved to Mumbai to fulfill her dreams.

== Career ==
Bajwa started her career in Indian soap operas in 2005 with Hari Mirchi Lal Mirchi on DD1 before moving on to Astitva...Ek Prem Kahani on Zee TV followed by Jeet on Star Plus and then Guns and Roses on Star One.

In January 2013, Bajwa appeared in the multi-starer Punjabi film Saadi Love Story, produced by Jimmy Sheirgill productions, directed by Dheeraj Rattan and starring Diljit Dosanjh, Amrinder Gill, and Surveen Chawla. She paired up opposite Diljit Dosanjh again in the film Jatt and Juliet 2 which broke all the previous opening day collection records for Punjabi cinema. In August 2013, her film, Naughty Jatts was released in which she featured along with Binnu Dhillon, Arya Babbar and Roshan Prince. The film got mixed reviews from critics.

Bajwa debuted as a director in 2017 with the Punjabi film Sargi, which stars her sister Rubina Bajwa in the leading role alongside Jassi Gill and Babbal Rai. The title track of Laung Laachi (2018), featuring Bajwa and sung by Mannat Noor, became the first Indian song to surpass one billion views on YouTube in December 2019 and has crossed 1.5 billion views as of June 2025. In 2022, Bajwa starred in and produced Beautiful Billo, in which she shared the screen with her sister Rubina Bajwa. In 2024, Bajwa acted in Shayar, co-starring Satinder Sartaaj. 5 Dariya News remarked on the brilliance of their performances quoting, "Shayar is a film just made for Satinder Sartaaj who in just his second punjabi film has proved his worth as an actor, but we can't take away the credits from Neeru Bajwa the way she anchored herself alongside Sartaaj was commendable." The same year Jatt & Juliet 3, starring her and Dosanjh, became the fastest Punjabi film to cross the ₹100-crore (US $12.5 million) worldwide mark, setting a new industry record.

Since April 2021, Bajwa is hosting a Punjabi show Jazba. She also owns a production company called Neeru Bajwa Entertainment.

== Personal life ==
Bajwa married Harry Singh Jawandha on 8 February 2015. The couple had their first child, a girl, in August 2015. In 2020, Bajwa gave birth to twins, both girls.

Her brother-in-law is tech entrepreneur Gurbaksh Chahal.

== Filmography ==
Key
†	Denotes films that have not yet been released

=== As actor ===
Year	Film	Role	Language	Notes	Ref.
1998	Main Solah Baras Ki	Tina	Hindi		
2003	Bollywood Bound	Herself	English		
2004	Asa Nu Maan Watna Da	Neeru	Punjabi	as Arshveer Bajwa	
2006	Dil Apna Punjabi	Laadi	Punjabi		
2009	Munde U.K. De	Reet Brar	Punjabi		
2009	Heer Ranjha	Heer	Punjabi		
2010	Mel Karade Rabba	Seerat Randhawa	Punjabi		
2010	Prince	Maya	Hindi		
2010	Phoonk 2	Arushi	Hindi		
2010	Akh Labdi	Amar	Punjabi		
2011	Jihne Mera Dil Luteya	Noor Bajwa	Punjabi		
2011	Miley Naa Miley Hum	Manjeet Ahluwalia	Hindi		
2012	Pata Nahi Rabb Kehdeyan Rangan Ch Raazi	Simran	Punjabi		
2012	Jatt & Juliet	Pooja	Punjabi		
2012	Pinky Moge Wali	Pinky	Punjabi		
2013	Saadi Love Story	Tanya	Punjabi	Special appearance	
2013	Special 26	Special appearance in song "Gore Mukhde Pe Zulfen Di Chaava"	Hindi		
2013	Jatt & Juliet 2	Pooja	Punjabi		
2013	Naughty Jatts	Simmi Khera	Punjabi		
2013	Ronde Saare Vyah Picho	Manpreet Kaur, Mannu, Monika, Munni	Punjabi		
2014	Dil Vil Pyaar Vyaar	Prabhjeet	Punjabi		
2014	Aa Gaye Munde U.K. De	Disha Dhillion	Punjabi		
2014	Proper Patola	Preeti/Jeeti	Punjabi	Double role	
2015	Sardaar Ji	Pinky	Punjabi		
2016	Channo Kamli Yaar Di	Channo	Punjabi		
2017	Jindua	Ish	Punjabi		
2018	Laung Laachi	Laachi	Punjabi		
2018	Aate Di Chidi	Eliza	Punjabi		
2019	Uda Aida	Manjeet	Punjabi		
2019	Shadaa	Vanjhali	Punjabi		
2021	Paani Ch Madhaani	Sohni	Punjabi		
2021	Shava Ni Girdhari Lal	Shamo	Punjabi		
2022	Kokka	Ajooni	Punjabi		
2022	Beautiful Billo	Billo	Punjabi		
2022	Snowman: The Dark Side of Canada		Punjabi		
2022	Maa Da Ladla	Sehaj	Punjabi		
2022	Laung Laachi 2	Miriam	Punjabi		
2023	Kali Jotta	Rabia	Punjabi		
2023	Es Jahano Door Kitte Chal Jindiye	Arshveer	Punjabi	Also producer	
2023	It Lives Inside	Poorna	English		
2023	Buhe Bariyan	Prem Kaur	Punjabi	Also producer	
2024	Shayar	Seero	Punjabi		
2024	Jatt & Juliet 3	Pooja	Punjabi		
2024	Shukrana		Punjabi		
2025	Sardaar Ji 3	Rani Churail aka Pinky	Punjabi		
2025	Son of Sardaar 2	Dimple	Hindi		
2025	Tehran	Sheilaja	Hindi		
2025	Phaphey Kuttniyan		Punjabi		
2025	Madhaniyan		Punjabi		

=== As director ===
Year	Film	Cast	Notes
2017	Sargi	Jassi Gill, Babbal Rai, Karamjit Anmol, Rubina Bajwa	Debut

=== Television ===
Year	Series	Role	Notes
2003	Astitva...Ek Prem Kahani	Kiran	
2003–2004	Jeet	Nandini	
2004–2005	Guns & Roses	Divya	
2005	Hari Mirchi Lal Mirchi	Rinku	
2005–2006	Nach Baliye 1	Contestant	
2021	Jazba	Host/presenter	Punjabi-language show
