= Harish Verma =

Indian actor

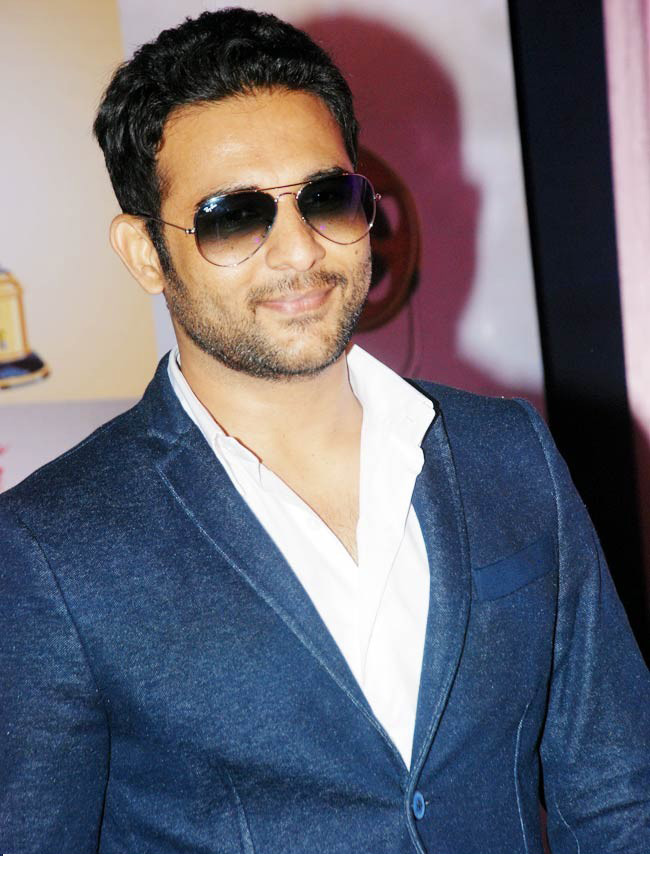
- Verma at press conference in Chandigarh
- Born: Chandigarh, India
- Occupations: Film actor; singer
- Years active: 1999–present

Harish Verma is an Indian actor and singer associated with Punjabi-language films and music. He made his debut in the 2010 film Panjaban, and gained wide attention with Yaar Annmulle (2011). He made his singing debut with the track Ikk Vaari Hor Soch Lae, which was written by Jaani and produced by B Praak.

== Filmography ==
Year	Film	Role	Notes
2010	Punjaban	Karan	Released on 24 September 2010
2011	Yaar Annmulle	Khadak Sher Singh alias Jatt Tinka	Released on 7 October 2011
2012	Burrraahh	Varinder Singh aka Valley	Released on 19 October 2012
2013	Daddy Cool Munde Fool	Ganni	Released on 12 April 2013
2013	Viyah 70 KM	Aman	Released on 13 September 2013
2013	Ronde Saare Vyah Picho	Ranbir Singh	Released on 11 October 2013
2014	Happy Go Lucky	Goldy	Released on 21 November 2014
2014	Proper Patola	Raj M	Released on 29 November 2014
2015	What The Jatt	Raj	Released on 13 March 2015
2016	Vaapsi	Ajit	Released on 3 June 2016
2017	Krazzy Tabbar	Bittu	Released on 7 July 2017
2017	Thug Life	Manjinder Singh / MLA	Released on 21 July 2017
2018	Subedar Joginder Singh	commander	Released on 6 April 2018
2018	Golak Bugni Bank Te Batua	Neeta	Released on 13 April 2018
2018	Ashke	Special appearance	Released on 27 July 2018
2019	Nadhoo Khan	Channan	Released on 26 April 2019
2019	Laiye Je Yaarian	Sukh	Released on 5 June 2019
2019	Munda Hi Chahida	Dharmender	Released on 12 July 2019
2021	Yaar Anmulle Returns	Jatt Tinka	Released on 10 September 2021
2021	Golak Bugni Bank Te Batua 2†	TBA	Filming
2022	Tere Layi	Amreek	Released on 9 December 2022
2023	Any How Mitti Pao	Harry	

=== Television ===
Year	Title	Role
2009	Na Aana Is Des Laado	Avtaar Sheela Sangwan
2020	PTC Punjabi Film Awards 2020	Host

== Singles ==
Year	Album	Record label	Lyrics	Music
2016	Ikk Vaari Hor Soch Lae	Speed Records	Jaani	B Praak
2017	Yaar Ve	Speed Records	Jaani	B Praak
2018	Judaayi	T-Series	Kulshan Sandhu	MixSingh
2019	Chehre	Jass Records	Sandhu Kuldeep	Star boy Music X
2019	Sharam	T-Series	Daljit Chitti	Silver Coin
