= DJ Waley Babu =

2015 song by Badshah

Single by Badshah featuring Aastha Gill

from the album ONE (Original Never Ends)
- Language: Punjabi; Hindi
- Released: 16 July 2015
- Genre: Indian hip hop
- Length: 2:36 (Music video); 2:49 (Audio)
- Label: Sony Music India
- Songwriter: Soham Haldar

ONE (Original Never Ends) track listing
- 1. "DJ Waley Babu"; 2. "Mercy"; 3. "Therapy"; 4. "Heartless"; 5. "Nain"; 6. "Kya Kehte Ho"; 7. "I.LL.IAM"; 8. "Jaavi Na"; 9. "Aashiq Awara"; 10. "Light Kardo Band"; 11. "Aise Na Dekh Mujhe"; 12. "No Limit"; 13. "Oxygen"; 14. "Call Waiting"; 15. "Take Off"; 16. "Right Up There"; 17. "She Move It Like"

Music video
- "DJ Waley Babu" on YouTube

"DJ Waley Babu" is a Punjabi-Hindi hip-hop single by Badshah featuring Aastha Gill, released by Sony Music India on 16 July 2015.

== Background ==
The song is sung by Badshah and Aastha Gill. It is the first single from Badshah's album the ONE (Original Never Ends). The song was released on 17 July 2015 by Sony Music India via YouTube and other music streaming services.

== Reception ==
The song was extremely popular at the time of the launch and gave both singers recognition in the Bollywood industry. As of 26 Mar 2020, the song's music video has over 270 million views on YouTube.
