= Ardaas (film) =

- Theatrical release poster
- Directed by: Gippy Grewal
- Written by: Gippy Grewal
- Story by: Gippy Grewal
- Produced by: Gippy Grewal; Sukhjinder Bhachu; Pushpinder Happy; Sippy Grewal; Aman Khatkar; Badshah (Aditya Singh)
- Starring: Gurpreet Ghuggi; Ammy Virk; B.N. Sharma; Rana Ranbir; Karamjit Anmol; Mandy Takhar; Isha Rikhi
- Narrated by: Yogesh Grover
- Cinematography: Baljit Singh Deo
- Edited by: Baljit Singh Deo
- Music by: Jatinder Shah
- Backgrounds by: Yogesh Grover
- Production companies: Humble Motion Pictures; Sippy Grewal Productions; Aman Khatkar Arsara Films
- Release date: 11 March 2016
- Running time: 135 minutes
- Country: India
- Language: Punjabi

Ardaas is an Indian Punjabi-language film. It is directed and written by Gippy Grewal and the dialogues are written by Rana Ranbir and was released on 11 March 2016.

== Plot ==
The movie revolves around Master Gurmukh (Gurpreet Ghuggi) and how he arrives in a new village after being posted to a government school. He helps various villagers by reminding them of their good values and teaching them more while he simultaneously faces his own inner guilt.

== Cast ==
- Gurpreet Ghuggi as Master Gurmukh Singh
- Ammy Virk as Agyapal Singh/Aasi
- B.N. Sharma as Subedar Saab
- Karamjit Anmol as Shambhu Nath/Lala
- Rana Ranbir as Lottery (Postman)
- Mandy Takhar as Binder
- Sardar Sohi as Diler Singh Sohi (Aasi's Father)
- Isha Rikhi as Mannat Brar
- Meher Vij as Baani
- Satwant Kaur as Lady Doctor
- Harby Sangha as Nagraaj/Sapp
- Prince Kanwaljit Singh
- Gippy Grewal as Sukhi (Cameo Appearance)

== Track list ==
S. No.	Track	Singer	Lyrics	Music
1.	"Daata Ji"	Nachhatar Gill	Happy Raikoti	Jatinder Shah
2.	"Kawa Wali Panchait"	Ammy Virk	Gill Raunta	Jatinder Shah
3.	"Jann Ton Pyara"	Tarannum Malik & Happy Raikoti	Happy Raikoti	Jatinder Shah
4.	"Mere Sahib"	Gippy Grewal & Sunidhi Chauhan	Happy Raikoti	Jatinder Shah
5.	"Nain"	Ammy Virk & Gurlez Akhtar	Amrit Mann	Jatinder Shah
6.	"Fakeera"	Kanwar Grewal	Happy Raikoti	Jatinder Shah

== Release ==
The film was released on 11 March 2016 in the theatres.

== Reception ==
Ardaas was premiered on 10 March 2016 as part of Punjabi International Film Festival Toronto 2016 in Brampton (Canada). Aamir Khan praised the story and trailer of the film.

=== Box office ===
First time in history of Punjabi cinema two major Superstars' films were released on same day, Ardaas and Love Punjab.

=== Critical response ===
The Tribune reviewed Ardaas as a film that will touch every heart as it doesn't have a lesson but has meaning. CNN-IBN reviewed Ardaas as a film that will help you understand how every experience in life that has the potential of becoming a spiritual experience.

== Sequel ==
The second film of the franchise, Ardaas Karaan, was released on 19 July 2019. The third film of the franchise, Ardaas Sarbat De Bhalle Di, was released on 13 September 2024.
