= Ratan Kahar =

Indian folk singer

Ratan Kahar Padma Shri
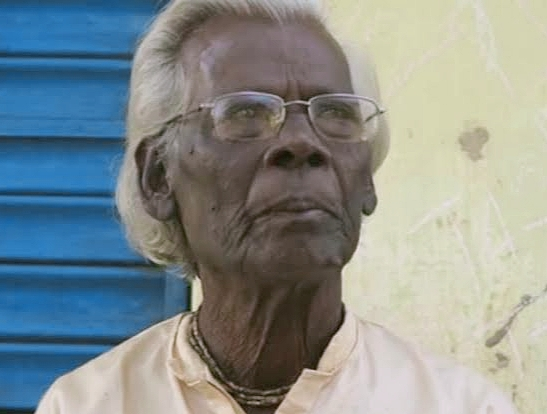
- Born: Bhandirban Kenduli, Birbhum, Bengal Presidency, British India (now West Bengal)
- Occupations: Jhumur, Bhadu song lyricist, composer and singer
- Years active: 1964–present
- Notable work: Boroloker Biti Lo
- Spouse: Shanti Kahar
- Awards: Padma Shri (2024)

Ratan Kahar is a Padma Shri awarded folk singer from West Bengal state of India.

== Biography ==
Ratan Kahar (born 1935) is a veteran folk singer of Bhadu and Jhumur songs of rural Bengal in India. The Government of India awarded the Padma Shri, the country's fourth highest civilian award, in 2024. His famous song Boroloker Biti Lo gained popularity in 1972 with Swapna Chakraborty's voice. The original line of this song Lal Genda Phul caused controversy when popular rap artist Badshah released his "Genda Phul" in 2020. Due to that controversy, Ratan Kahar's music creation, achievements, songs, artistry came to the fore. Badshah settled the dispute by giving him five lakh rupees.

== Published works ==
His other Bengali songs are:

- Didi jano ki go jano na
- Pala Re Pala Re Ravana
- Thele de Mal Garita Chapabo Basta
- Aghranete Naban khete amar bandhu keno elo na

== Awards ==
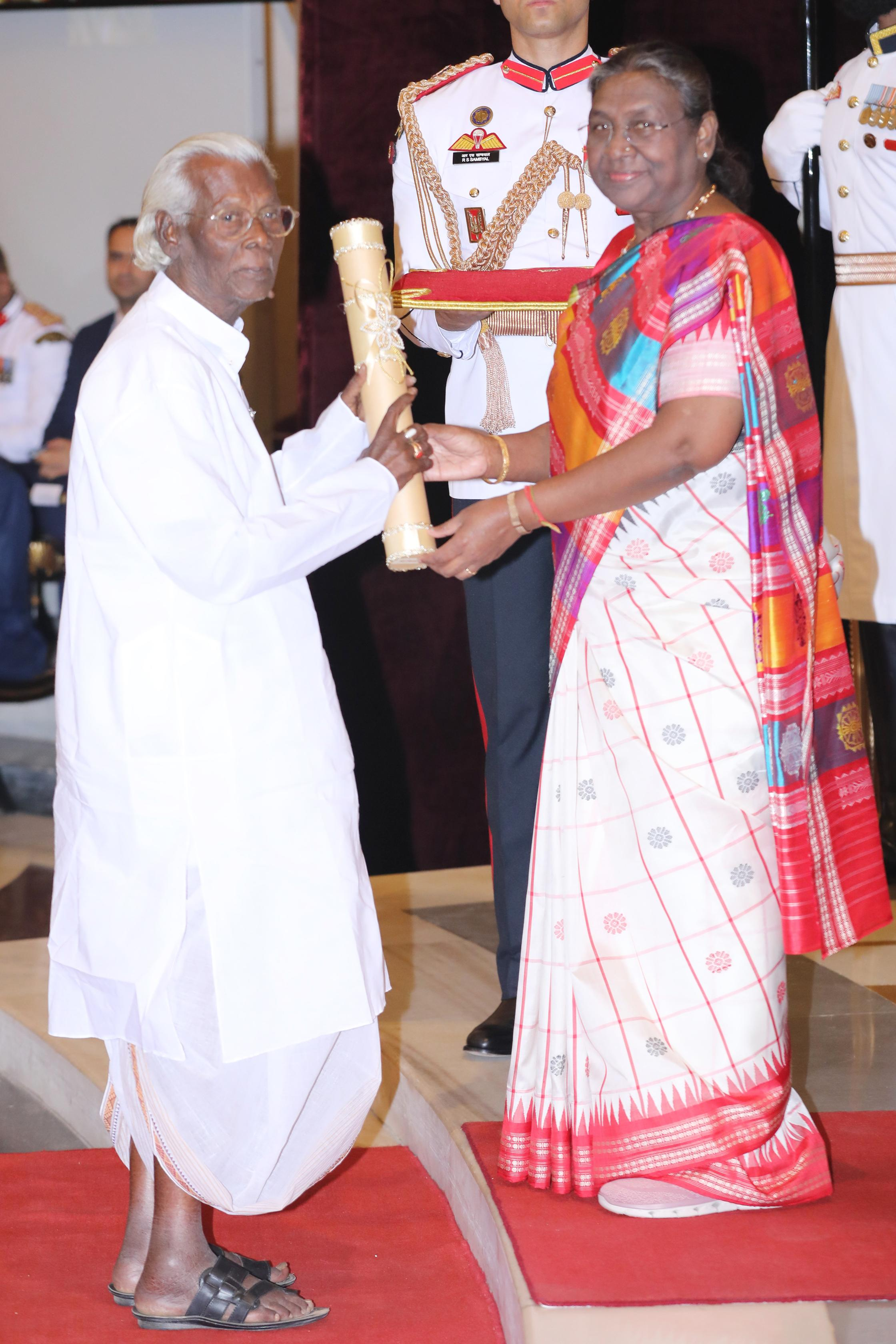
Ratan Kahar receiving the Padma Shri award from President Droupadi Murmu

In 2024, Government of India honored him with country's fourth highest civilian award Padma Shri.
