= Do Dooni Panj =

2019 film directed by Harry Bhatti

- Theatrical release poster
- Directed by: Harry Bhatti
- Screenplay by: Jeeva
- Story by: Jeeva
- Produced by: Badshah; Uchana Amit
- Starring: Amrit Maan; Isha Rikhi; Rana Ranbir; Karamjit Anmol; Sardar Sohi; Harby Sangha; Nirmal Rishi
- Cinematography: Chakravarty
- Edited by: Bharat S. Rawat
- Music by: Badshah; The Boss; Meet Sehra; Jassi Katyal
- Production company: Apra Films
- Distributed by: White Hill Studios
- Release date: 11 January 2019 (India)
- Running time: 132 minutes
- Country: India
- Language: Punjabi
- Budget: 70 million
- Box office: 50 million

Do Dooni Panj is a 2019 Indian-Punjabi drama film directed by Harry Bhatti. The film stars Amrit Maan, Isha Rikhi, Rana Ranbir, Karamjit Anmol, Sardar Sohi, Harby Sangha, and Nirmal Rishi in prominent roles. The film is produced by Badshah & Uchana Amit under the former's production house Apra Films.

== Cast ==
- Amrit Maan
- Isha Rikhi as Noor
- Rana Ranbir as Magistrate
- Karamjit Anmol as Kala Halwaai
- Sardar Sohi as Principal
- Harby Sangha
- Nirmal Rishi
- Harby Sangha
- Nisha Bano
- Rupinder Rupi as Anju Devi
- Malkeet Rauni as Gurdeep Singh
- Tarsem Paul as Teacher Inerjeet
- Preeto Sawhney as A Teacher

== Soundtrack ==
Do Dooni Panj

Soundtrack album by Badshah, The Boss, Meet Sehra and Jassi Katyal.
- Released: 4 January 2019
- Recorded: 2018
- Genre: Feature film soundtrack
- Language: Punjabi
- Label: Sony Music India

Soundtrack of the film is composed by Badshah, The Boss and Jassi Katyal. Also, features the vocals from Rahat Fateh Ali Khan, Neha Kakkar, Badshah, Amrit Maan, Jordan Sandhu, and The Landers. The songs "Jacketan Lightan Waliyan" and "Peg" by Amrit Maan, "Fikar" by Khan and Kakkar were well received by audience. Full soundtrack was released on 4 January 2019 on iTunes and other music platforms by Sony Music India.

Track listing
No.	Title	Lyrics	Music	Singer(s)	Length
1.	"Jacketan Lightan Waliyan"	Amrit Maan, Badshah	Badshah	Amrit Maan, Badshah	2:34
2.	"Fikar"	Vindar Nathu Majra	Badshah	Rahat Fateh Ali Khan, Neha Kakkar	3:58
3.	"Peg"	Amrit Maan	Badshah, Jassi Katyal	Amrit Maan	4:13
4.	"Madam"	Bunty Bains	The Boss	Jordan Sandhu	1:57
