= Athiya Shetty =

Indian former actress (born 1992)

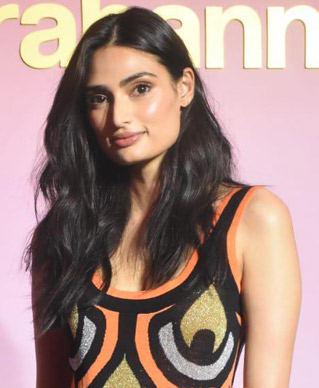
- Shetty in 2023
- Born: 5 November 1992 (age 33); Bombay, Maharashtra, India
- Occupation: Actress
- Years active: 2015–2019
- Spouse: KL Rahul (m. 2023)
- Children: 1
- Parents: Suniel Shetty (father); Monisha Kadri (mother)
- Relatives: Ahan Shetty (brother)

Athiya Shetty (born 5 November 1992) is a former Indian actress who worked in Hindi films. The daughter of actor Suniel Shetty, she made her acting debut with the romantic action Hero (2015), which earned her the Stardust Award for Superstar of Tomorrow – Female nomination. Following leading roles in the romantic comedy Mubarakan (2017) and the comedy drama Motichoor Chaknachoor (2019), she quit acting.

== Early life ==
Athiya Shetty was born on 5 November 1992 in Bombay, Maharashtra to actor Sunil Shetty and director Mana Shetty. While her father hails from the Tulu-speaking Bunt community, her mother was born to a Punjabi Hindu mother and a Gujarati Muslim father. She has a younger brother, Ahan Shetty, who also became an actor after debuting in the film Tadap (2021).

Shetty studied at the Cathedral and John Connon School and later shifted to the American School of Bombay. While there, she participated in school plays alongside Shraddha Kapoor and Tiger Shroff. She relocated to New York City to enroll at the New York Film Academy, as she wanted to act in films.

== Career ==
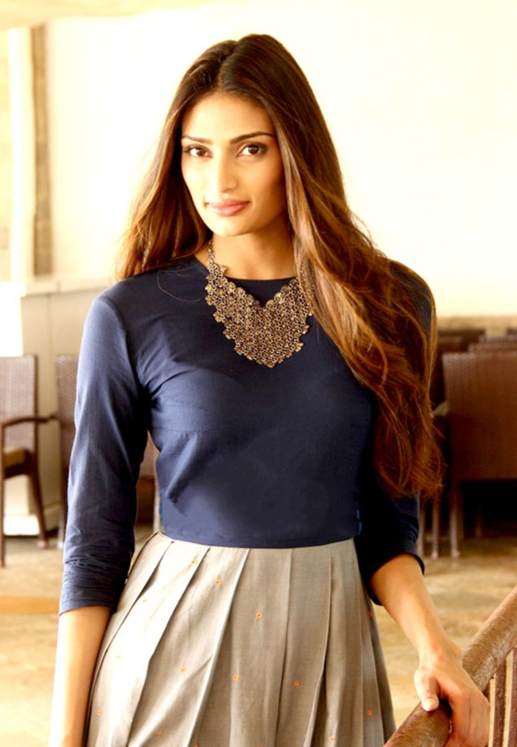
Shetty snapped at Hero media interaction, in 2015

Shetty made her acting debut in 2015 with the Nikhil Advani-directed romantic action film Hero, a remake of co-producer Subhash Ghai's 1983 classic of the same name. Produced by Salman Khan and co-written by Advani and Umesh Bist, the film earned a total revenue of ₹34.82 crore (US$3.6 million). She portrayed the role of Mumbai-based aspiring dancer Radha Mathur, who falls in love with her kidnapper Sooraj (Sooraj Pancholi), a gangster trying to extort her police chief father, IG Shrikant Mathur. Bollywood Hungama, a leading website of India, wrote that ″Shetty needs some more time to improve her acting skills″. After her debut, she became the brand ambassador for the Indian franchise of Maybelline New York and featured in the Indian edition of high-profile magazine covers such as Cosmopolitan, Verve, Harper's Bazaar and many more.

After a brief period of 2 years, Shetty appeared in Anees Bazmee's romantic comedy Mubarakan opposite Anil Kapoor, Arjun Kapoor and Ileana D'Cruz. The film, shot in Punjab and London, was a box office hit, though perceived to be a failure, and earned 93.59 crores. In the film, she played the role of a simple Punjabi girl named Binkle Sandhu who falls in love with Charan (Arjun Kapoor) but her wedding is instead fixed with Charan's twin brother Karan, who wants to marry his love interest Sweety (D'Cruz). Shetty received positive to mixed reviews for her performance in the film, though the film received mixed to negative reviews. She then appeared in a song, "Tere Naal Nachna", in 2018, composed, written and sung by Badshah, and featuring newbie singer Sunanda Sharma, for the film Nawabzaade, produced by Remo D'Souza and directed by choreographer Jayesh Pradhan, starring Raghav Juyal, Dharmesh Yelande and Punit Pathak.

Later on, in 2019, Shetty was cast as Anita "Ani" Awasthi, a young woman who is desperate to settle abroad by marrying an NRI, in Debamitra Biswal's comedy drama Motichoor Chaknachoor, opposite Nawazuddin Siddiqui. The film opened to mixed reviews.

== Personal life ==
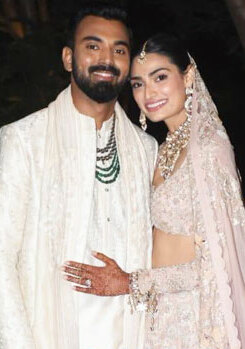
Shetty with her husband KL Rahul in 2023

Shetty started dating Indian cricketer KL Rahul in 2019. They got married on 23 January 2023 at Suniel Shetty's farmhouse in Khandala. Shetty gave birth to a girl, on 24 March 2025 and named her Evaarah.

== Filmography ==
=== Films ===
Year	Title	Role	Notes	Ref.
2015	Hero	Radha Mathur	Debut film	
2017	Mubarakan	Binkle Sandhu Bajwa	Lead role	
2018	Nawabzaade	Herself	Special appearance in the song "Tere Naal Nachna"	
2019	Motichoor Chaknachoor	Anita "Ani" Awasthi	Final Film	

== Awards and nominations ==
Year	Award	Category	Work	Result
2015	Stardust Awards	Superstar of Tomorrow (Female)	Hero	Nominated
2015	Stardust Awards	Best Jodi Of The Year (Shared with Sooraj Pancholi)	Hero	Won
2015	BIG Star Entertainment Awards	Most Entertaining Debut (Female)	Hero	Nominated
2016	Producers Guild Film Awards	Best Female Debut	Hero	Nominated
2016	Producers Guild Film Awards	Most Promising Debut Jodi (Shared with Sooraj Pancholi)	Hero	Won
2016	Screen Awards	Best Female Debut	Hero	Nominated
2016	Screen Awards	Jodi No. 1 (Shared with Sooraj Pancholi )	Hero	Nominated
2016	International Indian Film Academy Awards	Hottest Pair (Shared with Sooraj Pancholi)	Hero	Won
