= Haitham Mohammed Rafi =

Omani singer

Haitham Rafi
- Born: Haitham Mohammed Rafi; September 2, 1993 (age 32); Muscat, Oman
- Origin: Omani
- Genres: Pop
- Occupations: Singer, songwriter, producer, engineer, director
- Instruments: Guitar, Piano, Oud

Haitham Rafi (Arabic: هيثم رافي; born September 2, 1993) is an Omani singer known for winning first season of Dil Hai Hindustani. He is the first Omani artist to compete in and win an Indian reality competition show.

== Early life and career ==
Rafi was born on November 2, 1993, in Muscat, Oman. His father was a musician who inspired him to pursue a career in the field. Rafi started singing at a young age and participated in local talent shows in Oman. He also learned to play various musical instruments, including the oud and the guitar.

In 2014, Rafi participated in the "بوليفارد المواهب" competition and made it to the top 50 contestants. This experience motivated him to continue pursuing his dream of becoming a successful musician.

=== Indian Reality Show and career breakthrough ===
In 2021, Rafi participated in Dil Hai Hindustani, a popular Indian reality competition show. His performance on the show was highly appreciated by the judges and the audience, and he eventually emerged as the winner of the show. This victory made him the first Omani artist to win an Indian reality show. He has since collaborated with various Indian musicians and has performed in several concerts across India and the Middle East.

In 2019, Rafi competed on season 9 of the Ukrainian version of The Voice, Holos Krainy, where he advanced to knockout stage.

== Personal life ==
Rafi is known for being a private person and has not shared much about his personal life in the media. He is fluent in Arabic, English and Hindi, and is known for his love for travelling and exploring new cultures.

== See also ==
- Lists of musicians
- List of Omani singers
