= Nawabzaade =

2018 Indian film by Jayesh Pradhan

- Official poster
- Directed by: Jayesh Pradhan
- Written by: Pradeep Singh
- Produced by: Lizelle D'Souza; Mayur K. Barot
- Starring: Raghav Juyal; Punit Pathak; Dharmesh Yelande; Isha Rikhi
- Cinematography: Shehnad Jalaal
- Edited by: Mukesh Thakur
- Music by: Badshah; Guru Randhawa; Gurinder Seagal
- Production companies: T-Films; R.D. Entertainment
- Distributed by: AA Films
- Release date: 27 July 2018
- Running time: 112 minutes
- Country: India
- Language: Hindi
- Box office: ₹4.05 crore

Nawabzaade (transl. Prince's son; Hindi pronunciation: [nəʋaːbzaːd̪eː]) is a 2018 Indian Hindi-language romantic comedy film directed by Jayesh Pradhan and produced by Lizelle D'Souza under R.D. Entertainment and Mayur K. Barot under T-Films. The film stars Raghav Juyal, Punit Pathak and Dharmesh Yelande in the lead roles and debutant Isha Rikhi in a supporting role. It was theatrically released on 27 July 2018 by AA Films.

== Plot ==
Karan (Raghav Juyal), Abhishek (Punit Pathak), and Salim (Dharmesh Yelande) are three inseparable best friends living in a small Indian town. Their lives take a turn when they all fall for the same woman, Sheetal (Isha Rikhi), a seemingly traditional and modest girl who has recently moved into their neighborhood.

Each friend, unaware of the others' intentions, embarks on a mission to win Sheetal's heart. They go to great lengths, including spending their savings and trying to impress her family, all in hopes of securing her affection. Their efforts lead to humorous situations and strain their friendship as competition intensifies.

However, the story takes a twist when Sheetal marries someone else, revealing that she may have been leading them on. This revelation forces the friends to confront the reality of their situation and reevaluate their priorities, ultimately realizing the value of their friendship over a romantic pursuit.

== Cast ==
- Raghav Juyal as Karan
- Punit Pathak as Abhishek
- Dharmesh Yelande as Salim
- Isha Rikhi as Sheetal
- Zakir Hussain as Sheetal's father
- Mukesh Tiwari as Premnath
- Vinod Nahardih (Actor) as Chacha (tailor master)
- Mohd Sharia
- Jyoti Joshi as Sheetal's mother
- Varun Dhawan (special appearance in the song "High Rated Gabru")
- Shraddha Kapoor (special appearance in the song "High Rated Gabru")
- Shakti Mohan (special appearance in the song "Amma Dekh")
- Athiya Shetty (special appearance in the song "Tere Naal Nachna")
- Badshah (special appearance in the song "Tere Naal Nachna")
- Sanjeeda Sheikh (special appearance in the song "Mummy Kasam")
- Aamir Ali (cameo appearance of one scene in the song "Mummy Kasam")

== Soundtrack ==
Nawabzaade

Soundtrack album by Gurinder Seagal, Guru Randhawa and Badshah
- Released: 17 July 2018
- Recorded: 2017–2018
- Genre: Feature film soundtrack
- Length: 18:26
- Language: Hindi
- Label: T-Series
External audio
- Official Audio Jukebox on YouTube
Gurinder Seagal chronology
Race 3 (2018)	Nawabzaade (2018)	Street Dancer 3D (2020)
Guru Randhawa chronology
Blackmail (2018)	Nawabzaade (2018)	Why Cheat India (2019)
Badshah chronology
Blackmail (2018)	Nawabzaade (2018)	Namaste England (2018)

The music rights of the film were acquired by T-Series. The music was composed by Gurinder Seagal, Guru Randhawa and Badshah. While the song "High Rated Gabru" by Guru Randhawa, released by T-Series in 2017, was recreated for the film. The first official song, "High Rated Gabru" (ft. Varun Dhawan and Shraddha Kapoor), was a remake of the song by singer Guru Randhawa, released on 28 June 2018, followed by "Tere Naal Nachna" on 5 July, which marked the Bollywood singing debut of female Punjabi singer Sunanda Sharma. The soundtrack album was released on 17 July 2018.

The song "Amma Dekh" is a remake of the song of "Amma Dekh Tera Munda" from the 1994 film Stuntman sung by Bali Brahmbhatt and Alka Yagnik, composed by Nadeem-Shravan and written by Sameer Anjaan but due to copyright issue was not included in the film and dropped to a single.

Track listing
No.	Title	Lyrics	Music	Singer(s)	Length
1.	"High Rated Gabru"	Guru Randhawa	Guru Randhawa	Guru Randhawa	02:59
2.	"Tere Naal Nachna"	Badshah	Badshah	Badshah, Sunanda Sharma	02:46
3.	"Mummy Kasam"	Kunaal Vermaa, Gurinder Seagal	Gurinder Seagal	Gurinder Seagal, Payal Dev, Ikka	02:58
4.	"High Rated Gabru" (Female Version)	Guru Randhawa	Guru Randhawa	Aditi Singh Sharma	02:05
5.	"Lagi Hawa Dil Ko"	Sandeep Nath	Gurinder Sehgal	Mika Singh, Gurinder Seagal, Altamash Faridi, Nettle	05:10
6.	"Amma Dekh"	Gurinder Seagal, Ikka	Gurinder Sehgal	Gurinder Seagal, Sukriti Kakar, Ikka	02:26
Total length:					18:26
