= Genda Phool =

2020 Hindi pop song

Single by Badshah featuring Payal Dev
- Language: Hindi, Bengali, English
- English title: "Marigold flower"
- Released: 26 March 2020
- Genre: Indian pop
- Length: 2:50
- Label: Sony Music India
- Songwriter: Ratan Kahar (Bankura)

"Genda Phool" (transl. Marigold flower) is a 2020 Hindi pop song by Indian rapper Badshah featuring playback singer Payal Dev. The music video for the song features Sri Lankan actress Jacqueline Fernandez, and Badshah. It stood as the 4th most-watched music video on YouTube for the year 2020 across the world. It has above 1 billion views on YouTube as of September 2023. The song is a remake of the song Boro Loker Biti Lo originally sung by Swapna Chakraborty. The main verse 'Boroloker Beti lo' is taken from the Bengali folk song which was originally written, composed and tuned by Ratan Kahar. This Bengali folk song was very popular during the late 60s and 70s in West Bengal and Bangladesh.

== History ==
The song is written and composed by Badshah, while the Bengali lyrics of the song was written by Ratan Kahar whereas it is sung by Badshah and it is set around the Hindu festival Durga Puja. The song was launched by Karan Johar, a friend of Badshah, on his social media.

== Music video ==
The music video features Badshah and Sri Lankan actress Jacqueline Fernandez. Directed by Sneha Shetty Kohli, it was filmed in Esel Studio, Mumbai, over a period of two days. The video was released on 26 March 2020 on YouTube during the 2020 coronavirus lockdown in India. Choreographer Piyush and Shazia

== Reception ==
Firstpost called the song a "foot-tapping number". Hindustan Times wrote: "[the song] is a steamy track which has a distinct folk melody fused with urban sounds". Latestly was disappointed with the lyrics, writing: "While the composition of Genda Phool is all fine, its lyrics play a spoilsport. Badshah's rap doesn't make sense and it even sounds childish at one point". Mid-Day praised the music video of the song, writing, "The one thing that immediately strikes you about the song is the vibrancy with which it has been shot and captured".

=== Performance ===
It topped the Global YouTube Music Video Charts for two weeks with few more days and gained international listeners and attracted several other artists as well from around the world.

== Plagiarism issues ==
Badshah was grossly criticized over him sampling lines, "Boroloker bitilo, lomba lomba chul, Emon mathay bendhe debo lal genda phool" which is from a Bengali folk number Boroloker Biti Lo, without giving any due credits to the original lyricist named Ratan Kahar and singer of the composition named Swapna Chakraborty, to be more precise Badshah was accused of plagiarism. Later he came up stating that the folk lyrics were not protected with any copyright infringement anywhere and it was not the first time that the lyrics are being used in songs, hence he doesn't find himself in any legal trouble and all that happened was nothing but a mere coincidence. When Ratan was approached by a website regarding the issue, he stated: "No one has contacted me yet since the release of the number" Responding to the allegation, Payal Dev said that folk songs do not have rights and the same song had been "used six to seven times" without any credit.

The rapper, on the other hand, came forward to help the folk lyricist on 'humanitarian backgrounds' by providing him with a financial aid of sum of Rs.5 lakhs and promised that would meet the veteran artist as soon as possible and would most probably collaborate with him as well.
