= Happy Go Lucky (2014 film) =

- Directed by: Amarpreet GS Chhabra
- Screenplay by: Amberdeep Singh; Rajan Agarwal
- Story by: Rajan Agarwal
- Produced by: Pammi Baweja
- Starring: Amrinder Gill; Isha Rikhi; Harish Verma; Shruti Sodhi; Shiwani Saini; Sumit Sandhu; Dakshita Kumaria; Gurpreet Ghuggi
- Cinematography: Vineet Malhotra
- Edited by: Mukesh Takhur
- Music by: Jatinder Shah; Jassi Katyal
- Production companies: Baweja Movies Pvt.Ltd. Saga Music
- Release date: 21 November 2014
- Running time: 129 minutes
- Country: India
- Language: Punjabi

Happy Go Lucky is a 2014 Punjabi film directed by Amarpreet GS Chhabra, story/screenplay by Amberdeep Singh and Rajan Agarwal and starring Amrinder Gill, Isha Rikhi, Harish Verma, Shruti Sodhi, Sumit Sandhu, Dakshita Kumaria, Shiwani Saini, and Gurpreet Ghuggi as the main cast of the film. This film was released on 21 November 2014.

== Cast ==
- Amrinder Gill as Harwinder Singh / Happy
- Isha Rikhi as Sirat
- Harish Verma as Goldy
- Shruti Sodhi as Jas
- Sumit Sandhu as Lucky
- Dakshita Kumaria as Mahek
- Shiwani Saini as Preet
- Gurpreet Ghuggi as Harpal
- Kuldeep Sharma as Harnek Brar
- Tarsem Paul as Parminder Singh
- Sahdev Salaria as Gama
- Parminder Gill as Drug addict's mother

== Plot ==
Happy Go Lucky tells the story of three sisters who desire their life partners to be an inspector, a singer and an NRI. Coincidentally, when they speak of their desires, Bhalla, the father of three sons, overhears them and realizes that his sons match all their wishes. The girls' father initially is upset, and declines the match. However, eventually the marriages take place.
