= Motichoor Chaknachoor =

Indian Hindi comedy-drama film

- Theatrical release poster
- Directed by: Debamitra Biswal
- Written by: Screenplay: Sohaib Hasan; Dialogues: Bhupendra Singh
- Story by: Debamitra Biswal
- Produced by: Rajesh Bhatia; Kiran Bhatia; Viacom18 Studios
- Starring: Nawazuddin Siddiqui; Athiya Shetty
- Cinematography: Suhas Gujarathi
- Edited by: Praveen Kathikuloth
- Music by: Songs: Bharat-Hitarth; Ramji Gulati; Arjuna Harjai; Amjad Nadeem Aamir; Siddharth Amit Bhavsar; Score: Abhijit Vaghani
- Production companies: Viacom18 Studios; Woodpecker Movies Private Limited
- Distributed by: Viacom18 Studios
- Release date: 15 November 2019
- Country: India
- Language: Hindi

Motichoor Chaknachoor is a 2019 Indian comedy drama film directed by debutante Debamitra Biswal and produced by Rajesh Bhatia and Kiran Bhatia under Woodpecker Movies Private Limited in association with Viacom 18 Studios. Starring Nawazuddin Siddiqui and Athiya Shetty in the lead roles. The film also stars Vibha Chibber, Navni Parihar, Vivek Mishra, Karuna Pandey, Sanjeev Vats, Abhishek Rawat, Sapna Sand and Usha Nagar in supporting roles.

It follows the story of a 36-year-old man, Pushpinder Tyagi, working abroad in Dubai, trying to find a wife back home in Bhopal, meets his much younger neighbor, Anita "Ani" Awasthi, who wants to marry someone settled abroad.

The film was theatrically released in India on 19 November 2019. Although the subject got mixed reviews, it earned praise for Nawazuddin Siddiqui's performance. On 24 January 2020, the film was released on Netflix and it was instant hit with the audience and trended for six weeks amongst Top 10 viewed movies.

== Plot ==
Anita "Anny" Awasthi, a girl from a middle-class family in Bhopal, has turned down several marriage proposals because she is desperate to marry an NRI and settle abroad. Ani meets her neighbor Pushpinder Tyagi, an accountant in Dubai who has returned to Bhopal to find a bride. He is 36 years old and is desperate to marry any willing girl no matter her appearance or personality. His mother Indu, is concerned only about the dowry her son can fetch. Ani's unmarried aunt, Prabha, encourages Ani to convince Pushpinder to marry her so she can settle in Dubai.

Pushpinder and his family meet an apparently wealthy family for a marriage proposal. Both families agree for marriage, Indu makes a demand for dowry to which girl's family rejects. In a fit of rage, Indu calls off the wedding. Realizing that Pushpinder is a mama's boy who would never cross his mother, Ani talks him into eloping with her. When they show up back at the family's doorstep already married, the two families are forced to accept their marriage and start preparing for a wedding ceremony.

Despite Indu's anger that Ani's family cannot afford her dowry demands, the wedding goes ahead as planned. When Ani's father discreetly offers Pushpinder a portion of the dowry amount, he refuses to take it because he does not believe in the concept of dowry. Ani overhears their conversation and gains more respect for Pushpinder. Nevertheless, she feels no attraction for him and cannot consummate the marriage.

News arrives from Dubai that Pushpinder has been fired from his job there, to which he reveals that he has secured a job in Bhopal and plans to settle here. This enrages Indu and Ani, who both desperately want Pushpinder to move back to Dubai. Soon Pushpinder is offered his Dubai job back with raised pay. Indu tells Pushpinder to take the job, to which he refuses by saying Dubai does not suit him, he misses everyone and wishes to stay close to his family.

Indu then advises Ani not to consummate the marriage until he agrees to return to Dubai. Pushpinder, overhearing them discuss their plan, argues with Ani and slaps her. Infuriated Ani goes back to her parents' house but her father tells her to work it out as it was her decision to marry Pushpinder. She leaves both homes and stands outside her house until Pushpinder's grandmother convinces her to come inside. Ani stays angry with Pushpinder even after he makes some attempts to reconcile.

One night, Pushpinder abruptly leaves for Dubai. He leaves a note to Ani in which he apologizes for slapping her. He also encloses a one-way ticket to Singapore so that her dream of settling abroad may yet come true. In Pushpinder's absence, Indu and Ani see the error of their ways. Indu regrets forcing Pushpinder into working in Dubai to satisfy her financial needs. Ani regrets marrying Pushpinder without any personal attachment solely from a desire to leave India. Meanwhile, Pushpinder, unable to leave his family behind, returns. His sudden reappearance sparks a reconciliation with Indu and Ani. Pushpinder and Ani dash off at last to consummate their marriage.

== Cast ==
- Nawazuddin Siddiqui as Pushpinder Tyagi
- Athiya Shetty as Anita "Ani" Awasthi
- Vibha Chibber as Indu Tyagi
- Abhishek Rawat as Hakim Tyagi
- Navni Parihar as Mrs. Awasthi
- Vivek Mishra as Kedar Awasthi
- Karuna Pandey as Prabha Mausi
- Sanjeev Vats as Manohar Tyagi
- Sapna Sand as Pushpinder's Aunt
- Usha Nagar as Pushpinder's Daadi
- Medha Aich as Pushpinder's Chachi
- Sunny Leone as special appearance in song "Battiyan Bujhaado"
- Rahul Chelani as Devansh, Pushpinder's mate

== Production ==
The film was shot extensively in Bhopal, Madhya Pradesh. The highlight of the film was that all actors were speaking the Bundelkhandi language, and had to attend workshop to learn the dialect perfectly.

Director Debamitra Biswal was accused and caught in Rs 32 lakh fraud. A statement petition filed on 6 November 2019 at a court of sub-judge in Saran Chapra Bihar (Suit no 855 of 2019) states that Biswal has admitted to selling the rights of the movie and taking the money fraudulently without the knowledge of production house and studio

== Soundtrack ==
Motichoor Chaknachoor

Soundtrack album by Bharat – Hitarth, Ramji Gulati, Arjuna Harjai, Amjad Nadeem Aamir and Siddhart Amit Bhavsar
- Released: 31 October 2019
- Recorded: 2018–2019
- Studio: Amjad Nadeem Aamir Studio
- Genre: Feature film soundtrack
- Length: 22:42
- Language: Hindi
- Label: Zee Music Company
External audio
- Official Audio Jukebox on YouTube

The film's music is composed by Bharat – Hitarth, Ramji Gulati, Arjuna Harjai, Amjad Nadeem Aamir and Siddhart Amit Bhavsar while lyrics are written by Kumaar, Siddhart Amit Bhavsar and Bharat Menaria.

Track listing
No.	Title	Lyrics	Music	Singer(s)	Length
1.	"Crazy Lagdi"	Kumaar	Amjad Nadeem Aamir	Swaroop Khan	2:37
2.	"Battiyan Bujhaado"	Kumaar	Ramji Gulati	Jyotica Tangri, Ramji Gulati	3:11
3.	"Choti Choti Gal"	Kumaar	Arjuna Harjai	Arjuna Harjai, Yasser Desai	4:38
4.	"Kaise Banegi Sarkar"	Bharat Menaria	Bharat - Hitarth	Vidhya Gopal, Dr Pallavi Shyam Sundar, Deepa Shirodkar	4:13
5.	"Aaj Jaage Rehna"	Siddhart Amit Bhavsar	Siddhart Amit Bhavsar	Himani Kapoor, Siddharth Amit Bhavsar	4:01
6.	"Choti Choti Gal - Reprise"	Kumaar	Arjuna Harjai	Arjuna Harjai, Jyotica Tangri	4:02
Total length:					22:42

== Box office ==
Motichoor Chaknachoor was highly anticipated, but due to its conservative release model, earned little at the box office. However, it was a decent success on Netflix. Despite touching upon important subject like dowry and fascination of NRI lifestyle, the film underperformed commercially.
