= She Move It Like =

2018 song by Badshah

Single by Badshah

from the album ONE (Original Never Ends)
- Language: Punjabi; Hindi
- Released: 10 December 2018
- Genre: Indian hip hop
- Length: 3:05 (Music video); 3:01 (Audio)
- Label: Sony Music India
- Songwriter: Badshah

Music video
- "She Move It Like" on YouTube

"She Move It Like" is a song by Badshah from the album ONE. The song features Warina Hussain, released by Sony Music India on 10 December 2018.

== Background ==
The song was released as a single from the album ONE (Original Never Ends). Sung and penned by Badshah. Music video of the song features afghan actress Warina Hussain. The song was released by Sony Music India on 10 December 2018 via YouTube and other music streaming services.

== Reception ==
The song was very popular at the time of its release. Its music video crossed 11 million views in a day. As of January 2025 it has over 600 million views on YouTube.
