= Amrit Maan =

Indian actor and singer in Punjabi cinema

- Maan in 2018

Background information
- Born: 10 June; Goniana Mandi, Punjab, India
- Origin: Punjab, India
- Genres: Bhangra; Pop; Hip hop
- Occupations: Singer; songwriter; actor
- Instrument: Vocal
- Years active: (2014 –present)
- Labels: White Hill Music; Bamb Beats; Speed Records

Amrit Maan is an Indian singer, songwriter and actor associated with Punjabi film and music. He rose to fame after the release of his debut, Desi Da Drum in 2015 and "Bambiha Bole" in 2020. He is also known for his debut film Channa Mereya.

== Early life ==
Maan was born in Goniana Mandi, Punjab, India. He did his master's degree in Technology in Software Engineering from Swami Vivekananda Institute of Engineering and Technology, Ramnagar, Mohali.

== Career ==
Maan started his career in 2014 as a songwriter. His first song Jatt Fire Karda sung by Punjabi singer Diljit Dosanjh, was a big hit. He wrote many songs like Yaar Jundi De. After getting success as a lyricist, he released his debut song Desi Da Drum. Other notable songs of Mann include Kaali Camaro, Bamb Jatt and Peg Di Washna.

== Discography ==
=== Albums ===
Title	Album details
All Bamb	Release: 2021; Music: Desi Crew, Ikky, Dr Zeus; Label: Speed Records; Format: Digital download, streaming

=== Extended Plays ===
Title	EP details
Xpensive	Release: 7 December 2022; Music: Desi Crew, Avvy Sra, Mxrci; Label: Speed Records; Format: Digital download, streaming

== Singles discography ==
=== As lead artist ===
Song	Year	Music	Peak chart position			Label	Album	Notes
Song	Year	Music	NZ Hot	UK Asian	UK Punjabi	Label	Album	Notes
Desi Da Drum	2015	DJ Flow	—	37		Speed Records		
Muchh Te Mashook	2015	JSL				Speed Records		
Kaali Camaro	2016	Deep Jandu	—			Speed Records		
Pagg Di Pooni	2016	Gurmeet Singh				Speed Records	Vaapsi soundtrack	
Shikaar (with Jazzy B & Kaur B)	2016	Preet Hundal	—	5		Speed Records		Won Best Duo/Group Award
Sach Te Supna	2016	Gags2dioz				Speed Records		
Akh Da Nishana	2016	Deep Jandu	—			Speed Records		
Bamb Jatt (with Jasmine Sandlas)	2017	DJ Flow		6		White Hill Music		
Lalkara	2017	Deep Jandu	—			White Hill Music	Channa Mereya soundtrack	
Peg Di Waashna	2017	DJ Flow		12		Speed Records		
Guerilla War (featuring DJ Goddess)	2017	Deep Jandu	—	14		Speed Records		
Logo Muchh De (with Mannat Noor)	2018	Gurmeet Singh				T-Series	from Laung Laachi soundtrack	
Trending Nakhra	2018	Intense	—	9		Bamb Beats		
Difference	2018	Ikky		3		Bamb Beats		
Pariyaan Toh Sohni	2018	Ikky		33		Crown Records		
Blood Wich Tu	2018	Deep Jandu	—			Lokdhun Punjabi	Aate Di Chidi soundtrack	
Marzi De Malak	2018	Deep Jandu				Lokdhun Punjabi	Aate Di Chidi soundtrack	
Love You Ni Mutiyare	2018	Intense				Lokdhun Punjabi	Aate Di Chidi soundtrack	
Peg	2018	Badshah, Jay K	—			Sony Music India	Do Dooni Panj soundtrack	
Haunsla	2018	Badshah, Meet Sehra	—	—	—	Sony Music India	Do Dooni Panj soundtrack	
Jacktan Lightan Waalian (with Badshah)	2018	Badshah	—			Sony Music India	Do Dooni Panj soundtrack	
Collarbone	2018	Desi Crew				Bamb Beats		Featuring Himanshi Khurana
German Gun (featuring DJ Flow)	2019	DJ Flow	—			Speed Records		
Mithi Mithi (with Jasmine Sandlas)	2019	Intense	—	2		Crown Records		
The King	2019	Intense	—	11	13	Speed Records		
Jatt Fattey Chakk	2019	Desi Crew	—	—	—	Speed Records		
Combination	2019	Dr. Zeus	—	32	12			
My Moon (featuring The PropheC)	2019	The PropheC				Planet Recordz		
Aakad	2019	Desi Crew				Bamb Beats		
Subah Jatt Da	2020	Gur Sidhu				Bamb Beats		
Lifestyle (with Gurlez Akhtar)	2020	Intense			5	Next Level		
Bambiha Bole (with Sidhu Moose Wala)	2020	Ikky Music	10	1	1	Sidhu Moose Wala		
Asi Oh Hune Aa	2020	Ikky Music	—			Bamb Beats		
Edaan Ni (feat. Bohemia)	2020	Gur Sidhu	—			Bang Musix		
Sira E Hou (feat. Nimrat Khaira)	2021	Desi Crew		5	3	Speed Records	All Bamb	
Kaala Ghoda (feat. Divine)	2021	Ikky				Speed Records	All Bamb	
Maa	2021	Desi Crew				Cocktail Music		
Parhaune (with Prem Dhillon)	2021	San B			7	Sidhu Moose Wala		
Mitha Mitha (with R Nait)	2021	Desi Crew				Speed Records		
Bapu	2021	Desi Crew				Cocktail Music		
80 90 (with (with Ikky & Garry Sandhu)	2021	Ikky Music			11	4N Records		
All Bamb (with Gurlez Akhtar)	2021	Ikky (Ikwinder Singh)			11	Speed Records	All Bamb	
Bismillah	2021	Dr Zeus		5	3	Speed Records	All Bamb	
3 Ardhi	2021	Desi Crew				Speed Records	All Bamb	
France (with Gurlez Akhtar)	2021	Desi Crew				Speed Records	All Bamb	
Rubicon (with Mehar Vaani)	2021	Desi Crew				Speed Records	All Bamb	
President	2021	Desi Crew				Humble Music	Warning soundtrack	
Moge Di Barfi	2021	Jatinder Shah	—			Humble Music	Shava Ni Girdhari Lal soundtrack	
Jatt Flex	2022	Desi Crew		39		Cocktail Music		
Kikli	2022	Desi Crew		39		Bamb Beats	Babbar soundtrack	
Trouble Maker	2022	Desi Crew	—			Bamb Beats	Babbar soundtrack	
Babbar Anthem	2022	Desi Crew				Bamb Beats	Babbar soundtrack	
Hanji Hanji (featuring The PropheC)	2022	Ezu		13	8	White Hill Music		
Detail	2022	Desi Crew				Amrit Maan		
Supreme	2022	Mxrci		40		Speed Records	Xpensive EP	
Burberry (featuring Shipra Goyal)	2022	Avvy Sra				Speed Records	Xpensive EP	
Medicine	2022	Desi Crew				Speed Records	Xpensive EP	
Dont You Know	2022	Mxrci	—			Speed Records	Xpensive EP	
Shehzada (with Amrit Maan & Kulbir Jhinjer)	2023	Mix Singh						

=== As featured artist ===
Title	Year	Music	Peak chart positions		Label	Album
Title	Year	Music	UK Asian	UK Punjabi	Label	Album
Pink Pink Addiyan (Jigar featuring Amrit Maan)	2020	Desi Crew			Bamb Beats	
Aeyan Kiven (Gippy Grewal featuring Amrit Maan)	2020	Ikky	36	20	Geet Mp3	The Main Man
Girlfriend (DJ Flow featuring Amrit Maan)	2021	DJ Flow			White Hill Music	
10 Outta 10 (Shipra Goyal feat. Amrit Maan)	2022	DJ Flow			Blue Beats Studios	

== Songwriting discography ==
As lyricist (songwriter)
Title	Year	Artist	Music	Label	Album
Jatt Fire Karda	2015	Diljit Dosanjh	Preet Hundal	Panj Aab Records	
Follow	2015	Inder Chahal, Whistle	DJ Flow	Speed Records	
Yaar Jundi De	2015	Ammy Virk	Bhinda Aujla	Patiala Shahi Records	
Haan Kargi	2015	Ammy Virk	Gupz Sehra	Lokhdun Punjabi	
Budhwaar	2015	Gippy Grewal	Jatinder Shah	Saga Hits	‘Faraar’ soundtrack
Etwaar	2015	Jazzy B, Fateh	Dr Zeus	Saga Hits	‘Faraar’ soundtrack
Seyaal	2015	Jass Bajwa	Gupz Sehra	Crown Records	Jatt Sauda
Chach Bhatija	2015	Jass Bajwa	Gupz Sehra	Crown Records	Jatt Sauda
Peg Laune Aa	2016	Gippy Grewal	Aman Hayer	Speed Records	Desi Rockstar 2
DIl De Raaje	2017	Jass Bajwa	Deep Jandu	Next Level Music	
Born To Shine	2020	Diljit Dosanjh	Desi Crew	Famous Studios	G.O.A.T.
Akh Laal Jaat Di	2020	Diljit Dosanjh	Ikky Music	Famous Studios	G.O.A.T.
2 Seater	2020	Gippy Grewal	Ikky Music	Geet Mp3	The Main Man
Gun Te Gulab	2020	Gippy Grewal	Ikky Music	Geet Mp3	The Main Man
Piche Piche	2020	Gippy Grewal, Bohemia	Ikky Music	Geet Mp3	The Main Man

== Filmography ==
Key
†	Denotes films that have not yet been released.

Year	Film	Role	Notes
2017	Channa Mereya	Balli Dhillon	Nominated for Best Debut Actor Filmfare Awards Punjabi/Nominated for Best Negative Role at PTC Punjabi Film Awards
2018	Laung Laachi	Singer Jagtaar Maan	
2018	Aate Di Chidi	Vikram	With Neeru Bajwa
2019	Do Dooni Panj		
2022	Babbar	Zorawar	Directed by amar hundal

=== Music videos ===
Year	Title	Singer	Lyrics	Music	Notes
2021	Tere Laare	Afsana Khan	Happy Raikoti	Desi Crew	With Wamiqa Gabbi

=== Film Songs ===
Year	Film	Title	Singer	Lyrics	Music	Notes
2025	Jaat	"Jaat Theme Song"	Amrit Maan	Amrit Maan	S. Thaman	
