= Dil Hai Hindustani =

- Also known as: Dii humara hindustani
- Genre: Reality; Talent show
- Created by: Ranjeet Thakur; Hemant Ruprell
- Creative director: Vibhor Ratna
- Presented by: Raghav Juyal and Mukti Mohan
- Starring: See below
- Judges: Karan Johar (Season 1); Badshah (Season 1-2); Shekhar Ravjiani (Season 1); Shalmali Kholgade (Season 1); Sunidhi Chauhan (Season 2); Pritam (Season 2)
- Country of origin: India
- Original language: Hindi
- No. of seasons: 02
- No. of episodes: 25

Production
- Producers: Ranjeet Thakur; Hemant Ruprell
- Production locations: Mumbai, India
- Editor: Kumar Priyadarshi (Season 2)
- Camera setup: Multi-camera
- Production company: Frames Production

Original release
- Network: Star Plus
- Release: 7 January – 1 April 2017

Dil Hai Hindustani is an Indian Hindi reality singing talent show, which was scheduled to premiere sometime in December 2016 and has been broadcast on Star Plus. The series aired on weekends' nights. The series is produced by Frames Production of Ranjeet Thakur and Hemant Ruprell. The uniqueness about this show is that it allows competitors, not from only India, but from all over the world to compete. The winner of first Season was Haitham Mohammed Rafi and the winner of second season is Akshay Dhawan.

== Plot ==
Budding singers from any age group will be given a chance to sign up for it.

== Top 5 (Finalists) ==
Winners of Dil Hai Hindustani Season 1

Contestants	City/Country	Singing category	Status
Haitham Mohammed Rafi	Oman, Asia	Solo	WINNER
Euphony Official & Barnali Hota	Kalyan, India	Group	2nd Position
Shashwati & Ankita	Kolkata, India	Duet	3rd Position
Simran Raj	Delhi, India	Solo	4th Position
Nastya Saraswati, Ajay, Amritanshu	Saint Petersburg, Russia and MP UP, India	Group	5th Position

Winners of Dil Hai Hindustani Season 2

Contestants	City/Country	Singing category	Status
Akshay Dhaawan	Ludhiana, India	Solo (Rap)	WINNER
Mountain Souls ft. Gaurdeep	Various, India	Group	2nd Position
Soumya Sharma	Vidisha, India	Solo	3rd Position
Radha and Divyansh	Shrawasti district and Jaipur, India	Solo, BeatBoxing	4th Position

== Winners ==
The winner of season 1 was Haitham Mohammed Rafi from Oman, with the runner up being Euphony Official & Barnali Hota. The winner of season 2 was Akshay Dhawan, with the runner up being Mountain Souls f.t Gaurdeep.
