= Shiwani Saini =

Indian actress

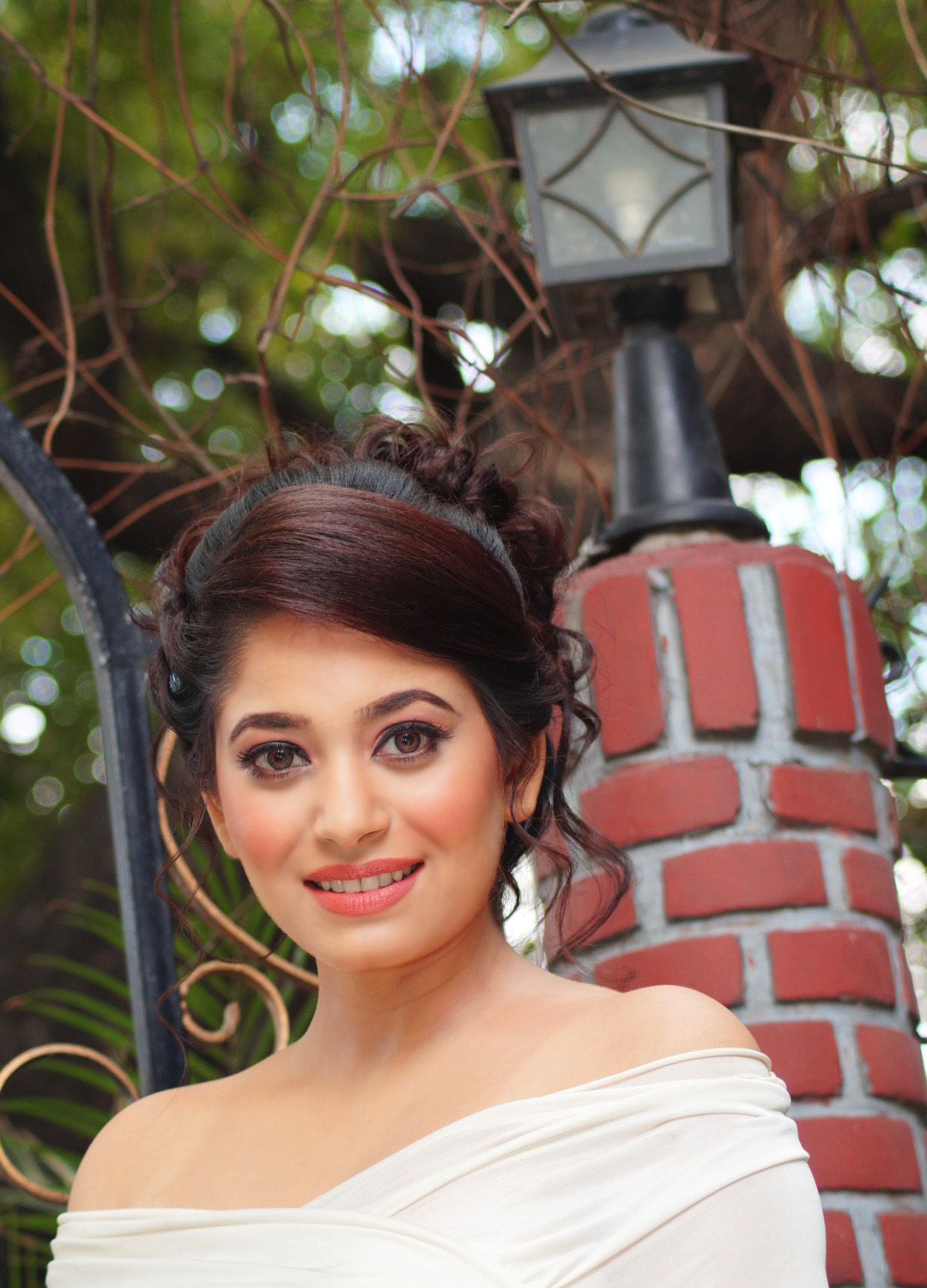
- Visit as Chief Guest at Exhibition in New Delhi
- Born: 31 December 1988 (age 37)
- Occupations: Actress; model
- Years active: 2014 – present

Shiwani Saini (born 31 December 1988) is an Indian actress and model who appears in Hindi and Punjabi language films. She made her debut with the Punjabi film Happy Go Lucky.

== Early life ==
Saini has previously worked as a fashion designer. Beyond acting, Saini is known to have a passion for biking.

== Career ==
Saini made her film debut in the Harry Baweja's Punjabi language film Happy Go Lucky. Subsequently, she was selected for the role of Sarabjit's elder daughter, Swapan, in the Hindi language biographical drama film Sarabjit alongside Aishwarya Rai Bachchan Randeep Hooda and Richa Chadha (2016).

She has worked in the Hollywood film 5 Weddings as Devika; with Nargis Fakhri and Raj Kumar Rao. Next she was seen in Hindi movie Jai Mummy Di produced by LUV Films released in 2020. Next, she will be seen in Punjabi film Ikko Mikke with Satinder Sartaaj and Aditi Sharma, worldwide releasing on 13 March 2020.

== Filmography ==
Year	Title	Role	Notes	Ref.
2014	Happy Go Lucky	Preeti	Punjabi	
2016	Sarabjit	Swapandeep Kaur	Hindi	
2018	5 Weddings	Devika	English	
2020	Jai Mummy Di	Shruti	Hindi	
2020	Ikko~Mikke	Neeru	Punjabi	
