= Goniana =

- Town
- Location in Punjab, India Goniana (India)
- Coordinates: 30.3229°N 74.9234°E
- Country: India
- State: Punjab
- District: Bathinda

Population (2001)
  - Total: 12,812

Languages
  - Official: Punjabi
- Time zone: UTC+5:30 (IST)
- PIN: 151201
- Telephone code: 164
- Vehicle registration: PB 03

Goniana is a Suburban town in Bathinda District in the Indian state of Punjab. It is located about 12 km from Bathinda City on National Highway 54 (NH 54) It is also known as ‘’’Goniana Mandi’’’.

== Demographics ==
Goniana Mandi is a suburb town of Bathinda city in the state of Punjab, India. The language spoken in this town is Punjabi. This is one of the growing towns in Bathinda district. According to the 2001 India census, Goniana Mandi had a population of 22012. Males constitute 52% of the population and females 48%. Goniana Mandi has an average literacy rate of 71%, which is higher than the national average of 69.5%: male literacy is 85%, and female literacy is 86%. In Goniana, 12% of the population is under 6 years of age.

The table below shows the population of different religious groups in Goniana town, as of 2011 census.

Population by religious groups in Goniana town, 2011 census
Religion	Total	Female	Male
Hindu	9,888	4,575	5,313
Sikh	5,213	2,445	2,768
Muslim	79	23	56
Christian	5	3	2
Buddhist	1	0	1
Other religions	1	1	0
Not stated	21	11	10
Total	15,208	7,058	8,150

Several temples, widely known across the state, are located in Goniana; these include Tikana Bhai Jagta Ji Gurudwara, Durga Mata Temple, Ichhapuran Hanumaan temple and Guru Ravidas Mandir.

== Other information ==
Key	Value
Full Name	Goniana Mandi
Short Name	GNA
District	Bathinda
State	Punjab
Country	India
Latitude (decimal degrees)	30.3167
Longitude (decimal degrees)	74.9
DMS Latitude	30*19’00"
DMS Longitude	74*54’00"
Universal Transverse Mercator	DP95
Joint Operation Graphics	NH43-06

== Notable people ==
- Amrit Maan
- Roop Records

== See also ==
- Bathinda
- Punjab
- India
- Sikhism
- Hinduism
