= Aastha Gill =

Indian playback singer (born 1991)

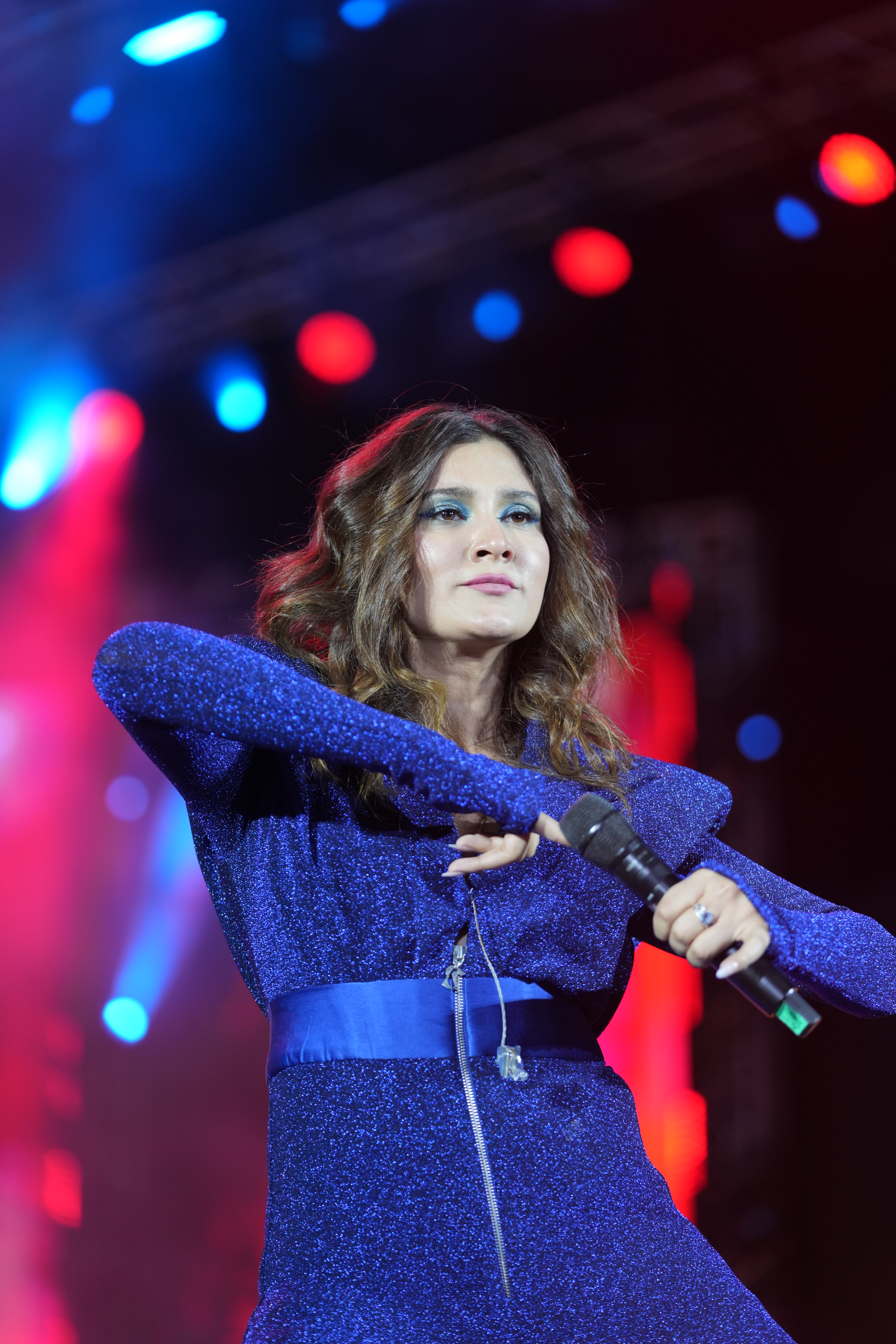
- Aastha Gill performing live
- Born: 24 June 1991 (age 35); Delhi, India
- Occupations: Singer, songwriter
- Years active: 2014–present
- Musical career
- Genres: Pop; Bollywood music

Aastha Gill (born 24 June 1991) is an Indian singer and songwriter known for her work in Bollywood and Punjabi pop music. She gained popularity for her contributions to film soundtracks, including "Dhup Chik" from Fugly (2014), "Abhi Toh Party Shuru Hui Hai" from Khoobsurat (2014) and "DJ Wale Babu" (2015). Aastha has also released several successful singles and collaborated with various artists.

== Early life and education ==
Aastha was born to Jaspal Singh and raised in Delhi, India. She worked in a recording studio from a young age but initially did not envision a career in the music industry.

Despite having a passion for music, Aastha pursued a more conventional career path. She completed a bachelor's degree in journalism from Vivekananda School of Journalism and Mass Communication, New Delhi, and subsequently worked at an advertising firm and a news channel. Aastha's transition to a music career began when rapper Raftaar, whom she knew from college, offered her the opportunity to record vocals for a Bollywood film. This led her to leave her position at the news channel and pursue music professionally. She made her debut with the song "Dhup Chik" from the film Fugly (2014).

== Career ==
Aastha made her debut with the song "Dhup Chik" from the film Fugly (2014). She gained further recognition for her vocal performance in "Abhi Toh Party Shuru Hui Hai" from the film Khoobsurat (2014). Aastha released her first independent single, "Buzz", in 2018, featuring rapper Badshah.

Aastha has released several successful releases, including "DJ Waley Babu" (2015), a feature with Badshah, which garnered significant popularity. Her other notable releases include "Buzz" (2018), featuring Priyank Sharma, "Abhi Toh Party Shuru Hu Hai" (2014), featuring Badshah, and "Naagin" (2019), featuring Akasa.

In 2021, Aastha participated in the eleventh season of the reality television show Fear Factor: Khatron Ke Khiladi. She has also served as a judge on the music reality shows Breakout Star by Universal Music India and Smule's 123 Riyaz Season 2. Aastha has made guest appearances on music competition programs such as Indian Idol and The Voice India.

In 2022, Aastha received two nominations for the Listeners' Choice Award in the Independent Music Category at the Mirchi Music Awards for her tracks "Bachpan Ka Pyaar" and "Paani Paani".

Aastha has performed at major music festivals and events, including Viral Festival Asia (2016), Global Citizen India (2021), Electric Tour with Badshah, Dream Tour with Karan Johar, Fusion Tour with Akshay Kumar (2015), and Coca-Cola Arena (2023).

In 2024, Aastha appeared on the SonyLIV's streaming show "Million Dollar Listing India," where she documented her search for a dream home in Mumbai.

== Discography ==
=== Soundtrack film albums ===
Year	Film	Song	Co-singer	Ref.
2014	Fugly	"Dhup Chik"	Badshah, Raftaar	
2014	Khoobsoorat	"Abhi Toh Party Shuru Hui Hai"	Badshah	
2018	Blackmail	"Happy Happy"	Badshah	
2018	Stree	"Kamariya"	Sachin–Jigar	
2018	Namaste England	"Proper Patola"	Diljit Dosanjh, Badshah	
2020	Indoo Ki Jawaani	"Heelein Toot Gayi"	Badshah	
2023	Farrey	"Ghar Pe Party Hai"	Badshah, MellowD	

=== Singles ===
Year	Title	Co-singer	Ref.
2013	"Freedom"	Badshah	
2015	"DJ Waley Babu"	Badshah	
2016	"Rayzr Mera Swag"	Badshah	
2018	"Buzz"	Badshah	
2018	"Karee Ja"	Badshah	
2018	"Heartless"	Badshah	
2018	"Nain"	Badshah	
2018	"Kareja (Kare Ja)"	Badshah	
2019	"Saara India"	N/A	
2019	"Jeetega Saara India"	N/A	
2019	"Naagin"	Akasa	
2020	"Hermosa"	D Soldierz	
2020	"Crazy Lady"	N/A	
2021	"Drunk n High"	Mellow D	
2021	"Paani Paani"	Badshah	
2021	"Jaanam Samjha Karo 2.0"	Parampara Thakur	
2021	"Bachpan Ka Pyaar"	Badshah, Sahdev Dirdo, Rico	
2021	"Saawariya"	Kumar Sanu	
2022	"Shringaar"	Akasa Singh, Raftaar	
2022	"Balma"	Bali	
2022	"Fantasy"	Sukh-E	
2022	"God Damn"	–	
2023	"Kyun"	–	
2023	"Ve Mai Kehna"	-	
2024	"Nazar"	–	

== Television ==
Year	Title	Role	Notes	Language
2021	Fear Factor: Khatron Ke Khiladi 11	Contestant	12th place (evicted in 4th week)	Hindi
2022	Smule's 123 Riyaz Season 2	Judge		Hindi
2024	Million Dollar Listing India	–	–	English
2024	Breakout Star by Universal Music India	Judge		Hindi
2025	I-Popstar	Judge		Multilingual
