= Isha Rikhi =

Indian actress and model

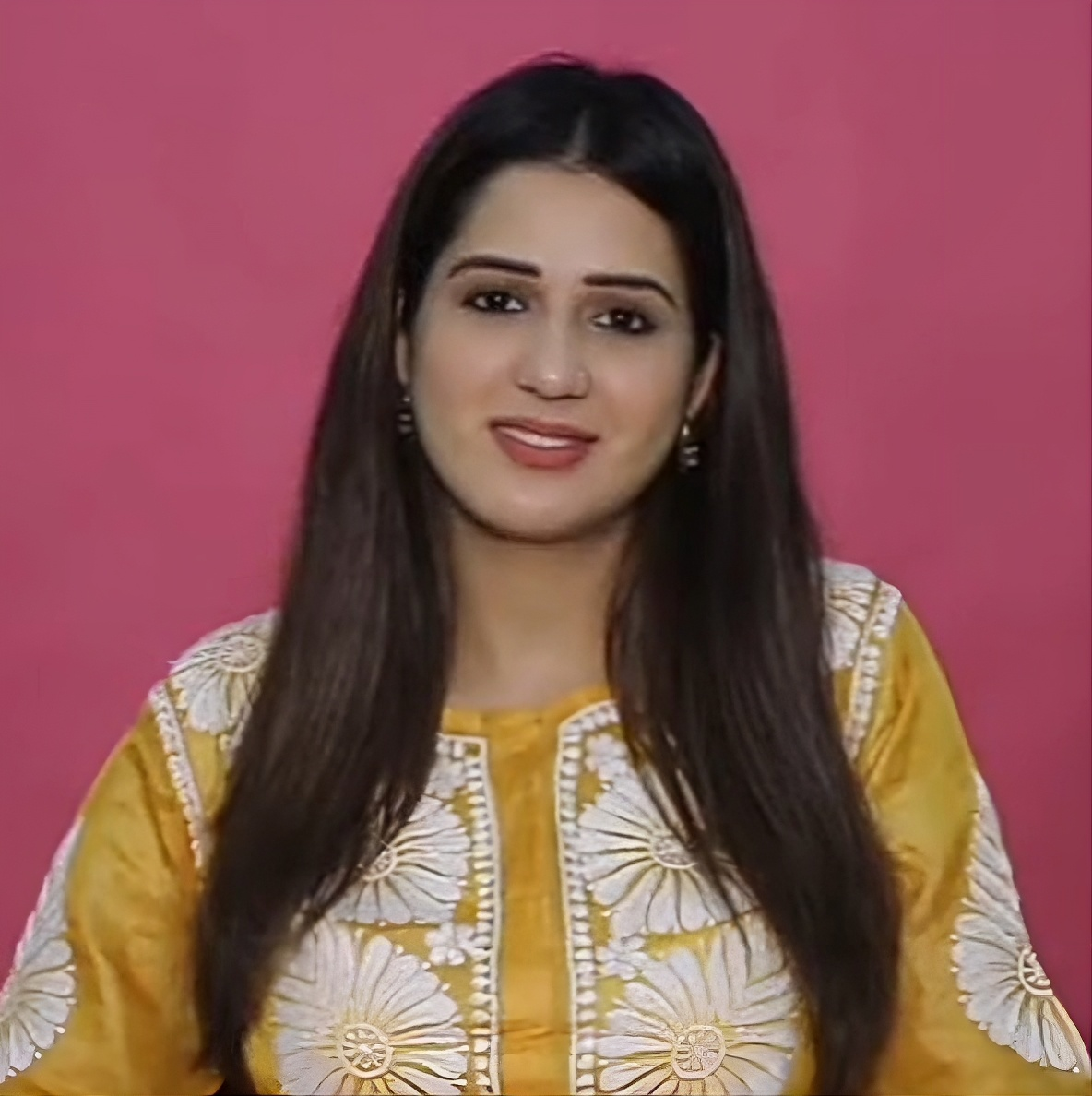
- Rikhi in 2024
- Born: 9 September 1993 (age 33); Chandigarh
- Occupations: Actress; model
- Years active: 2012–present
- Height: 1.68 m (5 ft 6 in)
- Spouse: Badshah (m. 2026; div. 2026)
- Parents: Pradeep Kumar Rikhi (father); Poonam Rikhi (mother)

Isha Rikhi is an Indian actress and model. She made her screen debut with Punjabi film Jatt Boys Putt Jattan De (2013). She was part of Happy Go Lucky. She then appeared in Bade Changay Ne Mere Yaar Kaminey and What the Jatt in 2014 and 2015 respectively. In 2016, she played a role in the movie Ardaas. She debuted in the Hindi film industry in 2018 with the film Nawabzaade.

== Personal life ==
In 2026, Rikhi married rapper Badshah. Her marriage was announced through photos that were shared by her mother and later confirmed by Rikhi herself. They divorced in the same year.

== Filmography ==
Year	Film	Role	Notes
2012	Jatt & Juliet	Twinkle	Guest appearance
2013	Jatt Boys Putt Jatta De	Sirat	Punjabi film
2014	Happy Go Lucky	Sirat	Punjabi film
2014	Bade Changay Ne Mere Yaar Kaminey	Simran	Punjabi film
2015	What the Jatt!!	Sapna	Punjabi film
2016	Ardaas	Mannat	Punjabi film
2016	Desi Munde	Simran	Punjabi film
2018	Nawabzaade	Sheetal	Hindi film
2019	Mindo Taseeldarni	Jeeto	Punjabi film
2026	Bigg Boss 20	Contestant	Hindi reality show
