= Badshah (rapper) =

Indian rapper and singer (born 1985)

- Badshah in 2017
- Born: Aditya Prateek Singh Sisodia; 19 November 1985 (age 40); Delhi, India
- Other name: Badboyshah
- Education: Punjab Engineering College
- Occupations: Rapper; singer; songwriter; music producer; filmmaker; entrepreneur
- Years active: 2006-present
- Television: MTV Hustle; India's Got Talent; Indian Idol; Dil Hai Hindustani
- Spouses: Jasmine Masih (m. 2012; div. 2020) Isha Rikhi (m. 2026; sep. 2026)
- Children: 1
- Musical career
- Origin: Delhi, Chandigarh
- Genres: Pop rap; underground rap; synthwave; Hip-Hop; Desi hip hop; Bollywood
- Labels: Sony Music Entertainment; Universal Music Group
- Formerly of: Mafia Mundeer

Aditya Prateek Singh, (Note: Badshah has often referred to his full name as Aditya Prateek Singh Sisodiya; however, he confirmed that his name on passport does not have Sisodiya in a The Lallantop interview. His business filings also do not end with Sisodiya. Wikipedia's introduction uses only the legal name.) better known professionally as Badshah, is an Indian media personality who is active as a rapper, singer-songwriter, music composer, judge on reality television and businessman. He used to produce music as well. As such, he is influential in both Indian hip-hop and Hindi film music. He is widely credited with helping Indian hip-hop music reach global mainstream audiences.

Badshah gained widespread recognition after his 2012 single, "Saturday Saturday", was featured in the soundtrack of the 2014 movie, Humpty Sharma Ki Dulhania. His notable works in Bollywood films include "Abhi Toh Party Shuru Hui Hai" from Khoobsurat, "Kar Gayi Chull" from Kapoor and Sons, "Garmi" from Street Dancer 3D, "Naina" from Crew, and "Proper Patola" from Namaste England, among others. He has also collaborated with international artists such as J Balvin and Tainy for the song "Voodoo", with the remix of the song featuring a guest verse from Lil Baby.

Badshah has appeared as a judge on MTV Hustle, Indian Idol, Dil Hai Hindustani, India's Got Talent, and India's Got Latent.

== Early life and education ==
Prior to becoming a full-time musician he enrolled as a student of civil engineering at Punjab Engineering College (PEC), Chandigarh, where he was exposed to new Punjabi music which prompted him to take on rap writing.

== Career ==
=== 2006-2012: Career beginnings, Soda Whiskey and Mafia Mundeer ===
Badshah started his career in the music industry with the name "Cool Equal", but then changed his name to Badshah on the Indian rapper Yo Yo Honey Singh's advice as according to Badshah, Singh thought that "he lived like a 'Badshah' (transl. king) i.e. he would wake up or call whenever he wanted to and according to his own liking". In his 2024 interview with The Lallantop, Badshah claims initially giving Singh 2 lakh rupees, followed by an additional 3 lakh rupees for doing the music production for his debut English-language album and subsequently, 6 lakh rupees for fulfilling the budget for the music video of the song "Get Up Jawani", which was shot in 2009. The track became a part of Singh's debut album International Villager which launched in 11th of November 2011, with the release of its music video in April 2012.

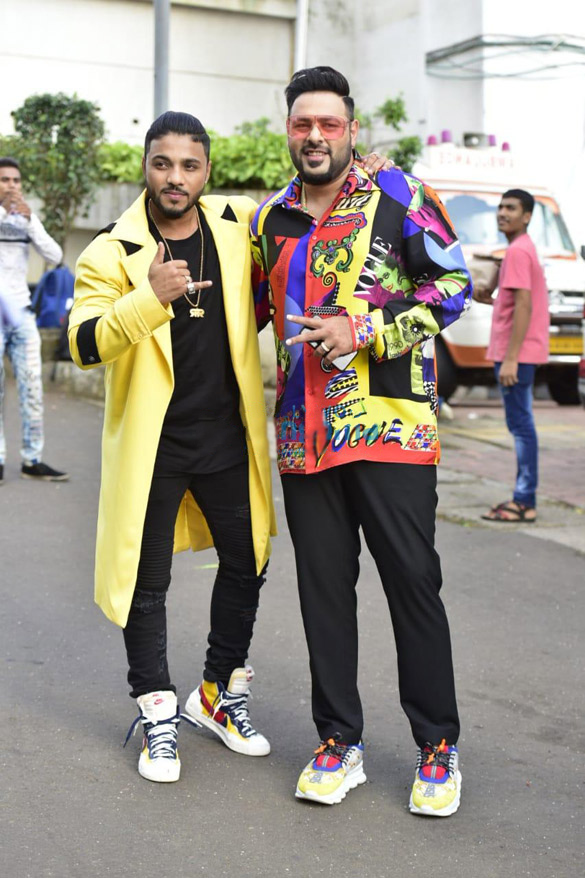
Badshah & Raftaar, both of whom were former members of Mafia Mundeer

In late 2011-early 2012, he split from Mafia Mundeer and Singh due to credit-related problems. In an earlier interview with Raaj Jones in 2015, Badshah claims to have co-written many tracks with Singh, including "Brown Rang", the rap segment for "Angreji Beat" and also, for Singh & Raj Brar's 2008 track, "Chandigarh De Nazareyan Ne Patteya". Badshah claims to have written/co-written almost all tracks for Singh, till the latter's album International Villager. Badshah reiterated his claim in the interview with The Lallantop to have written the track "Brown Rang" and the rap segment for the track "Angreji Beat" for Singh, which the latter denied. Singh, in an interview with the same media outlet, has denied that Badshah was ever a part of "Mafia Mundeer" and instead states that Badshah was just a client for him.

=== 2012-2020: Mainstream breakout, Original Never Ends and acting debut ===
He broke into the mainstream after his 2012 single, "Saturday Saturday", was featured in the soundtrack of the 2014 movie, Humpty Sharma Ki Dulhania.

His track "Abhi Toh Party Shuru Hui Hai" alongside Aastha Gill and Bollywood actor Sonam Kapoor in the music video was featured in the 2014 Disney film, Khoobsurat. The track became a blockbuster and has since crossed one billion views on YouTube. In 2015, he collaborated with Aastha Gill again, on the song, "DJ Waley Babu", which went viral and became a commercial hit. He further featured on the track, "Wakhra Swag" alongside Navv Inder, which also became a commercial hit.

Badshah released his debut studio album, O.N.E. (Original Never Ends), on August 17, 2018, preceded by the release of two lead singles "Mercy" and "Heartless", the former of which crossed 21 million views on YouTube in a week.

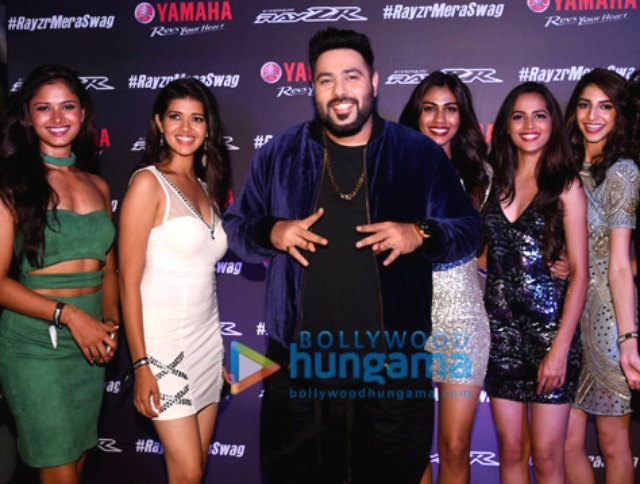
Badshah & Miss Diva 2017 contestants at Yamaha music video launch

His 2019 song "Paagal" reached 74.8 million views on YouTube within 24 hours which would have set the record for the most-viewed video in 24 hours on YouTube. Badshah's label, Sony Music, confirmed that they had used the help of advertisements from Google AdSense to promote the song. An explanation from YouTube not acknowledging the record was because Badshah's record label Sony Music India had purchased advertisements from Google and YouTube that embedded the video or directed fans to it in some way, a common practice in the global music industry.

He made his acting debut in August 2019 in the movie, Khandaani Shafakhana.

=== 2020-2023: The Power of Dreams of a Kid and Retropanda - Part 1 EP ===
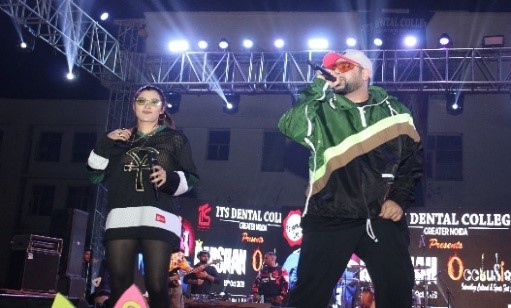
Aastha Gill & Badshah Occlusion Fest, 2019

On 7 August 2020, the rapper released an alternative hip-hop album, The Power of Dreams of a Kid, which had eight tracks and included features from various artists such as Lisa Mishra, Sikander Kahlon, Fotty Seven, Bali, and music producer Andy Grewal. According to Badshah, the album dealt with the themes of his musical journey. The mixing and mastering of the album was handled by Aditya Dev.

His song "Genda Phool" was released by Sony Music India in 2020. It sampled a Bengali folk song "Boro Loker Biti Lo". Ratan Kahar, a Bengali artist, claimed to be the original writer and composer of the folk song. Though Badshah later released a statement saying that it was a traditional Baul folk song which was not copyrighted, since folk music does not fall under copyright protections and is thus in the public domain.

Badshah collaborated with Aastha Gill for the song "Pani Pani". The music video featured him alongside Jacqueline Fernandez. He further released the Bhojpuri version of the song, and rapped in the Bhojpuri language, alongside Khesari Lal Yadav. The Bhojpuri version got more than one million views in less than an hour and became the first Bhojpuri song to do so.

Badshah released a four-track EP, Retropanda - Part 1, on 14 March 2022. The EP featured the track "Jugnu" featuring Nikhita Gandhi, which has amassed over 200 million streams on Spotify.

=== 2023-present: 3:00 AM Sessions and Ek Tha Raja albums ===
In 2023, Badshah released his third studio album, 3:00 AM Sessions, which featured Karan Aujla on the first track. According to Badshah, the project represented "his unfiltered and vulnerable side".

A year later, he released his fourth studio album, Ek Tha Raja on 18 March 2024, through Universal Music Group. It features several artists, including Divine, Raftaar, Karan Aujla, Ikka, Dino James, Nora Fatehi, Raga, Seedhe Maut, Aastha Gill, Arijit Singh, MC Stan, KR$NA and Nikhita Gandhi. He also announced the Paagal World Tour 2024.

In 2025, Badshah announced his EP Fitoor, which was branded as his first independent project. All the songs were released as singles before being released together as an EP on August 16, 2025. The project was his first one to include no features. The track "Galiyon Ke Ghalib" attracted attention for its incisive lyricism and Badshah debuting as a dancer in the music video.

In December 2025, Maybach Icons of Luxury announced a limited-edition eyewear collaboration with Badshah, making him the brand's first South Asian creative partner. The capsule included five optical and sunglass models co-designed by Badshah; rimless “The Artist III” frames with curved titanium, sound-wave-inspired temples, and “The King III” aviators in Camouflage, Snow Camouflage, and Tigers of India motifs. The collection was released via Eternity Lifestyles in India and Maybach Eyewear retailers worldwide, with prices starting at US$2,850.

Badshah participated in the NBA All-Star Celebrity Game in February 2026. He featured on the song "Inaam" by Jasleen Royal in June 2026. At the 10th edition of the All About Music conference in Mumbai, Badshah announced his fifth studio album, Gentle Monster, scheduled to release in 2026.

== Controversies ==
Badshah also faced controversy following the release of the song "Gone Girl", as several listeners interpreted certain lyrics as a diss directed at Yo Yo Honey Singh, which Badshah later acknowledged.

In March 2026, Badshah was embroiled in a controversy over his Haryanvi song "Tateeree". The track attracted criticism for its allegedly objectionable lyrics and visuals. An FIR was registered in Panchkula, Haryana, under the provisions related to obscene content and representation of women. Following the backlash, Badshah issued a public apology and the music video as well as audio was removed from all streaming platforms. The song was re-released as "Tateeree Phir Se", with the allegedly objectionable content in the song removed.

Following a plea filed by Hindu Shakti Dal in March 2026, Yo Yo Honey Singh's 2006 collaboration with Badshah, titled "Volume 1", was ordered a takedown by the Delhi High Court, from all social media and music streaming platforms, citing its derogatory nature towards women.

== Personal life ==
He married Jasmine Masih in 2012. They have one daughter together, born in 2017. They divorced in 2020.

In 2026, Badshah married actress Isha Rikhi which was disclosed by Rikhi's mother through an Instagram post and later confirmed by Rikhi herself. They separated in the same year.

Badshah has also ventured into the hospitality industry with several diverse dining experiences. He co-owns Dragonfly Experience in Delhi and Mumbai, and has launched three upscale restaurants in Chandigarh; Sago Spice Symphony, Seville, and Sidera. In 2025, he also introduced Badboy Pizza, a QSR brand in Mumbai.

Badshah is a teetotaler.

== Discography ==
=== Albums and EPs ===
Title	Producer(s)	Writer(s)	Label	Language(s)	Release date
O.N.E. (Original Never Ends)	Badshah, Sez on the Beat, The Boss	Badshah, Various Artists	Sony Music India	Hindi, Punjabi	17 August 2018
The Power Of Dreams Of A Kid	Badshah, Andy Grewal	Badshah, Various Artists	Badshah	Hindi, Punjabi, English, Haryanvi	7 August 2020
Retropanda - Part 1	Hiten	Badshah, Aastha Gill, Nikitha Gandi	Universal Music India	Hindi, Punjabi	14 March 2022
3:00 AM Sessions	Hiten	Badshah, Various Artists	Universal Music India	Hindi, Punjabi	7 February 2023
Ek Tha Raja	Badshah, Hiten	Badshah, Various Artists	Universal Music India	Hindi, Punjabi, English	18 March 2024
Fitoor	Badshah, Hiten	Badshah	Universal Music India	Hindi, Punjabi, English	16 August 2025

=== Bollywood music ===
†	Denotes films that have not yet been released

Year	Movie	Song	Singer(s)/co-singer(s)	Composer(s)	Language	Label	Ref.
2014	Humpty Sharma Ki Dulhania	"Saturday Saturday"	Akriti Kakkar, Indeep Bakshi	Sharib-Toshi	Hindi	Sony Music India	
2014	Khoobsurat	"Abhi Toh Party Shuru Hui Hai"	Aastha Gill	Badshah	Hindi		
2015	Bajrangi Bhaijaan	"Selfie Le Le Re"	Vishal Dadlani, Nakash Aziz, Pritam	Pritam	Hindi		
2015	ABCD 2	"Vande Mataram"	Daler Mehndi, Tanishka Sanghvi and Divya Kumar	Sachin–Jigar	Hindi	Zee Music Company	
2015	Second Hand Husband	"Bad Baby"	Gippy Grewal		Hindi	Zee Music Company	
2015	All Is Well	"Chaar Shanivaar"	Vishal Dadlani, Armaan Malik	Amaal Mallik	Hindi	T-Series	
2015	Jazbaa	"Aaj Raat Ka Scene"	Shraddha Pandit	Badshah	Hindi	Zee Music Company	
2015	Vedalam	"Aaluma Doluma"	Anirudh Ravichander		Tamil	Sony Music India	
2016	Sanam Re	"Akkad Bakkad"	Neha Kakkar	Badshah	Hindi	T-Series	
2016	Teraa Surroor	"Teri Yaad"	Himesh Reshammiya		Hindi	HR Musik Limited and T-Series	
2016	Kapoor & Sons	"Kar Gayi Chull"	Fazilpuria, Sukriti Kakar, Neha Kakkar	Amaal Mallik, Badshah	Hindi	Sony Music India	
2016	Kapoor & Sons	"Let's Nacho"	Benny Dayal	Nucleya, Benny Dayal	Hindi	Sony Music India	
2016	Sultan	"Baby Ko Bass Pasand Hai"	Vishal Dadlani, Shalmali Kholgade, Ishita, Neeti Mohan	Vishal–Shekhar	Hindi	YRF Music	
2016	Baar Baar Dekho	"Kala Chashma"	Amar Arshi, Neha Kakkar, Indeep Bakshi	Badahah, Prem-Hardeep	Hindi	Zee Music Company	
2016	Ae Dil Hai Mushkil	"The Breakup Song"	Arijit Singh, Jonita Gandhi and Nakash Aziz	Pritam	Hindi	Sony Music India	
2016	Shivaay	"Bolo Har Har Har"	Mithoon, Mohit Chauhan, Sukhwinder Singh Megha Sriram Dalton, Anugrah and The Vamps	Mithoon	Hindi	T-Series	
2017	OK Jaanu	"The Humma Song"	A. R. Rahman, Jubin Nautiyal, Shashaa Tirupati, Tanishk Bagchi	A.R. Rahman, Tanishk Bagchi, Badshah	Hindi	Sony Music India	
2017	Badrinath Ki Dulhania	"Tamma Tamma Again"	Bappi Lahiri, Anuradha Paudwal	Tanishk Bagchi	Hindi	T-Series	
2017	Noor	"Move Your Lakk"	Diljit Dosanjh, Sonakshi Sinha	Badshah	Hindi	T-Series	
2017	Mubarakan	"Mubarakan (Title Track)"	Juggy D, Yash Narvekar, Sukriti Kakar	Rishi Rich, Badshah	Hindi	T-Series	
2017	Bhoomi	"Trippy Trippy"	Neha Kakkar, Benny Dayal, Brijesh Shandilya	Sachin–Jigar	Hindi	T-Series	
2018	Blackmail	"Happy Happy"	Aastha Gill	Badshah	Hindi	T-Series	
2018	Veere Di Wedding	"Tareefan"	Badshah	Qaran	Hindi	Zee Music Company	
2018	Nawabzaade	"Tere Naal Nachna"	Sunanda Sharma	Badshah	Hindi	T-Series	
2018	Stree	"Aao Kabhi Haveli Pe"	Nikhita Gandhi, Sachin–Jigar	Sachin–Jigar	Hindi	T-Series	
2018	Loveyatri	"Aakh Lad Jaave"	Asees Kaur, Jubin Nautiyal	Tanishk Bagchi	Hindi	T-Series	
2018	Namaste England	"Bhare Bazaar"	Vishal Dadlani, Payal Dev, B Praak	Rishi Rich, Badshah	Hindi	Sony Music India	
2018	Namaste England	"Proper Patola"	Diljit Dosanjh, Aastha Gill	Badshah	Hindi	Sony Music India	
2018	Villain	"Bholey Baba"	Nikhita Gandhi	JAM8	Bengali	SVF Entertainment	
2019	Aladdin	"Sab Sahi Hai Bro"		Badshah	Hindi	Disney India	
2019	Khandaani Shafakhana	"Koka"	Jasbir Jassi, Dhvani Bhanushali	Tanishk Bagchi	Hindi	T-Series	
2019	Khandaani Shafakhana	"Sheher Ki Ladki"	Tulsi Kumar	Tanishk Bagchi	Hindi	T-Series	
2019	Khandaani Shafakhana	"Saans To Le Le"	Rico	Badshah	Hindi	T-Series	
2019	Saaho	"Bad Boy"	Neeti Mohan	Badshah	Hindi	T-Series	
2019	Saaho	"Bad Boy"	Neeti Mohan	Badshah	Telugu	T-Series	
2019	Saaho	"Bad Boy"	Benny Dayal, Sunitha Sarathy	Badshah	Tamil	T-Series	
2019	Saaho	"Bad Boy"	Benny Dayal, Sunitha Sarathy	Badshah	Malayalam	T-Series	
2019	Dabangg 3	"Munna Badnaam Hua"	Kamaal Khan, Mamta Sharma	Sajid–Wajid	Hindi	T-Series	
2019	Good Newwz	"Chandigarh Mein"	Harrdy Sandhu, Asees Kaur, Lisa Mishra	Tanishk Bagchi	Hindi	Zee Music Company	
2020	Street Dancer 3D	"Garmi"	Neha Kakkar	Badshah	Hindi	T-Series	
2020	Indoo Ki Jawani	"Heelein Toot Gayi"	Aastha Gill	Badshah	Hindi	T-Series	
2021	Red Notice	"Bach Ke Rehna"	Jonita Gandhi, DIVINE, Mikey McCleary	R. D Burman, Divine, Mikey McCleary, Badshah	Hindi	Netflix India	
2022	Cirkus	"Aashiqui"	Amrita Singh	Badshah, Hiten Kumar	Hindi	T-Series	
2022	Dhaakad	"She's On Fire"	Nikhita Gandhi	Badshah	Hindi	Zee Music Company	
2023	Bloody Daddy	"Issa Vibe"	Payal Dev	Badshah, Aditya Dev	Hindi	Times Music	
2023	Jawan	"Faratta"	Arijit Singh, Jonita Gandhi	Anirudh Ravichander	Hindi	T-Series	
2023	Sukhee	"Nasha"	Badshah, Chakshu Kotwal, Afsana Khan	Badshah, Hiten	Hindi	T-Series	
2023	Sukhee	"Nasha (Badshah Version)"	Badshah, Chakshu Kotwal, Afsana Khan	Badshah, Hiten	Hindi	T-Series	
2023	Farrey	Ghar Pe Party Hai"	Badshah, Aastha Gill, Mellow D	Sachin–Jigar	Hindi	Zee Music Company	
2024	Crew	"Naina"	Badshah, Diljit Dosanjh	Raj Ranjodh	Hindi	Tips Music	
2024	Crew	"Khwabida"	Badshah	Bharg-Rohit	Hindi	Tips Music	
2024	Ishq Vishk Rebound	"Gore Gore Mukhde Pe"	Udit Narayan, Badshah, Nikhita Gandhi	Badshah, Hiten	Hindi	Tips Music	
2025	Mere Husband Ki Biwi	"Gori Hai Kalaiyan"	Badshah, Kanika Kapoor, Sharvi Yadav, IP Singh	Akshay & IP, Badshah	Hindi	Just Music Label	
2025	Baaghi 4	"Bahli Sohni"	Mani Moudgill, Badshah, Nikhita Gandhi	Mani Moudgill, Badshah	Hindi	T-Series	
2026	Pati Patni Aur Woh Do	"Humne Wahi Lagaya Dil"	Ipsitaa, Badshah, Krish Mondal, Kishore Mondal	Badshah, Hiten	Hindi	T-Series	

== Film career ==
=== As producer ===
Year	Film	Language	Director	Notes
2019	Do Dooni Panj	Punjabi	Harry Bhatti	Composed songs also

=== Film ===
Year	Film	Role	Language	Director	Notes
2019	Khandaani Shafakhana	Gabru Ghatak	Hindi	Shilpi Dasgupta	Composed songs also

=== Television ===
Year	Show	Role	Broadcaster
2022–2023	India's Got Talent	Judge	Sony
2022–2023	MTV Hustle	Judge	MTV
2024–present	Indian Idol	Judge	Sony Entertainment Television
2024	The Great Indian Kapil Show	Guest	Netflix
2024-2026	India's Got Latent	Guest judge	YouTube
2025	The Ba***ds of Bollywood	Cameo	Netflix
2026	MTV Hustle	Judge	MTV, Jio Hotstar

== Awards and nominations ==
Award ceremony	Category	Nominated work	Result	Ref
25th IIFA Awards	Best Playback Singer - Male	"Naina" from Crew	Nominated	
Filmfare Awards	Best Playback Singer- Male	"Tareefan" from Veere Di Wedding	Nominated	
PTC Punjabi Film Awards	Best Punjabi Music of The Year	Wakhra Swag by Navv Inder ft. Badshah	Won	
10th Mirchi Music Awards	Best Song Engineer (Recording & Mixing)	"Mercy" from O.N.E	Nominated	
Brit Asia TV Music Awards 2017	Best Bollywood Act	—N/a	Won	
