= PTC Award for Best Actor =

Indian film award

PTC Punjabi Film Awards for Best Actor
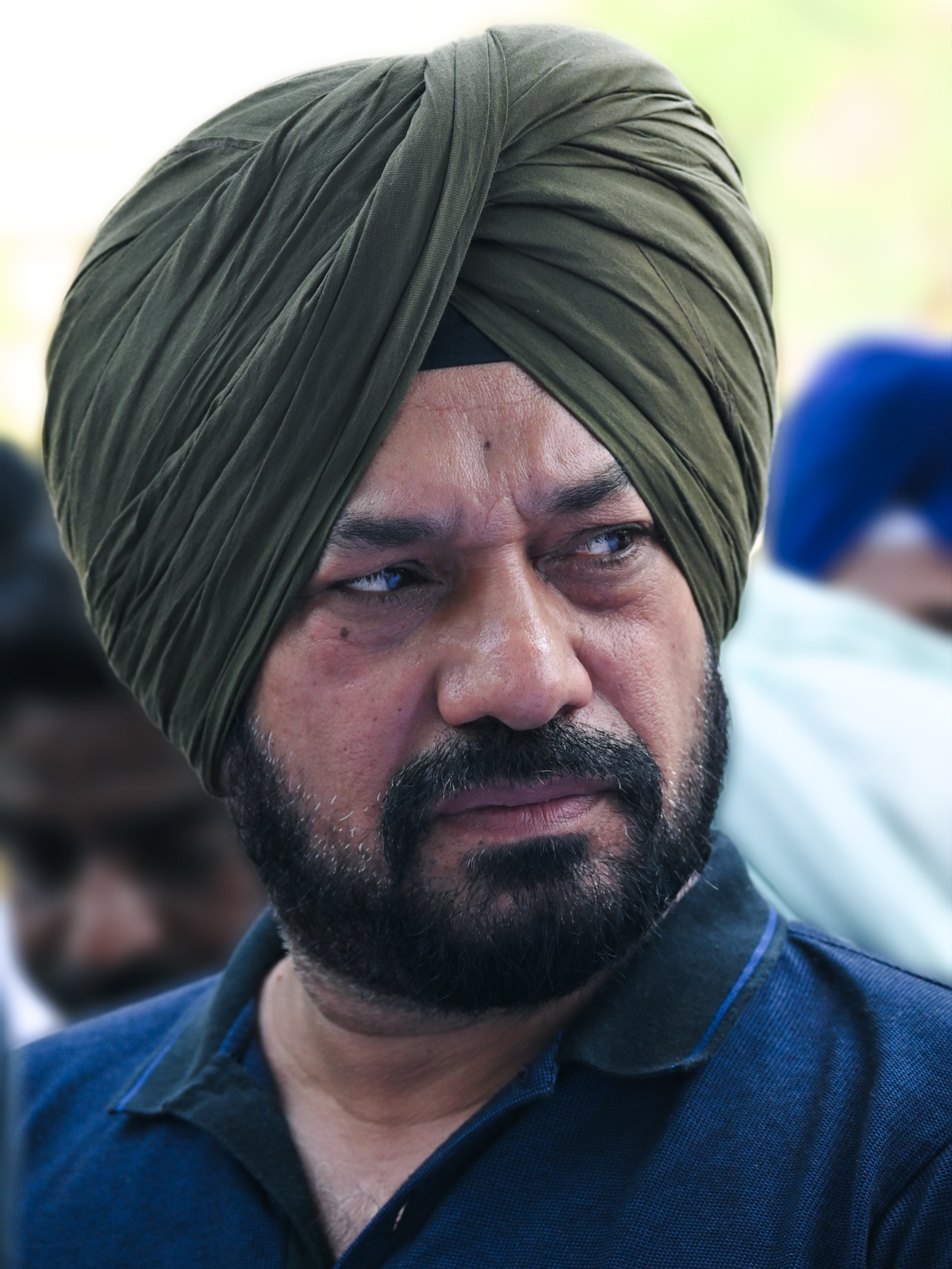
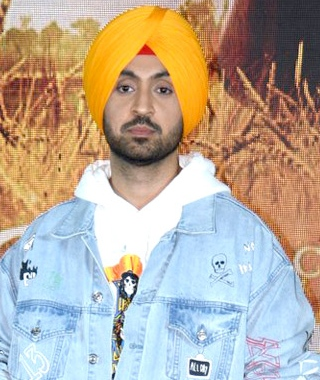
- The 2020 recipient: Gurpreet Ghuggi & Diljit Dosanjh
- Awarded for: Best Performance by an Actor in a Leading Role
- Country: India
- Presented by: PTC Punjabi
- First award: Jimmy Shergill, Mel Karade Rabba (2011)
- Currently held by: Gurpreet Ghuggi, Ardaas Karaan; Diljit Dosanjh, Shadaa(2020)
- Website: PTC Awards

The PTC Punjabi Film Awards award for Best Actor is an award, begun in 2011, presented annually at the PTC Awards to an actor via a jury. This is given by PTC Punjabi as part of its annual PTC Awards for Punjabi (Pollywood) films. As of 2020, Diljit Dosanjh leads the list of winners, with five wins, followed by Amrinder Gill and Gippy Grewal (three wins each).

== Winners and nominees ==
Table key
| ‡ | Indicates the winner |

=== 2010s ===
| Year | Photos of winners | Actor | Role(s) | Film |
|---|---|---|---|---|
| 2011 (1st) | | Jimmy Shergill | Rajveer Gill | Mel Karade Rabba |
| 2011 (1st) | | Amrinder Gill | Sehajpal Singh | Ik Kudi Punjab Di |
| 2011 (1st) | | Gurdas Mann | Major Kuldeep Singh | Sukhmani: Hope for Life |
| 2011 (1st) | | Gurpreet Ghuggi | Baljit Singh | Lad Gaya Pecha |
| 2011 (1st) | | Manpreet Singh | Fateh Singh | Chhevan Dariya |
| 2012 (2nd) | | Diljit Dosanjh | Gurnoor Randhawa | Jihne Mera Dil Luteya |
| 2012 (2nd) | | Gippy Grewal | Yuvraj | Jihne Mera Dil Luteya |
| 2012 (2nd) | | Arya Babbar | Guru | Yaar Annmulle |
| 2012 (2nd) | | Diljit Dosanjh | Avtar | The Lion of Punjab |
| 2012 (2nd) | | Harbhajan Maan | Sukhdeep | Yaara o Dildaara |
| 2012 (2nd) | | Jimmy Shergill | Jasdeep Singh | Dharti |
| 2012 (2nd) | | Harish Verma | Sher Singh | Yaar Annmulle |
| 2013 (3rd) | | Diljit Dosanjh | Fateh Singh | Jatt & Juliet |
| 2013 (3rd) | | Amrinder Gill | Himmat Singh | Taur Mittran Di |
| 2013 (3rd) | | Gavie Chahal | Raj | Pinky Moge Wali |
| 2013 (3rd) | | Gippy Grewal | Jass | Carry on Jatta |
| 2013 (3rd) | | Gippy Grewal | Mirza | Mirza – The Untold Story |
| 2013 (3rd) | | Harish Verma | Valley | Burraahh |
| 2013 (3rd) | | Tarun Khanna | Harman Singh | Pata Nahi Rabb Kehdeyan Rangan Ch Raazi |
| 2014 (4th) | | Diljit Dosanjh | Fateh Singh | Jatt & Juliet 2 |
| 2014 (4th) | | Arya Babbar | Rocky | Naughty Jatts |
| 2014 (4th) | | Gippy Grewal | Nihal Singh | Singh vs Kaur |
| 2014 (4th) | | Jimmy Shergill | Sunny | Rangeelay |
| 2014 (4th) | | Harbhajan Mann | Ranjit | Haani |
| 2014 (4th) | | Harish Verma | Amar Deep | RSVP |
| 2014 (4th) | | Roshan Prince | Jassi | Fer Mamla Gadbad Gadbad |
| 2014 (4th) | | Amrinder Gill | Manni | Daddy Cool Munde Fool |
| 2015 (5th) | | Diljit Dosanjh | Shivjeet Singh | Punjab 1984 |
| 2015 (5th) | | Gippy Grewal | Shinda | Jatt James Bond |
| 2015 (5th) | | Amrinder Gill | Kala | Goreyan Nu Daffa Karo |
| 2015 (5th) | | Diljit Dosanjh | Lattu Singh | Disco Singh |
| 2015 (5th) | | Harish Verma | Raj | Proper Patola |
| 2015 (5th) | | Jimmy Shergill | Roopinder Singh | Aa Gaye Munde U.K. De |
| 2015 (5th) | | Nav Bajwa | Fateh | Fateh |
| 2015 (5th) | | Roshan Prince | Guru | Ishq Brandy |
| 2016 (6th) | | Amrinder Gill | Angrej 'Geja' | Angrej |
| 2016 (6th) | | Diljit Dosanjh | Jaggi | Sardaar Ji |
| 2016 (6th) | | Gippy Grewal | Ekam | Faraar |
| 2016 (6th) | | Jassi Gill | Parwaan | Dildariyaan |
| 2016 (6th) | | Jimmy Sheirgill | Jassa | Shareek |
| 2016 (6th) | | Ravinder Grewal | Judge Singh | Judge Singh LLB |
| 2017 (7th) | | Amrinder Gill | Pargat Brar | Love Punjab |
| 2017 (7th) | | Ammy Virk | Channan Singh | Bambukat |
| 2017 (7th) | | Binnu Dhillon | Taaji | Channo Kamli Yaar Di |
| 2017 (7th) | | Diljit Dosanjh | Ambarsariya "Raw Agent" | Ambarsariya |
| 2017 (7th) | | Gippy Grewal | Kaptaan | Kaptaan |
| 2017 (7th) | | Gurpreet Ghuggi | Gurmukh Singh | Ardaas |
| 2017 (7th) | | Roshan Prince | Amarjit | Main Teri Tu Mera |
| 2017 (7th) | | Harish Verma | Ajit Singh | Vaapsi |
| 2018 (8th) | | Amrinder Gill | Kikkar Singh | Lahoriye |
| 2018 (8th) | | Ammy Virk | Nikka Zaildar | Nikka Zaildar 2 |
| 2018 (8th) | | Binnu Dhillon | Jagga | Bailaras |
| 2018 (8th) | | Deep Sidhu | Jora | Jora 10 Numbaria |
| 2018 (8th) | | Diljit Dosanjh | Sajjan/Super Singh | Super Singh |
| 2018 (8th) | | Jassi Gill | Babbu | Sargi |
| 2018 (8th) | | Jimmy Shergill | Karamjeet Singh | Jindua |
| 2018 (8th) | | Tarsem Jassar | Manjinder Singh | Rabb Da Radio |
| 2019 (9th) | | Gippy Grewal | Jass | Carry On Jatta 2 |
| 2019 (9th) | | Ammy Virk | Harjeet Singh | Harjeeta |
| 2019 (9th) | | Amrinder Gill | Pamma Dhillon | Ashke |
| 2019 (9th) | | Binnu Dhillon | Pargat | Vadhayiyaan Ji Vadhayiyaan |
| 2019 (9th) | | Dev Kharoud | Mintu | Dakuaan Da Munda |
| 2019 (9th) | | Diljit Dosanjh | Sajjan Singh | Sajjan Singh Rangroot |
| 2019 (9th) | | Harish Verma | Neeta | Golak Bugni Bank Te Batua |
| 2019 (9th) | | Jimmy Shergill | Mehtaab Singh | Daana Paani |
| 2019 (9th) | | Tarsem Jassar | Jaspal Singh | Afsar |

=== 2020s ===
| Year | Photos of winners | Actor | Role(s) | Film |
|---|---|---|---|---|
| 2020 (10th) | | Diljit Dosanjh | Chadta | Shadaa |
| 2020 (10th) | | Gurpreet Ghuggi | Magic Singh | Ardaas Karaan |
| 2020 (10th) | | Ammy Virk | Shinda | Muklawa |
| 2020 (10th) | | Amrinder Gill | Garry Randhawa | Laiye Je Yaarian |
| 2020 (10th) | | Binnu Dhillon | Ballu | Jhalle |
| 2020 (10th) | | Dev Kharoud | Gama | Blackia |
| 2020 (10th) | | Gippy Grewal | Rajveer | Chandigarh Amritsar Chandigarh |
| 2020 (10th) | | Parmish Verma | Laddi | Dil Diyan Gallan |
| 2020 (10th) | | Tarsem Jassar | Manjinder Singh | Rabb Da Radio 2 |
