= Dheeraj Rattan =

Indian film writer

- Born: 28 October 1974 (age 51)
- Occupations: Writer, Director
- Years active: 2004–present

Dheeraj Rattan is a screenplay and story writer known for films like Mumbai Salsa and Haal-e-dil.

He has worked with Vikram Bhatt on three successive horror films - 1920, Shaapit and Phirr. He made his screenplay and dialogue writing debut in the Punjabi film industry with Mel Karade Rabba with the cast Jimmy Shergill, Gippy Grewal and Neeru Bajwa, which went on to become the biggest Punjabi hit of that time. It collected Rs. 1.95 Crores in Punjab alone in the opening week.

Since then he has written several Punjabi films like Jatt & Juliet 1 and 2, Best of Luck and Romeo Ranjha.

His films Shareek, Ambarsariya, Sardaar Ji 2, Kaptaan, and Jindua saw wide commercial success.

== Career ==
After a stint as an assistant director in Bollywood in 2007, Rattan established his career as a screenplay and story writer with the films Mumbai Salsa and Haal-e-Dil. Between 2008 and 2011, he worked with Vikram Bhatt on three successive movies in the horror, mystery and thriller genres, namely 1920, Shaapit and Phhir. He simultaneously made his screenplay and dialogue writing debut in the Punjabi film industry with the movie Mel Karade Rabba, starring Jimmy Shergill, Gippy Grewal and Neeru Bajwa, which went on to become the biggest Punjabi hit of that time, with the highest opening day, weekend and week collections for any Punjabi film at the time of its release. It collected Rs 1.95 cr in Punjab alone in its opening week.

Since then, Rattan has written several critically acclaimed and commercially successful blockbusters in Punjabi cinema, including Jatt & Juliet 1 & 2, Best of Luck and Romeo Ranjha. In addition to writing their scripts, with the films Saadi Love Story and Ishq Garaari, he also made his directorial debut, which was widely received with appreciation and positive responses from critics and masses alike. His film Shareek, released in October 2015, is a hit family drama directed by Navaniat Singh, starring Jimmy Shergill, Mahie Gill and Guggu Gill, produced under the banner of Ohri Productions and Green Planet Productions. His last release Ambarsariya, starring Diljit Dosanjh and Lauren Gottlieb was a blockbuster hit in India and abroad.

His 2016 releases Sardaar Ji 2 starring Diljit Dosanjh and Sonam Bajwa, and Kaptaan starring Gippy Grewal and Monica Gill, were eagerly awaited.

In 2024, Dheeraj Rattan worked as Screenplay and story writer for the film Khadari.

== Filmography ==
Film	Year	Credits
Khadari	2024	Co-Screenplay and Story
Jatt Brothers	2022	Story and Screenplay
Shiddat	2021	Co-Screenplay and Co-Dialogues
Ardab Mutiyaran	2019	Story and Screenplay
Tara Mira	2019	Screenplay
Singham	2019	Screenplay and Dialogues
Sikander 2	2019	Story and Screenplay
Bhangra Paa Le	2019	Story, Screenplay and Dialogues
Khamoshi	2019	Screenplay
Laiye Je Yaarian	2019	Story, Co-Screenplay and Co-Dialogues
Banjara: The Truck Driver	2018	Story and Screenplay
Laatu	2018	Screenplay
Son of Manjeet Singh	2018	Screenplay
Yamla Pagla Deewana Phir Se	2018	Story and Screenplay
Ashke	2018	Story, Screenplay, Co-Dialogues
Golak Bugni Bank Te Batua	2018	Story and Screenplay
Welcome To New York	2018	Screenplay and Co-Dialogues
Toofan Singh	2017	Screenplay
Super Singh	2017	Co-Screenplay
Jindua	2017	Story and Screenplay
Kaptaan	2016	Story and Screenplay
Sardaar Ji 2	2016	Story and Screenplay
Ambarsariya	2016	Story and Screenplay
Shareek	2015	Writer
Sardaar Ji	2015	Writer
Ishqedarriyaan	2015	Writer
Baaz	2014	Writer
Romeo Ranjha	2014	Writer
Dil Vil Pyaar Vyaar	2014	Writer
Ishq Garaari	2013	Writer & director
Best of Luck	2013	Writer
Jatt & Juliet 2	2013	Writer
Singh vs Kaur	2013	Writer
Tu Mera 22 Main Tera 22	2013	Writer
Saadi Love Story	2013	Writer & director
Rangeelay	2013	Writer
Jatt & Juliet	2012	Writer
Taur Mittran Di	2012	Writer
Phhir	2011	Screenplay writer & Asst Director
Jihne Mera Dil Luteya	2011	Writer
Mel Karade Rabba	2010	Screenplay & Dialogue writer
Shaapit	2010	Screenplay writer
Aagey Se Right	2009	Additional Screenplay
1920	2008	Screenplay writer
Haal-e-Dil	2008	Screenplay & Story writer
Mumbai Salsa	2007	Additional screenplay
Police Force: An Inside Story	2004	Asst Director
