= Shipra Goyal =

Indian singer (born 1991)

- Born: 25 September 1991 (age 34); Delhi, India
- Genres: Pop, dance
- Occupations: Singer, lyricist, composer
- Years active: 2009–present
- Label: Blue Beat Studios
- Website: Shipra Goyal on Instagram

Shipra Goyal is an Indian singer, popular for her songs like "Ishq Bulava", "Angreji Wali Madam", "Ungli", "Tutti Bole Wedding Di", "Yadaan Teriyaan", "Lovely VS PU", "Mainu Ishq Lagaa" and "Paro".

== Early life ==
Shipra Goyal was born and brought up in Delhi. Her parents, Subhash and Anju Goyal, are both singers.

== Career ==
After graduating in classical music from Hindu College, she moved to Mumbai in 2013, and soon made her debut with Vishal–Shekhar's 'Ishq Bulaava'. Since then she has sung many songs in Bollywood and Pollywood.

== Discography ==
=== Singles ===
Year	Track	Lyrics	Music	Label
2017	Akh Jatti Di	Veet Baljit	Nick Dhamnu	White Hill Music
2017	OMG (Oh My God)	Mike Randhawa	Rajat Nagpal	Zee Music Company
2017	Choti Choti Gal	Akhil (singer)	Rajat Nagpal	T-Series (company)
2018	Viah Wala Joda	Mike Randhawa	Rajat Nagpal	T-Series (company)
2018	4 By 4	Alfaaz	Ikwinder Singh	T-Series (company)
2019	DJ Te	Veet Baljit	Vee	T-Series (company)
2019	Main Teri Rani	Nirmaan	Abhijit Vaghani	T-Series (company)
2020	Ik Din	Babbu Maan	Babbu Maan	Swag Music
2020	Patola	Veet Baljit	Intense	Humble Music
2020	Haye Tauba (ft.Parmish Verma)	Nirmaan	Enzo	Gringo Entertainment
2020	BBC	Raana	Vee	T-Series (company)
2020	Saah Chalde	Nikk	MixSingh	T-Series (company)
2020	Jhanjran	Garry Sandhu	Ikwinder Singh	Fresh Media Records
2020	I Don't Care	Khan Bhaini	Sycostyle	Blue Beat Studios
2021	Koke (ft.Arjan Dhillon)	Arjan Dhillon	Dr Zeus	Blue Beat Studios
2021	Tohmat (ft. Gauahar Khan)	Nirmaan	Enzo	Speed Records
2021	Suit Purane (ft. Inder Chahal)	Babbu	MixSingh	White Hill Music
2021	Hold	Shipra Goyal	Mrxci	Blue Beat Studios
2021	Pind	Romey Maan	Sulfa	Blue Beat Studios
2022	Chamba	Kunaal Vermaa	B Show	Blue Beat Studios
2022	Ride	Shipra Goyal	Mrxci	Blue Beat Studios
2022	Subah Se Shaam	Kunaal Vermaa	Abhijit Vaghani	Meri Tune
2022	Jee Lain De	Shipra Goyal		Blue Beat Studios

=== Duo collaboration ===
Year	Title	Co Singer/s	Music	Lyrics	Record label
2014	Lovely Vs PU	Ravinder Grewal	Dj Flow	Preet Sanghreri	Tedi Pag Records
2016	Filmy Jatt	Vicky Vik	Beat Minister	Kumaar Sunny	9X Tashan
2017	3 Saal	Sukhpal Channi	Qaistrax	Veet Baljit	White Hill Music
2017	Angreji Wali Madam	Kulwinder Billa	Dr Zeus	Shivjot	Speed Records
2018	Naraan	Sajjan Adeeb	Music Empire	Aman Bilaspuri	VS Records
2018	Piche Piche	Alfaaz	Intense	Alfaaz	Eros Now
2019	Jigriaa Yaara	Jimmy Kaler	Rox-A	Jimmy Kaler	Geet MP3
2019	Bulgari	Kulwinder Billa	Dr Zeus	Alfaaz	Speed Records
2019	Kharche	Gurnam Bhullar	Music Empire	Dalveer	Jass Records
2019	Gaddi Pichhe Naa	Khan Bhaini	Sycostyle	Khan Bhaini	Single Track Studios
2020	Nakhro	Khan Bhaini	Sycostyle	Khan Bhaini	Single Track Studios
2020	Tere Ala Jatt	Gippy Grewal	Jay K	Vickhy Sandhu	GEET MP3
2021	Lambhorghini	Khan Bhaini	Sycostyle	Khan Bhaini	Single Track Studios
2021	Churi	Khan Bhaini	Sycostyle	Khan Bhaini	Street Gang Music
2021	Jatt Nikle	Ninja (singer)	Sehmby K	Pardeep Malak	White Hill Music
2021	Sohneya Ve	Ninja (singer)	Yeah Proof	Laddi Chahal	Nischay Records
2021	Romantic Raaja	Khesari Lal Yadav	Abhijit Vaghani	Kunaal Vermaa	Blue Beat Studios
2021	Sira	Dilpreet Dhillon	Desi Crew	Kaptaan	Speed Records
2021	Ishq	Garry Sandhu	Ikky	Garry Sandhu	Fresh Media Records
2021	1 Hour	Korala Maan	Sycostyle	Korala Maan	Team7 Picture
2021	Paune 12	Karan Randhawa	Raka	Jind Dhaliwal	GEET MP3
2021	DD1	Veet Baljit	Sycostyle	Veet Baljit	State Studios
2021	Ilaaj	Gippy Grewal	StarBoy Music X	Mani Longia	Humble Music
2021	U Turn	R Nait	Laddi Gill	R Nait	White Hill Music
2022	Ladaaka	R Nait	Dr Zeus	R Nait	Blue Beat Studios
2022	Big Men (Chapter 2)	R Nait	Laddi Gill	R Nait	R Nait Music
2022	Chak Chak Chak	Khan Bhaini	Sycostyle	Khan Bhaini	Bang Music
2022	Gaddi Kaali	Jassie Gill	Preet Romana	Kaptaan	Jassie Gill Music
2022	Itna Pyaar Karuga	Babbu Maan	Shipra Goyal	Kunaal Vermaa	Blue Beat Studios
2022	Tainu Bhulna	Simar Doraha	Goldboy	Simar Doraha	Tuneslay Entertainment

=== Soundtrack album ===
Year	Movie	Title	Lyrics	Music	Co-singer	Length
Bollywood
2014	Hasee Toh Phasee	"Ishq Bulava"	Kumaar	Vishal–Shekhar	Sanam Puri	4:04
2014	Crazy Cukkad Family	Crazy Kukkad	Kumaar	Sidhartha Suhaas	Shahid Mallya	3:26
2014	Crazy Cukkad Family	Yeh Dil Jaane Na	Kumaar	Sidhartha Suhaas	Ankit Dayal	4:11
2015	Welcome Back	"Tutti Bole Wedding Di"	Kumaar	Meet Bros		4:23
2015	Pyaar Ka Punchnama 2	"Paro"	Kumaar	Hitesh Sonik	Dev Negi	4:27
2015	Hero	"Yaadan Teriyaan"	Kumaar	Arjuna Harjai	Dev Negi	2:52
2015	Love Exchange	"Tujhse Door"	Kumaar	Jaidev Kumar	Dev Negi	4:22
2016	Ungli	"Ungli Pe Nachalein"	Kumaar	Aslam Keyi	Dev Negi	3:05
2016	MMIRSA	"O Mere Khuda (Duet)"	Kumaar	Jaidev Kumar	Amit Gupta	5:00
2016	One Night Stand	"Ki Kara"	Kumaar	Vivek Kar	Solo	5:30
2021	Helmet	"Barbaad"	Nirmaan	Goldboy	Goldboy	4:26
Punjabi
2009	Mitti	"Boliyan"	Rana	Mika Singh		4:57
2012	Taur Mittran Di	"Darshan Di Bukh"	Jaggi Singh	Jaidev Kumar	Amrinder Gill	4:36
2013	Rangeelay	"Yaara Tu"	Kumaar	Jaidev Kumar	Ashim Kemson	5:02
2013	Haani	"Teri Meri Jodi"	Babu Singh Maan	Jaidev Kumar	Dev Negi	4:01
2014	Baaz	"Kuddi Mardi"	Babbu Maan	Babbu Maan	Babbu Maan	3:48
2014	Baaz	"Makaan"	Babbu Maan	Babbu Maan	Babbu Maan	6:51
2014	Mr & Mrs 420	"Haathhan Vich"	Kumaar	Jaidev Kumar	Solo	3:53
2014	Happy Go Lucky	"33 Number"	Kumaar	Jassi Katyal	Jassi Katyal	3:30
2014	Happy Go Lucky	"Coffee Shop – Female"	Kumaar	Jassi Katyal	Solo	4:05
2014	Mundeyan Ton Bachke Rahin	"Ranno"	Kumaar	Jassi Katyal	Jassi Katyal	3:49
2014	Chaar Sahibzaade	"Vela Aa Gaya"		Jaidev Kumar	Jaspinder Narula	4:26
2014	Chaar Sahibzaade	"Sat Guru Nanak Pargatya"		Jaidev Kumar	Asa Singh Mastana	4:02
2014	Dili 1984	"Dil De Cubare"	Preet Mohinder Tiwari	Gurdeep Mehndi	Jasbir Jassi	3:37
2014	Dili 1984	"Love Ho Gaya"	Preet Mohinder Tiwari	Gurdeep Mehndi	Gurdeep Mehndi	3:53
2015	Judge Singh LLB	"Pari"	Joban Cheema	Dj Flow	Ravinder Grewal	3:35
2015	Gadaar	"Yadaan"	Babu Singh Maan	Jaidev Kumar	Harbhajan Mann	4:36
2015	Shareek	"Mainu Ishq Lagaa"	Devinder Khannewala	Jaidev Kumar	Shaukat Ali Matoi	4:44
2016	25 Kille	"Rabb Di Mehar"	Devinder Khannewala	Jaidev Kumar	Saanjh	3:46
2016	Goreyan Nu Daffa Karo	"Goreyan Nu Daffa Karo"	Kumaar	Jatinder Shah	Amrinder Gill	3:12
2017	Mahi NRI	"Tere Bina"	Kumaar	Arjunaa Harjai	Master Saleem	3:53
2017	Dushman	"Mehrama"	Devinder Khannewala	Jaidev Kumar	Solo	4:37
2017	Toofan Singh	"Tere Mere Khwabaan Da Desh"	Gurcharan Virk	Charanjit Singh	Ranjit Bawa	5:58
2017	Jindua	"Dholna"	Dr. Devendra Kafir	Jaidev Kumar	Prabh Gill	2:23
2017	Rupinder Gandhi 2: The Robinhood	"Buklan"	Veet Baljit	Qaistrax	Solo	3:41
2018	Daana Paani	"Rabb Khair Kare"	Veet Baljit	Jaidev Kumar	Prabh Gill	3:04
2018	Dakuan Da Munda	"Pyaar"	Veet Baljit	Qaistrax	Veet Baljit	2:51
2018	Carry On Jatta 2	"Gabru"	Happy Raikoti	Jassi Katyal	Gippy Grewal	3:06
2019	Shadaa	"Mehndi"	Happy Raikoti	Nick Dhamnu	Diljit Dosanjh	2:46
2019	Saak	"Gabru Di Gall"	Veet Baljit	Qaistrax	Veet Baljit	3:19
2019	Ishq My Religion	"Bhabhi"	Preet Tapri	Jaidev Kumar	Abrar-ul-Haq	4:38
2019	Singham	"Demand"	Raj Ranjodh	Desi Crew	Goldy Desi Crew	2:25
2019	Tu Mera Ki Lagda	"Jaroorat Sahan Di"	Bachan Bedil	Atul Sharma	Harjit Harman	3:15
2019	Munda Faridkotia	"Sun Layi"	Jogi Raikoti	Jaggi Singh	Roshan Prince	4:02
2020	Ik Sandhu Hunda Si	"Charche"	Happy Raikoti	DJ Flow	Gippy Grewal	3:01
2021	Chal Mera Putt 2	"Russeya Karun"	Khushi Pandher	Dr Zeus	Gurshabad	2:48
2022	Dakuan Da Munda 2	"Shy – Sang Lagdi Aa"	Veet Baljit	Nick Dhamnu	Veet Baljit	2:58
Tamil
2015	Puli	"Puli"	Vairamuthu	Devi Sri Prasad	Vijay Prakash	4:37
Kannada
2015	Care of Footpath 2	"Bullet Nanna"	Raghu Niduvali	Kishan Shrikanth	Girik Aman	4:28

== Filmography ==
Year	Film	Role
2019	Laiye Je Yaarian	Herself (special appearance)

== Awards and nominations ==
- Nominated in the category of Best Duet Vocalist for "Lovely Vs PU" alongside singer Ravinder Grewal (PTC Punjab Music Awards 2015.
- Nominated in the category of Best Female Singer for "Hatthan VIch Luk Luk Ke" (Mirchi Music Awards Punjabi 2014).
