= Singham (2019 film) =

2019 Indian Punjabi film

- Theatrical release poster
- Directed by: Navaniat Singh
- Screenplay by: Dheeraj Rattan
- Story by: Hari
- Based on: Singam by Hari
- Produced by: Bhushan Kumar; Krishan Kumar; Kumar Mangat Pathak; Abhishek Pathak
- Starring: Parmish Verma; Kartar Cheema; Sonam Bajwa
- Cinematography: Harmeet Singh
- Edited by: Bunty Nagi
- Music by: Songs: Desi Crew; Score: Amar Mohile
- Production companies: T-Series; Ajay Devgn FFilms; Panorama Studios
- Distributed by: Panorama Studios International; Omjee Star Studios
- Release date: 9 August 2019 (India)
- Running time: 140 minutes
- Country: India
- Language: Punjabi

Singham is a 2019 Indian Punjabi-language action film written by Dheeraj Rattan and directed by Navaniat Singh. Co-produced by T-Series, Ajay Devgn FFilms and Panorama Studios, it stars Parmish Verma, Kartar Cheema and Sonam Bajwa, along with Sardar Sohi, Rupinder Rupi, Anita Devgn, and Hardeep Gill in supporting roles. It is an official remake of 2010 Tamil film Singam. The film chronicles the story of righteous cop Dilsher Singh, who fights against drug peddlers in his village Singham Khurd.

The film was released worldwide on 9 August 2019.

== Plot ==
After taking charge as the DSP of Singham Khurd, Dilsher Sekhon sets out to end the drug addiction among the youth of Punjab. This sets him against Bhuller, a vicious business tycoon with connections in high places.

== Cast ==
- Parmish Verma as DSP Dilsher Sekhon
- Kartar Cheema as Bhullar
- Sonam Bajwa as Nikki
- Sardar Sohi as MLA Sartaaj
- Tarsem Kumar as Dilsher's father
- Rupinder Rupi as Dilsher's mother
- Rakesh Bedi as Nikki's father
- Amandeep Paltanya as Nikki's mother
- Deep Joshi as SHO Sehgal
- Hardeep Gill as Tejinder, a police officer
- Anita Devgan as Neelam Madam, a lady police Officer
- Prakash Gadhu as Sewa Singh
- Surinder Vicky as SP Kuldeep Parhar
- Rajwinder Samrala as DSP Malkeet
- Charanpreet Kaur as Meetu
- Samual Jhon as Bishna
- Priyanka Arya as Pinki
- Navdeep Kaler as Jaggi
- Arjan Singh as Fauji Taya
- Gurpreet Bhangu as Bitti Taayi
- Renu Mohali as Balbiro Maasi
- Randeep Bhangu as Jagga
- Baljit Jakhmi as Gurjant
- Manpreet Singh Bhatti as Chandu
- Bashir Khan as Birju
- Jarnail Singh as Sarpanch
- Gautam Thakur as Reporter
- Jaspal Singh as Lalli

== Soundtrack ==
The music was composed by Desi Crew while the lyrics were penned by Raj Ranjodh, Laddi Chahal, and Balvir Boparai. The album features vocals from Shipra Goyal, Kulwinder Dhillon, and Goldy Desi Crew. The song "Kalli Kitte Mil", sung by Dhillon, with music originally given by Sukhpal Sukh and lyrics penned by Balvir Boparai, was recreated by Desi Crew.

Track listing
No.	Title	Lyrics	Music	Singer(s)	Length
1.	"Demand"	Raj Ranjodh	Desi Crew	Goldy Desi Crew; Shipra Goyal	2:24
2.	"Tolla Nachda"	Laddi Chahal	Desi Crew	Goldy Desi Crew	3:02
3.	"Kalli Kitte Mil"	Balvir Boparai	Sukhpal Sukh (Recreated by Desi Crew)	Kulwinder Dhillon	3:35
Total length:					9:01

== Release ==
The film was released theatrically on 9 August 2019.
