= Deep (rapper) =

American rapper

Deep Cold
- Also known as: Deep Cold, Deep Da 1
- Born: Amardeep Singh Basra
- Origin: Houston, Texas, United States
- Died: 5 March 2014
- Genres: Southern rap, Desi hip-hop, Urban Desi
- Occupation: Rapper
- Years active: 2002–2014
- Label: Da 1 Records
- Website: www.dA1records.com

Deep, also known as Deep Cold or Deep Da 1, was an American Southern rap artist of Indian Punjabi origin from Houston, Texas. Raised in the city, Deep attended the same high school as Paul Wall and Chamillionaire. His first interest in music came at a young age when a tight family household income made him seek other avenues of making money.

== Biography ==
After a rough year in 2000, Deep Cold was forced to re-evaluate his position and decided to co-create Da 1 Records with his cousin. Deep Cold released his debut album In Trunks Now in 2005 on his independent label. It featured big Southern Rap names such as Slim Thug, David Banner, Big Moe, Big Pokey as well as Too $hort. Since then he has personally signed new artists Lenny Lenn and Kamla Punjabi to the label and has played a major role in the financing of their album. His comment about his style of music. "I don't have a specific style of music that can be categorized. I make music that transcends hate, barriers and race. That's what music is intended to (do)." He co-hosted a MTV Desi Show with Kamala Punjabi.

Deep released 'Dekhlo Punjabi Munde' in 2007. The song quickly moved up the BBC charts and spread worldwide. In 2009, Deep and Kamla Punjabi released a collaboration album 'Nach Nach' which was produced by DJ Sanj/J-Nas. In 2010 'Dekhlo Punjabi Munde' was remixed by replacing Deep Cold and Kamla Punjabi's verses with the vocals of Diljit Dosanjh and featured in the Punjabi movie Mel Karade Rabba, albeit retaining the chorus of the original.

Deep Cold has worked with David Banner, Too $hort, Slim Thug, Big Moe, Lil KeKe, Billy Cook, C-Note (Botany Boyz), S.U.C. - Screwed Up Click, Master Saleem, Sonu Nigam, The Teflon Don, Sonny Brown, DJ Sanj/J-Nas, Diljit Singh, Jas Rai, Kamla Punjabi, Haji Springer and more.

== Death ==
Deep died on March 5, 2014, during a visit to India, where he was working on an upcoming album.

== Discography ==
=== Albums ===
- 2002: In Trunks Now
- 2009: Nach Nach With Kamla Punjabi
- 2011: The Drip

=== Featured on ===
- 2004 Burning Hot - Feat Mr Riz (Produced by Harry Sona)
- 2005 Sona Family - Glassy 2 (featuring Hard Kaur & Deep Cold) - (Produced by Harry Sona)
- 2005: Suga Kane Records - West Coast Desi
- 2006: Suga Kane Records - First Blood
- 2006: Kal M, DJ Sanj & Lil Sach - America's Most Wanted 4
- 2007: Mr. Underground - Underground Road Trip (Mixtape)
- 2007: J-Nas - Asian R&B
- 2008: Sonny Brown - Please Come Again
- 2008: DJ Sanj - Bollywood Punk
- 2010: Mel Karade Rabba Soundtrack
- 2010: Desi Hustle
- 2010: Sammy Gill - Pegg (featuring Deep Cold) - Single
- 2011: Arnie B - Hey Mama (featuring Deep Cold) - Single
- 2011: Sam Sahotra - Lakh Tera Hiley (featuring Deep Cold) - Single (Produced by Dj Aman)
- 2011: Sheetal Kayshap - Boliya (featuring Deep Cold) (Produced by DJ Precious)
- 2011: SK1 - Saal Solvan Tap Gayi (featuring Deep Cold) (Produced by Jaspal Soos)
- 2012: Mandeep Dhaliwal - Jagga (featuring Deep Cold) (Dirty South Mix) from the Motion Picture "Pseudo: Blood of Our Own" Soundtrack
- 2012: DJ Sanj - Bad Boyz
- 2013: DJ Sanj - Valeti Daru
- 2014: IMM - The Album
- 2014: Mika Singh - Shake That Booty (featuring Deep Cold) from the Bollywood Movie Soundtrack "Balwinder Singh Famous Ho Gaya". The video clip features former pornographic actress Sunny Leone
- 2016: Thiêu Thân - Táo ft Cào from Deep

== See also ==
- Houston hip-hop
