= Velli =

Velli may refer to:

- Benedetto Velli, Italian painter of the Baroque period
- Velli (album), of 2005 by Punjabi singer Kulwinder Dhillon
- Vellus hair (plural velli), a fine hair on mammals

== See also ==
- Alex Vellis, Greek–British poet, playwright, producer and installation artist
