= Japji Khaira =

Australian actress

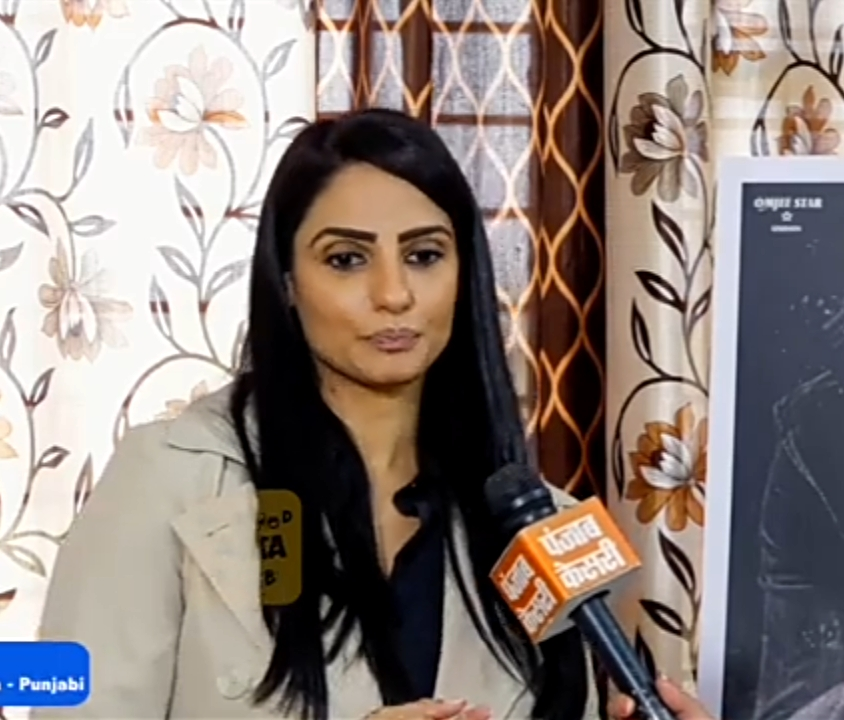
- Khaira in 2020
- Born: Ludhiana, Punjab, India
- Occupations: Actress; model
- Years active: 2007 present
- Website: Japji Khaira on Instagram

Japji Khaira is an Australian actress and model. She won the 'Miss World Punjaban 2006' title held in Ludhiana, becoming the first non-Indian citizen to win it.

== Career ==
After winning the title of Miss World Punjaban, Japji Khaira made her debut in the movie Mitti Wajaan Maardi (2007) opposite Harbhajan Maan. She was in Fer Mamla Gadbad Gadbad in the lead role. She had a cameo role in Dharti (2011). She also appeared in Singh vs Kaur.

== Filmography ==
=== Films ===
Year	Film	Role	Special Notes
2007	Mitti Wajaan Maardi	Preet	
2011	Dharti	Suhana	
2012	Taur Mittran Di	Guest appearance	Song "Tere Darshan Di Bhukh"
2013	Singh vs Kaur	Simrat	
2013	Fer Mamla Gadbad Gadbad	Geet	
2013	Bhaji in Problem	Roop	Guest Appearance
2014	Ishq Brandy	Simran	
2018	Kurmaiyan	Paali	
2018	Son Of Manjeet Singh	Preeti	
2019	Ardaas 2		
2019	Naukar Vahuti Da	Pinky	
2022	Dakuaan Da Munda 2	Amrat	
