= Tera Mera Ki Rishta =

- Directed by: Navaniat Singh
- Produced by: Mukesh Sharma
- Starring: Jimmy Sheirgill; Kulraj Randhawa; Anupam Kher; Raj Babbar; Archana Puran Singh
- Cinematography: Harmeet Singh
- Music by: Jaidev Kumar
- Production company: Spice Cinevision
- Distributed by: Eros International
- Release date: 10 April 2009
- Country: India
- Language: Punjabi
- Box office: ₹47.8 million

Tera Mera Ki Rishta is a 2009 Indian Punjabi language romantic drama film directed by Navaniat Singh and produced by Mukesh Sharma. The film stars Jimmy Sheirgill and Kulraj Randhawa along with Anupam Kher, Raj Babbar, Archana Puran Singh, Gurpreet Ghuggi, Binnu Dhillon, Rana Ranbir, Balkaran Brar, Tee Jay Sidhu, Dolly Minhas and Akshita in supporting roles. The film was released worldwide on 10 April 2009 and had earned $108,741 in first two weeks. The film was produced by Spice Cine Vision Studios and was distributed by Eros International. The movie was stated to be the costliest Punjabi film ever made and was the first Punjabi movie to be shot in Switzerland. The film is a remake of the 2005 Telugu film Nuvvostanante Nenoddantana.

== Plot ==
While on a trip with for a family wedding, Meet, a young man seeking adventure and thrills, falls for a woman named Raijo despite their different cultural upbringings. However, unbeknownst to Meet, Meet's mother is simultaneously arranging a marriage for him.

== Cast ==
- Jimmy Sheirgill as Meet
- Kulraj Randhawa as Rajjo
- Anupam Kher as Meet's Father Mohinder
- Raj Babbar as Rajjo's Father Kabir
- Archana Puran Singh as Meet's Mother Natasha
- Gurpreet Ghuggi as Ballu
- Akshita Vasudeva as Harman Kaur
- Rana Ranbir as G Ja G
- Binnu Dhillon as Shingara
- Balkaran Brar
- Teejay Sidhu as Honey
- Dolly Minhas as Rajjo's Aunt
- Harbi Sangha

== Soundtrack ==
Tera Mera Ki Rishta

Soundtrack album by Jaidev Kumar
- Released: 10 April 2009
- Genre: Feature film soundtrack
- Length: 38:58
- Language: Punjabi
- Label: Eros Music
External audio
- Audio Jukebox on YouTube

The soundtrack album of Tera Mera Ki Rishta consists of 8 songs composed by Jaidev Kumar, the lyrics of which were written by Irshad Kamil and Jaggi Singh.

Tracklist
No.	Title	Singer(s)	Length
1.	"Hatthaan Diya Lakiraan"	Alka Yagnik & Feroz Khan	06:02
2.	"Jag Khasma Nu Khaave"	Kavita Krishnamurti & Preeti Uttam Singh	05:38
3.	"Jag To Luko Ke Rakkhi"	Sunidhi Chauhan & Feroz Khan	04:02
4.	"Zindagi De Rang"	Iddu Shariff & Feroz Khan	03:47
5.	"Play the Dhol"	Sukhwinder Singh	04:31
6.	"Can You Tell Me Sohniye"	Mika Singh	04:00
7.	"Rounak Shounak"	Feroz Khan, Maqbool, Lakhwinder Wadali, Masha Ali, Kulwinder Kally & Simerjit Kumar, Lehmbhar Hussainpuri, Pammi Bai, Ravinder Grewal, Inderjit Nikku, Harjeet Harman	07:32
8.	"Play the Dhol" (Remix by DJ Sanj)	Sukhwinder Singh	03:26
Total length:			38:58
