= Shareek =

- Release poster
- Directed by: Navaniat Singh
- Written by: Dheeraj Rattan
- Produced by: Jas Bhatia; R. S. Gill; Vivek Ohri
- Starring: Jimmy Sheirgill; Mahie Gill; Guggu Gill; Kuljinder Singh Sidhu; Mukul Dev
- Cinematography: Harmeet Singh; Jitan Harmeet Singh
- Edited by: Manish More
- Music by: Jaidev Kumar; Kuwar Virk
- Production companies: Green Planet Production; Ohri Productions
- Distributed by: White Hill Studios
- Release date: 22 October 2015
- Running time: 137 minutes
- Country: India
- Language: Punjabi

Shareek is a 2015 Punjabi musical drama film directed by Navaniat Singh, starring Jimmy Sheirgill, Mahie Gill, Guggu Gill, Simar Gill, Oshin Sai, Mukul Dev, Kuljinder Singh Sidhu, Prince KJ, Hobby Dhaliwal, and Gulchoo Jolly. It was produced under the banner of Ohri Productions and Green Planet Production. It was first released on 22 October 2015. Mukul Dev was awarded the PTC Punjabi film awards for best actor in a negative role for his performance in the movie.

== Plot ==
Two families fight over land that belonged to their father/grandfather. Jassa and Surjit take care of the land that their grandfather gave to them. Their cousins are envious of them. One day, Pali and Dara murder Pavitar (Jassa & Surjeet's father). Jassa takes revenge by killing Pali. After killing Pali, his brother forces Jassa to leave India. Ekam leaves with his chacha. Jassa leaves Jassi, whom he loves. There is a ten-year leap. Agam marries Roohi. The land that had belonged to Jassa's father was put on trial. After some time, the court makes Agam the rightful owner of the land. Dara gets envious and hires a truck that hits Agam, causing him to die. Jassa comes back to India after he finds out that his nephew was killed. Roohi is made the owner of the land. Dara makes a plan and asks Roohi's father if Roohi and his brother can get married. Roohi's father agreed. Ekam comes back to India and learns that his brother has died.the family asks him to marry Roohi, and he agrees. Jassa kills Dara, which causes him to go to prison. When he is released in 2015, his son, Zorawar kills him by shooting him in the head. (Zorawar is the son of Jassa and Jassi).

== Cast ==
- Jimmy Sheirgill as Jassa Brar
- Mahie Gill as Jassi Brar (née Sidhu)
- Guggu Gill as Surjit Singh Brar
- Mukul Dev as Didar Singh 'Dara' Brar
- Simar Gill in a dual role as
  - Agam Brar
  - Ekam Brar
- Prince Kanwaljit Singh Bant Brar
- Kuljinder Singh Sidhu as Pali Brar
- Oshin Sai as Roohi
- Hobby Dhaliwal as Nachattar Singh Brar
- Gurpreet Bhangu
- Gulchoo Jolly as Kulwant
- Gurveer Singh Saini
- Sahebveer Singh Saini

== Music ==
Shareek

Soundtrack album by Jaidev Kumar & Kuwar Virk
- Genre: Feature film soundtrack
- Length: 24:01
- Language: Punjabi
- Label: Eros Now

The soundtrack of the album is composed by Jaidev Kumar with lyrics written by Kumaar, Davinder Khannewala, Happy Raikoti & Preet Harpal

No.	Title	Lyrics	Music	Singer(s)	Length
1.	"Dil Kafiraa"	kumaar	Jaidev Kumar	Mickey Singh	5:36
2.	"Mainu Ishq Lagaa"	Davinder Khannewala	Jaidev Kumar	Shaukat Ali Matoi, Sanj V, Shipra Goyal	4:21
3.	"ShareekeBaazi"	Happy Raikoti	Jaidev Kumar	Sippy Gill	4:56
4.	"Mere Saiyaan"		Jaidev Kumar	Javed Bashir	4:40
5.	"Pangey"	Preet Harpal	Kuwar Virk	Preet Harpal	2:17
6.	"Boliyan"		Jaidev Kumar	Simerjit Kumar	2:28
Total length:					24:01

== Critical reception ==
Jasmine Singh of The Tribune reviewed the film as "a disjointed drama".

== Sequel ==
The sequel to this 2015 film, titled Shareek 2 will hit the screens on 29 April 2022, under the banner of Ohri Productions, and White Hill Studios. The sequel stars Jimmy Sheirgill(Retained) and Dev Kharoud and will bring back Navaniat Singh as the director.
