= Surveen Chawla =

Indian actress and dancer (b. 1984)

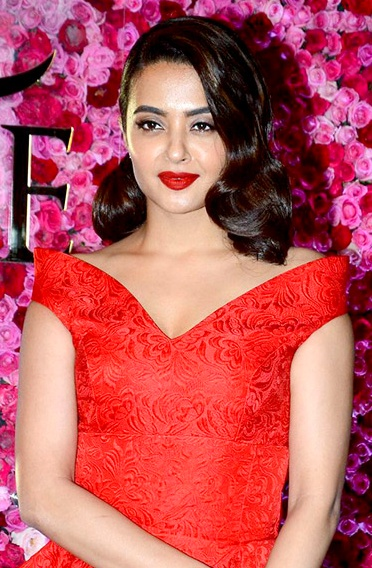
- Chawla in 2016
- Born: 1 August 1984 (age 41); Chandigarh, India
- Education: Chandigarh College for Women, Chandigarh
- Occupations: Actress, model
- Years active: 2003–present
- Spouse: Akshay Thakker (m. 2015)
- Children: 1

Surveen Chawla (born 1 August 1984) is an Indian actress and dancer who appears in Hindi and Punjabi films and television. She is one of the highest paid Punjabi actresses. She started her career with television shows like Kahin To Hoga and Kaajjal. She is known for her roles in movies and shows like Hate Story 2 (2014), Ugly (2013), Parched (2015) and 24 (2016) along with many other films. In 2018, she was seen in the Hindi web series Haq Se.

== Career ==
=== Television debut ===
Chawla first was one of the final 25 of the Channel [V]'s reality show Coke [V] Popstars season 2 in 2003. Chawla made her television debut as Charu in the Indian serial Kahin To Hoga. She also appeared in the reality dance show Ek Khiladi Ek Haseena in 2008, where she paired up with Indian cricketer S. Sreesanth. Before this, she appeared in the television serial Kasautii Zindagi Kay in 2004. In 2006, she played the lead protagonist in the TV serial Kaajjal, till 2007. She hosted the television show Comedy Circus Ke SuperStars. Then she made her film debut with Kannada film Paramesha Panwala. In 2011, she appeared in the Punjabi film Dharti which was released in April 2011. Thereafter she has appeared in the Punjabi films Taur Mittran Di, Saadi Love Story, Singh vs Kaur, Lucky Di Unlucky Story and Disco Singh (2014). She did her first item number "Dhoka Dhoka" in Sajid Khan's Himmatwala. In 2013, she appeared in Tamil film Moondru Per Moondru Kadhal and also appeared in Puthiya Thiruppangal. She then appeared in Anurag Kashyap's thriller Ugly.

=== 2014–2017 ===
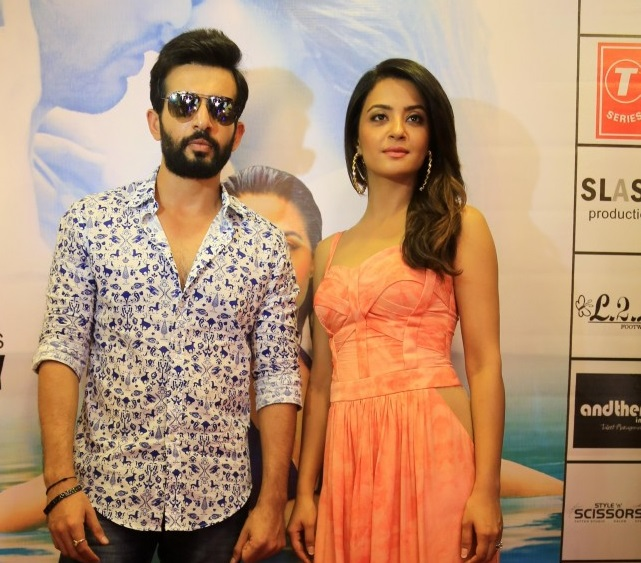
Chawla with her co-star Jay Bhanushali during the promotions of Hate Story 2 in 2014

In October 2014, Chawla appeared in the hit Punjabi song 'Mitran De Boot' along with Jazzy B. In 2014, she also played in Vishal Pandya's erotic revenge thriller Hate Story 2, a sequel to Hate Story (2012) where she portrayed the role of Sonika Prasad, a girl who takes the revenge with those peoples who abused her physically and mentally, as well as who murdered her boyfriend Akshay Bedi (played by Jay Bhanushali), the film was her first women centric film and was successful critically and commercially. Then she appeared in song "Sawan Aaya Hai" opposite Rajneesh Duggal in the film Creature 3D. Her latest Tamil film was Jaihind 2. She appeared in a song "Tuti Bole Wedding Di" in the Hindi film Welcome Back and in a Punjabi film Hero Naam Yaad Rakhi opposite Jimmy Shergill. She also played the role of Bijli in Parched (2015). In 2016, Surveen appeared and participated in Jhalak Dikhhla Jaa but later got voted out in a double elimination along with Arjun Bijlani.

=== 2018–present ===
In 2018, Chawla made her debut in digital space with ALT Balaji's web series Haq Se opposite Rajeev Khandelwal. Set in the turbulent terrorist infested Kashmir, the story revolves around the Mirza sisters. Surveen plays Mehr Mirza, the eldest of the four sisters in the series.

== Personal life ==
Chawla married Akshay Thakker in 2015 in Italy. She revealed about her wedding two years later via Twitter on 27 December 2017. She gave birth to a daughter on 15 April 2019

== Filmography ==
=== Films ===
Key
†	Denotes the films that have not yet been released

Year	Title	Role	Language	Notes
2008	Paramesha Panwala	Shruti	Kannada	
2009	Raju Maharaju	Sneha	Telugu	
2011	Dharti	Bani	Punjabi	
2011	Hum Tum Shabana	Shabana	Hindi	
2011	Taur Mittran Di	Keerat	Punjabi	
2013	Saadi Love Story	Preeti	Punjabi	
2013	Singh vs Kaur	Jasneet Kaur	Punjabi	
2013	Himmatwala	Herself	Hindi	Special appearance in song "Dhoka Dhoka"
2013	Lucky Di Unlucky Story	Seerat	Punjabi	
2013	Moondru Per Moondru Kadhal	Divya	Tamil	
2013	Ugly	Rakhi Malhotra	Hindi	
2014	Disco Singh	Sweety	Punjabi	
2014	Hate Story 2	Sonika Prasad	Hindi	
2014	Creature 3D	Herself	Hindi	Special appearance in song "Sawan Aaya Hai"
2014	Jaihind 2 / Abhimanyu	Nandhini	Tamil; Kannada; Telugu	
2015	Hero 'Naam Yaad Rakhi'	Hina Kaur	Punjabi	
2015	Welcome Back	cameo (item song)	Hindi	Special appearance in song "Tutti Bole Marriage Di"
2015	Parched	Bijli	Hindi	
2017	Chhuri		Hindi	Short film

=== Television ===
Year	Show	Role	Notes	Ref(s)
2003–2007	Kahin To Hoga	Charu		
2005–2006	Kasautii Zindagi Kay	Kasak Bajaj		
2006–2007	Kaajjal	Kaajjal Behl / Kaajjal Dev Pratab Singh		
2008	Ek Khiladi Ek Haseena	Contestant		
2010	Comedy Circus Ke Superstars	Host		
2016	Jhalak Dikhhla Jaa 9	Contestant		
2016	24	Maya	season 2	
2018	Teen Pehliiyan	Mamta		
2018	Haq Se	Dr. Meher Mirza		
2019	Famously Filmfare Punjabi	Host		
2018–2019	Rangoli	Host/presenter		
2018–2019	Sacred Games	Jojo Mascarenas		
2021	Decoupled	Shruti		
2023–Present	Rana Naidu	Naina Naidu		
2025	Criminal Justice: A Family Matter	Anju Nagpal		
2025	Mandala Murders	Ananya Bharadwaj		
2025	Andhera	Ayesha		

== Awards and nominations ==
Year	Work	Award	Category	Result	Ref.
2011	Dharti	PTC Punjabi Film Awards	Best Debut Female	Won	
2015	Disco Singh	PTC Punjabi Film Awards	Best Actress	Won	
2016	Parched	Indian Film Festival of Los Angeles for Grand Jury Prize	Best Actress	Won (Note: Shared with Radhika Apte, Tannishtha Chatterjee and Lehar Khan.)	
2017	Parched	Star Screen Awards	Best Supporting Actress	Nominated	
