= Rajan Batra =

Indian film producer

- Born: Rajan Batra; Punjab
- Occupations: Film Producer, Distributor, Exhibitor
- Years active: 2009–Onwards
- Organisation(s): Daddy Mohan Records, Batrashowbiz & Jivi records
- Awards: Best Film Award of PIFFA (Punjabi International Film Festival Awards Toronto Canada) for Movie Jihne Mera Dil Luteya

Rajan Batra is a film producer and distributor, predominantly working in Punjabi films. He began his career as a film producer.

== Career ==
Rajan started his business as a lawyer in 2003. He moved on to various other businesses like share broking distribution of films along with pursuing his dream of making films. He established his business and entered into film production in 2009 and produced his first Punjabi film Mel karde Rabba film in collaboration with Tips Industries. He also went on to produce Jihne Mera Dil Luteya, a first Punjabi blockbuster (2010), Yaar Annmulle (2012), Pure Punjabi (2012), Pinky Moge Wali (2013), Viyah 70 km (2013), Mere Yaar Kaminey (2014), under banner of Batra Showbiz.

== Batra Showbiz ==
Rajan batra formed a production and distribution company named Batra Showbiz, which associated with Kapil Batra Production, Topaz Films and now Beatrix Entertainment to form the following distribution and production companies..few Hindi movies were released by his distribution company.

- Virudh
- Heroine
- Carry on Jatta
- Pata Nahi Rabb Kehdeyan Rangan Ch Raazi
- Power Cut
- Saadi Gali Aaya Karo
- Punjab bolda
- . The best seller
- . Chudail story
- . Khel toh ab shuru hoga
- . Love key funday
- . Coffee with D
- . Yeh toh to much ho gaya
- . Bramaad nayak SAI baba
- . Ram Rattan
- . pinki Mogewali 2
- . Ringa Ringa Roses

== Filmography ==
- Mel Karade Rabba (Producer)
- Jihne Mera Dil Luteya (Producer)
- Yaar Annmulle (Producer)
- Pure Punjabi (Producer)
- Pinky Moge Wali (Producer)
- Viyah 70 km (Producer)
- Mere Yaar Kaminey (Producer)
- . Yaar Anmulle 2 (producer)
- . Kache Dhagey (producer)
- . Titoo MBA. (Producer)
- . Jugni yaaran di (producer)
- . Jagga jagrava joga (producer)
- . Yaar Anmulle returns (producer)
- . Mavaan Thandian Chavan (producer) punjabi serial for zee punjabi
- . Kutte fail (producer)
- . Tedda Medha sada veda (zee punjabi)

== Awards ==
- Best Film Award of PIFFA (Punjabi International Film Festival Awards Toronto Canada) for Jihne Mera Dil Luteya
- Best Music Award For Yaar Annmulle.
