= Kaajjal =

Indian drama television series

- Also known as: Kaajjal - Sabbki Aankhon Mein Basi
- Created by: Shreya Creations
- Directed by: Sandip Sikcand
- Starring: See below
- Music by: Abhijeet Hegdepatil
- Opening theme: "Kaajjal" by Prajakta Shukre
- Country of origin: India
- No. of seasons: 1
- No. of episodes: 252

Production
- Running time: approximately 22 minutes

Original release
- Network: Sony Entertainment Television
- Release: 9 October 2006 – 20 December 2007

Kaajjal – Sabbki Aankhon Mein Basi, commonly known as Kaajjal is an Indian daily television serial that aired on Sony TV. This show replaced the previous show Kaisa Ye Pyar Hai. It centers around a young woman named Kaajjal, who hails from the small town of Mussourie, looking for the love of her life and finds instead Dev.

== Plot ==
Kaajjal Behl (Surveen Chawla), a young, good-natured woman, comes from her small town to make it big and find the love of her life. She is an RJ with a popular morning show. However, instead of Prince Charming, she finds Dev Pratapsingh (Apurva Agnihotri), an angry, arrogant man, who is the scion of an industrialist family. He is bitter towards life as his first love has died. He generally, keeps everyone at distance, including his friends and family. They vow never to meet again, but they do.

When Kaajjal reaches Mumbai after winning an RJ hunt, she works in Dev's office. In a drunken state, Dev confesses his love to Kaajjal, when he actually meant his ex-wife, Payal. Kaajjal is misunderstood and she falls in love with Dev. Dev avoids her at every cost. His friend, Dhruv, who just came back from the U.S., sees Kaajjal and falls in love with her at first sight. Dev and Kaajjal become friends; the more their friendship grew, the feelings Dev had for Kaajjal grew, too. Later, Dev wants to propose to Kaajjal. At the last moment he finds out about Dhruv liking her. He is heartbroken and stays away from Kaajjal. Not only that, he finds out he has a "shani" in his horoscope which could cause his death. And if he marries Kaajjal, the "shani" from his horoscope could fall on Kaajjal which would cause her death.

Kaajjal is still in love with Dev and tries to get close to him. Dev decides to get Kaajjal and Dhruv married and, with his evil sister-in-law, Amisha, who wants Dev to die, brings a marriage proposal on behalf of Dhruv. Dev doesn't tell who is the proposal from, and Kaajjal and her family thinking its from Dev agree. Dev invites Kaajjal to his hotel room one night, and he tries to misbehave with her. She is shocked to see lust in his eyes and slaps him. She runs away from there and Dev is happy to know that now she hates him, and at least now she will marry Dhruv.

Now Dev and Kaajjal are married to each other. Karan is bent on getting his revenge... 6 September is the last day for DK... After that a new reincarnation track will start as Dev and Kaajjal take a new birth and find each other, fall in love after knowing about their past life, and taking revenge against Karan. After going through all the trial and tribulations, Dev and Kaajjal finally gets married! All the villains — Karan, Kamayani, and Ranveer — die in a shootout, and the story ends!

== Cast ==
- Surveen Chawla as Kaajjal Behl / Kaajjal Dev Pratapsingh (Dead)
- Apurva Agnihotri as Dev Pratapsingh (Dead)
- Vineeta Thakur / Tuhina Vohra as Nandini Karan Pratapsingh
- Rohit Bakshi as Karan Pratapsingh (Dead)
- Kinshuk Mahajan as Devendra "Dev"
- Deepak Bajaj as Veer Pratapsingh
- Kishwer Merchant as Amisha Veer Pratapsingh
- Sachin Tyagi as Aditya Garewal
- Shaleen Bhanot as Shivansh Kapoor
- Rita Bhaduri as Bimmo Bua (Kaajjal's Aunt)
- Rocky Verma as Kidnapper
- Chahatt Khanna as Katie / Kaajjal
- Praneet Bhat as Bunty
- Rati Agnihotri as Nayantara Pratapsingh (Dead)
- Paritosh Sand as Satyaprakash Behl (Kaajjal's Father)
- Chetan Hansraj as Dhruv (Dev Pratapsingh's Best Friend)
- Rakshanda Khan as Kamayani (Dead)
- Yash Sinha as Ranveer (Kamayani's Brother) (Dead)
- Neelu Kohli as Devendra's Aunt
- Rituraj Singh as Katie / Kaajjal's Father
- Adita Wahi as Sonia
- Shama Sikander as Chameli
- Simple Kaul

== Production ==
The production house was Twenty Twenty and later on Shreya Creations took over.
