= Gugu Gill =

Indian film actor

Guggu Gill
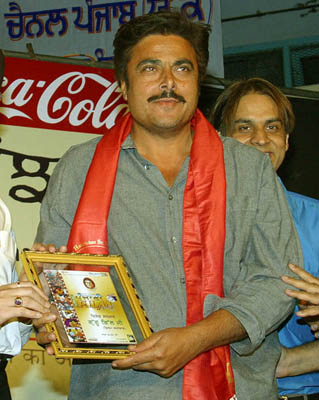
- Gugu Gill in 2007
- Born: Kulwinder Singh Gill; January 14, 1960 (age 66); Mahni Khera, Punjab
- Occupation: Actor
- Years active: 1983-present
- Children: Guramrit Gill; Gurjot Gill

Kulwinder Singh Gill (born 14 January 1960), better known as Guggu Gill, is an Indian film actor who mainly works in Punjabi cinema. He is one of the leading actors in Punjabi cinema in the 1990s along with Yograj Singh. He has done 65-70 films so far.

== Career ==
Gill debuted with a minor role in super-hit Putt Jattan De (1983) in a dog fight scene. He has starred in films including Jatt Jeona Morh, Truck Driver, Badla Jatti Da and Jatt Te Zameen. He is known for the villainous role he played in Gabhroo Punjab Da. His career as leading hero has paired him with top female artists from Punjabi cinema like Daljeet Kaur, Upasana Singh, Priti Sapru, Manjeet Kullar and Ravinder Maan. Gill has done 7-8 films with director Ravinder Ravi, including hits like Anakh Jattan Di, Jatt Jeona Morh and Pratigya. For his outstanding contribution to Punjabi cinema, the actor was conferred with the Lifetime Achievement Award at the PTC Punjabi film awards in 2013.

== Personal life ==
He was born into Gill Jat family, Gill is a resident of Mahni Khera village near Malout city in Muktsar District of Punjab (India).

== Filmography ==
- Putt Jattan De (1983) .... Dog fight scene (friendly appearance)
- Chhora Haryane Da (1985) ... Jagroop 'Jaggu' (Haryanvi Punjabi movie)
- Gabhroo Punjab Da (1986) .... Jagroop 'Jaggu'
- Jatt Te Zameen (1989) .... Jagga
- Qurbani Jatt Di (1990) .... Naahra
- Anakh Jattan Di (1990) .... Jagga
- Jatt Jeona Mour (1991) .... Jeona Morh
- Yaaran Naal Baharan (1991) .... Jageer Singh/Gurmeet (dual role)
- Jorr Jatt Da (1991) .... Jagga
- Badla Jatti Da (1991) - Jagga
- Dil Da Mamla (1992) .... Jeet
- Putt Sardaran De (1992) .... Dulla
- Lalkara Jatti Da (1993) .... Jagga
- Baaghi Soormey (1993) .... Jagga
- Mirza Jatt (1993) .... Mirza
- Vairi (1994) .... Bans Singh 'Bansaa'
- Mera Punjab (1994) .... SSP Shamsher Singh
- Pratigya (1995) .... Noora
- Zaildaar (1995) .... Zaildaar Jora
- Smuggler (1996) .... Deva (Hindi movie)
- Sardari (1997) .... Harjinder Singh ‘Jinda’
- Jung Da Maidan (1997) .... Jaswant 'Jassa'
- Truck Driver (1997) .... Jagga
- Purja-Purja Katt Mare (1998) .... Shivdev Singh ‘Shabba’
- Muqadder (1999) .... Sardar Ajit Singh
- Sikandera (2001) .... Sikandera
- Badla: The Revenge (2003) .... Shamsher Singh
- Nalayak (2005) .... Tiger
- Rustam-e-Hind (2006) .... Jagtar Singh
- Mehndi Wale Hath (2006) .... Ranjeet Singh
- Vidroh (2007) .... Jagga
- Majaajan (2007) .... Faqeer Baba
- Kaun Kise Da Beli (2008) .... Guest Appearance
- Mera Pind (2008) .... Mr. Bhullar- Himmat's brother
- Luv U Bobby (2009) .... Colonel Sandhu
- Akhiyaan Udeekdian (2009) .... Dilsher
- Heer Ranjha: A True Love Story (2009) .... Saida Kherha
- Siyasat (2009) .... Prof. Jarnail Singh
- Jawani Zindabad (2010) .... Joginder Singh
- Ik Kudi Punjab Di (2010) .... Professor Gill
- Kabaddi Ikk Mohabbat (2010) .... Gurnam Randhawa
- Simran (2010) .... Jarnail Singh
- Rehmataan (2012) .... Kulwinder Singh (TV Movie)
- Ajj De Ranjhe (2012) .... SSP- Punjab Police
- Stupid 7 (2013) .... Jass- Parry's father
- Jatt Boys Putt Jattan De (2013) .... Shinda Singh Brar
- Ronde Sare Vyah Picho (2013) .... Mr. Brar
- Aa Gaye Munde U.K. De (2014)
- Dilli 1984 (2014)
- Gun & Goal (2015) .... Jagbeer Singh Gill
- The Mastermind: Jinda Sukha (2015)
- Dildariyaan (2015) .... Ajmer Sidhu
- Shareek (2015) .... Surjeet
- 25 kille (2016) .... Saudagar Singh
- Kinna Karde Ha Pyar (2016) .... Professor Daura (TV Movie)
- Sardar Saab (2017) .... Nishchay Singh
- Lahoriye (2017) .... Jorawar Singh
- Subedar Joginder Singh (2018) .... Maan Singh
- Khido Khundi (2018) .... Balveer Singh
- Qismat (2018) .... SHO Gurnam Singh
- Jindari (2018) .... SSP Brar (TV Movie)
- Bhajjo Veero Ve (2018) .... Bakhtaawar
- Dulla Vaily (2019) .... Daleep Singh 'Dulla'
- Lukan Michi (2019) .... Daler Singh Sarpanch
- Jaddi Sardar (2019) .... Jagtar Singh 'Jagga'
- Aasra (2019) .... Daara
- Jora -The Second Chapter (2020) .... Chaudhary Dharamveer Chautala
- Shikaari (2021) ..... Jeeta (Web Series)
- Bajre Da Sitta (2022)
- Oye Makhna (2022)
- Teri Meri Gal Ban Gayi (2022)
- Nishana (2022)
- Jaggo Aayi Aa (2025)
- Majhail (2025)
