= Dolly Minhas =

Indian actress

- Born: Dolly Minhas; 8 February 1968 (age 58); Chandigarh, India
- Occupations: Model, actress
- Years active: 1991–present
- Spouse: Anil Mattoo (m. 1997)

Dolly Mattoo (née Minhas) (born 8 February 1968) is an Indian actress, former model and beauty pageant titleholder who won Miss India Universe 1988 and represented her country at Miss Universe 1989. She has acted in Hindi, Punjabi, Telugu and Kannada films. She has also worked in Hindi TV shows such as Iss Pyaar Ko Kya Naam Doon? Ek Baar Phir and Choti Sarrdaarni. During the 1990s, she worked in negative shades in Mukesh Khanna's popular serial Mahayoddha as Rajkumari Bijli and in Shaktimaan as Shaliyaa - Catwoman; considered as India's first actress to play Catwoman (including Ashwini Kalsekar, with whom she shared the screen as her elder sister).

== Biography ==
She belongs to Punjab and was raised in Chandigarh. She fell in love with the director of her first film, Anil Mattoo, whom she eventually married. She later acted in some Punjabi and Kannada films and Hindi TV serials.

== Television ==
- Hindustani (1996-1999)
- Dil Vil Pyar Vyar (1998)
- Shaktimaan (1999)
- Ramayan (2001-2002)
- Vishnu Puran (2003)
- Mamla Gadbad Hai (2001)
- Zindagi Milke Bitange (2001)
- Aisa Des Hai Mera (2006)
- Grihasti (2008)
- Baa Bahoo Aur Baby (2010)
- Behenein (2010/2011)
- Chintu Chinki Aur Ek Badi Si Love Story (2011/2012)
- Byaah Hamari Bahoo Ka (2012)
- Punar Vivah (2013)
- Savdhaan India (2014)
- Hukum Mere Aaka...
- Iss Pyaar Ko Kya Naam Doon? Ek Baar Phir (2015)
- Kota Toppers (2015)
- Adhuri Kahaani Hamari (2015)
- Dil Se Dil Tak
- Silsila Badalte Rishton Ka
- Choti Sarrdaarni (2019–2022)
- Shaadi Mubarak (2020–2021)
- Ghum Hai Kisikey Pyaar Meiin (2021)
- Prem Leela (2024–2025)
- Lakshmi Niwas (2026–present)

== Filmography ==
=== Hindi films ===
- Dastoor (1991)
- Mr. Bond (1992)
- Kshatriya (1993)
- Game (1993)
- Ab Ke Baras (2002)
- Pyaar Mein Twist (2005)
- Don Muthu Swami (2008)
- Good Luck! (2008)
- Dil Dhadakne Do (2015)
- Kabir Singh (2019)

=== Telugu film ===
- Sriman Brahmachari (1992)

=== Swedish films ===
- Bombay Dreams (2004)

=== Punjabi films ===
- Mitti Wajaan Maardi (2007)
- Sat Sri Akal (2008)
- Tera Mera Ki Rishta (2009)
- Mel Karade Rabba (2010)
- Jatt & Juliet 2 (2013)

=== Kannada films ===
- Rayaru Bandaru Mavana Manege (1993)
- Mr. Mahesh Kumar (1994)...Silky
- Musuku (1994)
- Makkala Sakshi (1994)
- Yama kinkara (1995)
- Chiranjeevi Rajegowda (1995)
- Mr. Vasu (1995)...Sahana
- Honey Moon (1996)
- Rambo Raja Revolver Rani (1996)
- Kalavida (1997)
