= Khadari =

2024 Indian film

- Directed by: Manav Shah
- Screenplay by: Dheeraj Kedarnath Rattan
- Story by: Dheeraj Kedarnath Rattan
- Produced by: Paramjit Singh, Ravish Abrol, Akashdeep Chally & Gagandeep Chally
- Starring: Gurnam Bhullar; Surbhi Jyoti; Kartar Cheema; Lakha Lakhwinder Singh; Prabh Grewal; Navdeep Kaler
- Cinematography: Ritchie Burton
- Edited by: Hardik Singh Reen
- Release date: 9 February 2024
- Running time: 122 minutes
- Country: India
- Language: Punjabi

Khadari is a 2024 Indian Punjabi-language action drama film directed by Manav Shah. It stars Gurnam Bhullar, Surbhi Jyoti, Kartar Cheema, Lakha Lakhwinder Singh, Prabh Grewal and Navdeep Kaler in the lead roles. The film is written by Dheeraj Kedarnath Rattan.

== Plot ==
Khadari, which translates to "sportsman" in Punjabi, tells the story of Guru, a charismatic and talented 23-year-old who reigns supreme as the college wrestling champion. He catches the eye of Amrit, the 22-year-old captain of the kho-kho team, and a beautiful love story blossoms between them. However, their budding romance faces a significant hurdle when Amrit uncovers a dark secret from Guru's past. This secret, the nature of which remains undisclosed, throws their relationship into turmoil and forces Amrit to confront difficult choices.

The plot revolves around Guru's struggle to overcome his past, win back Amrit's trust, and prove himself worthy of her love. Whether he can overcome this emotional and personal challenge, and whether their love can withstand the test of time, forms the core of the film's narrative. While the official plot summary doesn't delve into the specifics of Guru's past, the trailer hints at a potential connection to a crime or mistake he committed. It also suggests that the film explores themes of forgiveness, redemption, and the complexities of relationships.

== Cast ==
- Gurnam Bhullar as Guru
- Surbhi Jyoti as Amrit
- Kartar Cheema as Jally
- Lakha Lakhwinder Singh as Malkeet Singh
- Prabh Grewal
- Navdeep Kaler
- Manjit Singh
- Sanju Solanki
- Dheeraj Kumar
- Rahul Jungral

== Soundtrack ==
The film songs are sung by Gurnam Bhullar and Lyrics by Gurnam Bhullar, Fateh Shergill, Kaptaan.

Track listing
No.	Title	Lyrics	Music	Length
1.	"Viah Ke Laija" (Gurnam Bhullar)	Kaptaan	Desi Crew	3:50
2.	"Amma Jaye" (Gurnam Bhullar)	Gurnam Bhullar	Desi Crew	3:13
3.	"Wakh Hona Na Aawe" (Gurnam Bhullar)	Gurnam Bhullar	Dady Beats	2:23
4.	"Khadari (Title Track)" (Gurnam Bhullar)	Gurnam Bhullar	Dady Beats	3:20
5.	"Nashe Diya Purhiyan" (Gurnam Bhullar)	Gurnam Bhullar	Himanshu Sharma	2:38
6.	"Daang Te Dera" (Gurnam Bhullar)	Fateh Shergill	Daddy Beats	2:33
Total length:				17:57

== Release ==
The film was theatrically released worldwide on 9 February 2024 in Punjabi language. The veteran actor Dharmendra gave blessings for Gurnam Bhullar's film.
