= Badla Jatti Da =

- Directed by: Ravinder Ravi
- Release date: 4 January 1991
- Country: India
- Language: Punjabi

Badla Jatti Da is a 1991 Punjabi film It is considered among the greatest hits and is classic cult movie in the history of Punjabi cinema. The film stars Gugu Gill and Yograj Singh. The antagonist role played by Yograj Singh is considered one of his best.Sunita Dhir played the protagonist in the 1991 woman-centric blockbuster ‘Badla Jatti Da’, a rare feat in Pollywood in that decade. This films stars Gugu Gill and Yograj Singh.

== Synopsis ==
Pregnant Gulabo is devastated when her entire family is slaughtered by Jaildar Jung Singh and his goons, when the latter finds out that her brother-in-law, Jasbinder, had dared to woo his sister, Bebo. Gulabo swears to avenge this humiliation by forcing a marriage between her son and Jung's daughter.

She spends the rest of her life training her son Jagga to overcome Jung and his goons. She soon realizes that her son will have to face-off Jung Singh, his goons, his three sons, and gun-toting daughter Laali (who would rather kill Jagga than wed him), as well as Choudhary Joravar Singh and his son, Shamsher, who wants to wed Laali at any cost.

== Cast ==
- Gugu Gill - Jagga
- Yograj Singh - Jaildaar Jung Singh
- Upasna Singh - Laali Kaur
- Sunita Dhir - Gulabo Kaur
- Surinder Shinda - Shinda
- Amar Noorie - Noorie
- Kulbir Baderson - Tejo Kaur
- Palvinder Dhami - Jasbinder
- Surendra Sharma - Tunda
- Yash Sharma - Choudhary Joravar Singh
- Surjit Bindrakhia - live performance
- Sharan Deep - Shamsher
