= Magical Wallet =

Indian Drama film

- Official poster of the film
- Directed by: Nitin N Kushwaha
- Written by: Nitin N Kushwaha
- Produced by: Naresh and Brothers, Gaurav Daagar (co producer)
- Starring: Jimmy Sheirgill; Sanjay Mishra; Anchal Singh; Ishtiyak Khan
- Cinematography: Santosh Thundiyil
- Production companies: Naresh & Brothers and Kalakaars entertainment
- Country: India
- Language: Hindi

Magical Wallet is an upcoming Indian Hindi-language film directed by Nitin N. Kushwaha and starring Jimmy Shergill, Sanjay Mishra, Anchal Singh, and Ishtiyak Khan. The first-look poster of Magical Wallet was unveiled at Film Bazaar 2025 in Goa, in the presence of director Nitin N. Kushwaha, executive producer Hifazat Ali, co-producer Gaurav Daagar, industry delegates, and film professionals.

== Premise ==
Set in the ancient city of Varanasi, Magical Wallet explores a story shaped by the city’s cultural energies and mystical aura. The narrative centers around a wallet with unexpected significance, creating a blend of intrigue and emotional depth as the characters navigate situations influenced by the city’s spiritual atmosphere.

== Cast ==
- Jimmy Shergill as Rajveer
- Sanjay Mishra as Arun
- Anchal Singh as Ranjana
- Ishtiyak Khan as Raju
