= Saadi Love Story =

- Directed by: Dheeraj Rattan
- Written by: Dheeraj Rattan
- Produced by: Eros Entertainment; Jimmy Shergill Productions; Aman Khatkar
- Starring: Diljit Dosanjh; Amrinder Gill; Surveen Chawla; Neetu Singh
- Edited by: Manish More
- Music by: Jaidev Kumar
- Production company: Jimmy Shergill Productions
- Release date: 11 January 2013
- Country: India
- Language: Punjabi

Saadi Love Story is a 2013 Indian Punjabi-language romantic comedy film directed by Dheeraj Rattan and starring Amrinder Gill, Diljit Dosanjh, Surveen Chawla and Neetu Singh. Jimmy Sheirgill is the co-producer. This is Dheeraj Rattan's debut movie as a director. Music for the film is given by Jaidev Kumar.

== Plot ==
Preeti's sister has been hospitalized. Rajveer (Diljit Dosanjh) and Rajveer (Amrinder Gill) both show up and claim to be her boyfriend.

== Cast ==
- Diljit Dosanjh as Rajveer / Billa
- Amrinder Gill as Rajveer
- Surveen Chawla as Preeti Kaur
- Neetu Singh as Gurleen Kaur
- Kulbhushan Kharbanda as Mr. Brar
- Dolly Ahluwalia as Mrs. Brar
- Navneet Nishan as Bhua ji
- Navjot Brar as Navi
- Mukesh Vohra
- Jimmy Sheirgill as Rajveer (Guest appearance)
- Rannvijay Singh as Vikram (Guest appearance)
- Neeru Bajwa as Tanya, Bride (Guest appearance)

== Music ==
The music is composed by Jaidev Kumar (of Dil Le Gayi Kudi Gujarat Di fame).

Track listing
No.	Title	Singer(s)	Length
1.	"Saadi Love Story"	Kunal Ganjawala, Sumitra Iyer
2.	"Rubaru"	Amrinder Gill
3.	"Aaja Bhangra Pa Laiye"	Diljit Dosanjh, Navraj Hans, Simran Tripat
4.	"Saadi Love Story (Remix)"	Navraj Hans
5.	"Laltain Nachdi"	Diljit Dosanjh, Sumitra Iyer
6.	"Saadi Love Story (Sad Version)"	Navraj Hans
7.	"Dhol Special"	Lehmber Hussainpuri, Manak-E, Sumitra Iyer
