= Sardar Saab =

- Directed by: Amit Prasher
- Screenplay by: Daljeet Kalsi
- Produced by: Gunbir Singh Sidhu; Manmord Sidhu
- Starring: Jackie Shroff; Guggu Gill; Daljeet Singh Kalsi
- Cinematography: Navneet Misser
- Edited by: Bunty Nagi
- Music by: Kaptan Laadi & RDK; Millind Gaba
- Production company: All Time Movies Pvt. Ltd.
- Distributed by: White Hill Production
- Release date: 6 January 2017
- Country: India
- Language: Punjabi

Sardar Saab is a 2017 Indian Punjabi-language action film directed by Amit Prasher and written by Daljeet Kalsi. It stars Jackie Shroff, Guggu Gill, Daljeet Kalsi, Neetu Singh, Sudesh Berry, Shivendra Mahal, Karamjit Anmol, Sardar Sohi & Yaad Grewal in the lead roles. A remake of the 2013 Tamil film Thalaivaa, the film was released worldwide on 6 January 2017.

== Cast ==
- Jackie Shroff as Sardar Sahib
- Guggu Gill
- Daljeet Kalsi
- Neetu Singh
- Sudesh Berry
- Shivendra Mahal
- Karamjit Anmol
- Sardar Sohi
- Yaad Grewal
- Saddam Dualle
- Manjeet Singh Aulakh

== Soundtrack ==
Sardar Saab

Soundtrack album by Millind Gaba, Kaptan Laadi & RDK
- Released: 22 December 2016
- Genre: Feature film soundtrack
- Length: 25:26
- Label: Music & Sound

The soundtrack of Super used was by Millind Gaba, Kaptan Laadi & RDK while the lyrics were written by Millind Gaba & Noddy Singh.

S.No	Track	Singer	Music	Lyrics
1.	"Gobind Da Sardar"	Jazzy B	Millind Gaba	Ram Kala Sanghian
2.	"Raanjhana"	Geeta Jhala	Kaptan Laadi & RDK	Noddy Singh
3.	"Suit Punjabi"	Mika Singh	Millind Gaba	Millind Gaba
4	"Sardar Saab"	Kaptan Laadi	Kaptan Laadi & RDK	Noddy Singh
5	"Chhalla"	Kaptan Laadi	Kaptan Laadi & RDK	FOLK
6	"Nirbhau Nirvair"	Millind Gaba	Millind Gaba	Millind Gaba
7	"System"	Millind Gaba	Millind Gaba	Millind Gaba
8	"Gabru"	Kaptan Laadi	Kaptan Laadi & RDK	Noddy Singh
