= Mashooq =

2003 album by Kulwinder Dhillon

Studio album by Kulwinder Dhillon
- Released: 17 June 2003
- Recorded: 2001–2003
- Genre: Bhangra
- Language: Punjabi
- Label: Planet Recordz Inc
- Producer: Sukhpal Sukh

Kulwinder Dhillon chronology
Akhara	Mashooq	Jatt Driver Fauji

Mashooq is the fourth album released by Punjabi Bhangra artist Kulwinder Dhillon. The music on this album was produced by Sukhpal Sukh. The album was released in 2003.

== Track listing ==
1. Kachiye Zubaan Diye
2. Khair Nahi
3. Glassi
4. Mashooq
5. Pyar
6. Pardesi
7. Bootle
8. Juj Muhre
9. Pinki
10. Do Gallan
