= Gabhroo Punjab Da =

- Directed by: Jagjit Gill
- Starring: Gurdas Maan; Gugu Gill; Rama Vij
- Music by: Surinder Shinda Charanjit Ahuja
- Release date: 1986
- Country: India
- Language: Punjabi

Gabroo Punjab Da is a 1986 Indian Punjabi-language action film directed by Jagjit Gill. It was made after the success of Punjabi film Putt Jattan De, which became a trendsetter in Punjabi action movies. Gurdas Maan and Rama Vij played lead roles in this movie. Gugu Gill appeared as an actor for the first time in this movie, playing the villain, which was a milestone for his career.

== Star cast ==
- Gurdas Maan as Shera
- Guggu Gill as Jagroop 'Jaggu'
- Rekesh Pandey as Fauji Amar
- Rama Vij as Leelo
- Mehar Mittal
- Surinder Sharma as Kharku
- Manjit Maan as Reshma
- Sangita Mehta
- Didar Sandhu as himself
- Amar Noorie as herself

== See also ==
- List of Indian Punjabi films
