= Navaniat Singh =

Indian film director

Navaniat Singh is an Indian film director who works in Punjabi and Hindi cinema. Active since 2004, he is known for directing the Punjabi films Mel Karade Rabba (2010), Dharti (2011), Singh vs. Kaur (2013) and Rangeelay (2013).

== Filmography ==
Year	Title	Role
2004	Asa Nu Maan Watna Da	Chief assistant director
2006	Dil Apna Punjabi	Assistant director
2007	Mitti Wajaan Maardi	Assistant director
2009	Tera Mera Ki Rishta	Director
2010	Mel Karade Rabba	Director
2011	Dharti	Director
2012	Taur Mittran Di	Director
2013	Singh vs. Kaur	Director
2013	Rangeelay	Director
2014	Romeo Ranjha	Director
2017	Jindua	Director
2015	Shareek	Director
2018	Yamla Pagla Deewana: Phir Se	Director
2019	Singham	Director
2022	Shareek 2	Director
2024	Blackia 2	Director
2027	Noorani Chehra	Director
