= Jimmy Sheirgill =

Indian actor (born 1970)

Jimmy Shergill
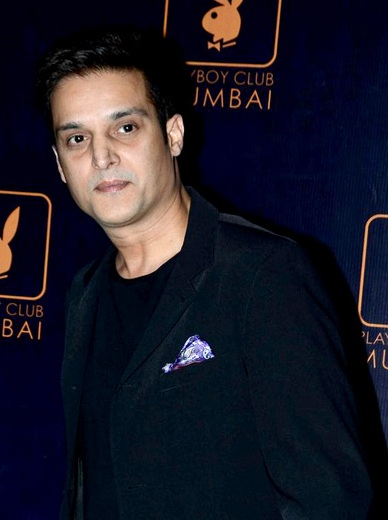
- Sheirgill in 2017
- Born: Jasjit Singh Gill; 3 December 1970 (age 55); Gorakhpur, Uttar Pradesh, India
- Other name: Jimmy Shergill
- Education: Punjabi University; St. Francis' College
- Occupations: Actor; producer
- Years active: 1996–present
- Spouse: Priyanka Puri (m. 2001)
- Children: 1

Jimmy Sheirgill (born Jasjit Singh Gill; 3 December 1970), also known as Jimmy Shergill, is an Indian actor and producer who primarily works in Hindi and Punjabi films.

Sheirgill began his film career with the 1996 thriller Maachis. His breakthrough came with the romantic drama Mohabbatein (2000), which became the highest-grossing Hindi film of the year, following which he starred in several films, including Mere Yaar Ki Shaadi Hai (2002), Munna Bhai M.B.B.S. (2003), Hum Tum (2004), A Wednesday! (2008), Saheb, Biwi Aur Gangster (2011), Tanu Weds Manu (2011), Special 26 (2013), Happy Bhag Jayegi (2016), De De Pyaar De (2019) and Hai Jawani Toh Ishq Hona Hai (2026). His highest-grossing releases came with supporting roles in the comedy-drama Lage Raho Munna Bhai (2006), the drama My Name Is Khan (2010) and the romantic comedy Tanu Weds Manu: Returns (2015). The latter earned him a nomination for the Filmfare Award for Best Supporting Actor.

Sheirgill made his Punjabi film debut with Yaaran Naal Baharan in 2005. His notable work in Punjabi cinema include Mel Karade Rabba (2010), Dharti (2011), Aa Gaye Munde UK De (2014), Shareek (2015) and Daana Paani (2018). He won the PTC Award for Best Actor for Mel Karade Rabba. The actor has also produced several Punjabi films.

== Early life ==
Sheirgill was born on 3 December 1970, into a Punjabi Sikh aristocratic Majithia family family. His paternal great aunt was the Indian artist of Hungarian-Jewish ancestry Amrita Sher-Gil, one of India’s most important women painters.

He studied at St. Francis' College, Lucknow for a few years and then moved to his ancestral home state of Punjab, in 1985. He studied at The Punjab Public School, Nabha and at Bikram College, Punjabi University, Patiala. He completed his graduation degree from Post Graduate Government College - 11, Chandigarh and Panjab University.

Sheirgill went to Mumbai after a cousin convinced him to try his luck in the film industry. There, he attended Roshan Taneja's acting classes.

== Career ==
=== Hindi films ===
Sheirgill started his acting career in 1996 with the critically acclaimed film Maachis, directed by Gulzar, based on the terrorism in Punjab. The film did reasonably well at the box office and got him noticed by all the top filmmakers in the industry, which led him to being cast in Aditya Chopra's Mohabbatein (2000) alongside stalwarts like Amitabh Bachchan, Shah Rukh Khan, and Aishwarya Rai. He has consistently won rave reviews for all his performances in films such as Mere Yaar Ki Shaadi Hai (2002), Dil Hai Tumhaara (2002), Haasil (2003), Munna Bhai M.B.B.S. (2003), Yahaan (2005), Lage Raho Munna Bhai (2006), Eklavya: The Royal Guard (2007), A Wednesday! (2008), My Name Is Khan (2010), Tanu Weds Manu (2011), Saheb, Biwi Aur Gangster (2011), Saheb, Biwi Aur Gangster Returns (2013), Special 26 (2013), Bullett Raja (2013), Fugly (2014) and Tanu Weds Manu: Returns (2015). He also worked with rising star of the time Amisha Patel in Yeh Zindagi Ka Safar (2001). He won the Star Guild Awards previously known as Apsara guild awards for Best Actor In A Supporting Role for a movie A Wednesday!

=== Punjabi films ===
He started acting in Punjabi films in 2005 with Manmohan Singh's Yaaran Naal Baharan, which did well at the box office. He went on to act in several other Punjabi films. He is currently one of the top actors in the industry, and some of the films he has acted in have been hits. He plans to produce and act in one Punjabi film every year, for which he has signed a deal with Bollywood production house Eros International. His first film as a producer, Dharti, released in 2011 and did well at the box office. The next production from his company was Taur Mittran Di, that was released in May 2012. He has lined up two more films for production; the multi-star cast Saadi Love Story, in which he's cast Diljit Dosanjh, Amrinder Gill, Neetu Singh, Surveen Chawla and himself in a cameo and another film titled Rangeelay, which casts him in the lead with Neha Dhupia.

== Personal life and other work ==
Sheirgill married his long time girlfriend Priyanka Puri in 2001. They have a son named Veer. Sheirgill changed the spelling of his surname "Shergill" to "Sheirgill" because the name Jimmy Shergill was already used on social media.

Sheirgill walked the ramp with underprivileged children for a charity fashion show in 2013. In 2014, he donated warm clothes for the homeless in North India. Sheirgill participated in the 6-hour telethon to raise funds to rebuild Kerala, which was devastated by floods in 2018.

== Media image ==
Sampada Sharma of Indian Express said that Sheirgill is the actor "who focused more on the characters he played rather than being the hero". Agnivo Niyogi of The Telegraph noted, "Jimmy Sheirgill is an actor so good that he owns every frame he's in, no matter how popular or seasoned his co-star is." Firstpost termed him as "one of the most versatile actors" and added that he is known for being "very choosy about his roles".

In an interview, Sheirgill said that he believes his "unconventional film choices" have worked in his favour as the audiences now associate him with good roles. He further added that it has also led to a lot of interesting work coming his way. Rediff.com placed him 7th in its "Best Actors" list of 2011. Sheirgill is a celebrity endorser for brands and products such as Ezeepay and Mahindra Verito. He has also being the brand ambassador of Punjab Premier League.

== Filmography ==
=== Hindi ===
Year	Title	Role	Notes	Ref(s).
1996	Maachis	Jaimal 'Jimmy' Singh		
1999	Jahan Tum Le Chalo	Aakash		
2000	Mohabbatein	Karan Choudhary		
2001	Yeh Zindagi Ka Safar	Jai Bharadwaj		
2002	Mere Yaar Ki Shaadi Hai	Rohit Khanna		
2002	Dil Hai Tumhaara	Sameer		
2002	Dil Vil Pyar Vyar	Hrithik Mittal		
2002	Kehtaa Hai Dil Baar Baar	Sunder Kapoor		
2003	Haasil	Aniruddha 'Ani' Sharma		
2003	Munna Bhai M.B.B.S.	Zaheer Ali Khan		
2004	Agnipankh	Siddharth Singh		
2004	Charas	Dev Anand		
2004	Hum Tum	Mihir Vora		
2005	Silsiilay	Tarun Ahuja		
2005	Yahaan	Captain Aman		
2006	Prateeksha	Dr. Kishen Lal		
2006	Umar	Shashank Dutt		
2006	Tom, Dick, and Harry	Harshvardhan "Harry"		
2006	Yun Hota Toh Kya Hota	Hemant Punj		
2006	Lage Raho Munna Bhai	Victor D'Souza		
2006	Bas Ek Pal	Rahul Kher		
2006	Rehguzar	Rahul Khanna		
2007	Eklavya: The Royal Guard	Prince Udaywardhan Rana		
2007	Delhii Heights	Abheer 'Abhi'		
2007	Raqeeb	Sunny Khanna		
2007	Victoria No. 203	Jimmy Joseph		
2007	Chhodon Naa Yaar	Ravi Prasad		
2007	Dus Kahaniyaan	Kabir	Anthology film; segment: High on the Highway	
2007	Strangers	Rahul		
2008	Hastey Hastey	Neel		
2008	A Wednesday!	Inspector Arif Khan		
2009	Bachelor Party	Rocky		
2009	Marega Salaa	Inspector Jai Kumar		
2010	My Name is Khan	Zakir Khan		
2010	A Flat	Rahul Verma		
2011	Tanu Weds Manu	Raja Awasthi		
2011	Game	Vikram Kapoor		
2011	Saheb, Biwi Aur Gangster	Aditya Pratap Singh (Saheb)		
2012	Dangerous Ishhq	ACP Bhargav Singh		
2013	Rajdhani Express	DCP Yadav		
2013	Special 26	SI Ranveer Singh		
2013	Saheb, Biwi Aur Gangster Returns	Aditya Pratap Singh (Saheb)		
2013	Four Two Ka One	Vijay Kumar		
2013	Bullett Raja	Rudra Tripathi		
2014	Fugly	Inspector R.S. Chautala		
2014	Darr @ The Mall	Vishnu Sharma/Arjun		
2014	Bang Bang!	Colonel Viren Nanda	Cameo appearance	
2015	Tanu Weds Manu: Returns	Raja Awasthi		
2015	Uvaa	S.P Tejaveer Singh		
2016	Shortcut Safari	Chief Jimmy		
2016	Traffic	Gurbir Singh		
2016	Shorgul	Ranjit Om		
2016	Madaari	Nachiket Verma		
2016	Happy Bhag Jayegi	Daman Singh Bagga		
2016	Yea Toh Two Much Ho Gayaa	Mann/Mohan		
2016	Dil Sala Sanki	Bachcha Babu		
2016	Mahayoddha Rama	Laxman	Voiceover	
2017	Shubh Mangal Saavdhan	Himself	Guest appearance	
2017	Ranchi Diaries	Jimmy Sheirgill, A Cop		
2018	Mukkabaaz	Bhagwandas Mishra		
2018	Veerey Ki Wedding	Balli Arora		
2018	Phamous	Radhe Shyam		
2018	Saheb, Biwi Aur Gangster 3	Aditya Pratap Singh (Saheb)		
2018	Happy Phirr Bhag Jayegi	Daman Singh Bagga		
2019	SP Chauhan	Thakur Satpal Chauhan		
2019	Gun Pe Done	Pancham		
2019	De De Pyaar De	Vakil 'VK' Kapoor		
2019	Family of Thakurganj	Nannu		
2019	Jhootha Kahin Ka	Tommy Pandey		
2019	Judgementall Hai Kya	Sridhar Awasthi		
2019	P Se Pyaar F Se Faraar	Rajveer Singh		
2019	Pati Patni Aur Woh	Narrator	Voiceover	
2021	Collar Bomb	Manoj Hesi		
2022	Double XL	Atul Chhabra	Special appearance	
2023	Operation Mayfair	Detective Amar Singh		
2023	Aazam	Javed		
2024	Auron Mein Kahan Dum Tha	Abhijeet		
2024	Phir Aayi Hasseen Dillruba	Mrityunjay "Monty" Tripathi		
2024	Khel Khel Mein	Unnamed	Voice over	
2024	Sikandar Ka Muqaddar	Jaswinder Singh		
2026	Magical Wallet	Rajveer		
2026	Hai Jawani Toh Ishq Hona Hai	Jogi Randhawa		

=== Punjabi ===
Year	Title	Role	Notes	Ref(s).
2005	Yaaran Naal Baharan	Navdeep Singh Brar / Deep		
2006	Mannat	Nihal Singh		
2009	Tera Mera Ki Rishta	Meet		
2009	Munde U.K. De	Roop Singh		
2010	Mel Karade Rabba	Rajveer Gill		
2011	Dharti	Jasdeep Singh Wadala / Jay Singh	Also producer	
2013	Saadi Love Story	Rajveer	Also producer; Cameo appearance	
2013	Rangeelay	Sunny/Bobby	Also producer	
2014	Aa Gaye Munde UK De	Roop Singh		
2015	Hero Naam Yaad Rakhi	Hero		
2015	Shareek	Jassa / Zorawar		
2016	Vaisakhi List	Jarnail Singh		
2017	Jindua	Karamjeet Singh / Karma		
2018	Daana Paani	Mehtab Singh		
2022	Shareek 2	Jaswant Singh Randhawa / Fateh Singh Randhawa		
2023	Tu Hovein Main Hovan	Garry Malwani		
2025	Maa Jaye	Amar		

=== As producer ===
Year	Title	Notes	Ref(s).
2011	Dharti	Under Jimmy Sheirgill Productions	
2012	Taur Mittran Di	Under Jimmy Sheirgill Productions	
2013	Saadi Love Story	Under Jimmy Sheirgill Productions	
2013	Rangeelay	Under Jimmy Sheirgill Productions	

=== Television ===
Year	Title	Role	Notes	Ref(s).
2010	Aahat	Himself	Season 5 Episode 69	
2014	CID	Vishnu Sharma	Season 1 Episode 1046	
2019	Rangbaaz Phirse	Amar Pal Singh	Season 2	
2020–present	Your Honor	Judge Bishan Khosla	2 seasons	
2022	Bandon Mein Tha Dum	Narrator	Documentary series	
2023	Choona	Avinash Shukla	Netflix series	
2024	Ranneeti: Balakot & Beyond	Kashyap Sinha	JioCinema	
2026	Operation Safed Sagar	Wing Commander Birender Singh Dhanoa	Netflix	

== Awards and nominations ==
Year	Award	Category	Work	Result	Ref.
2013	BIG Star Entertainment Awards	Most Entertaining Actor in a Thriller Film	Saheb, Biwi Aur Gangster Returns	Won	
2016	Filmfare Awards	Best Supporting Actor	Tanu Weds Manu Returns	Nominated	
2017	Filmfare Awards Punjabi	Best Actor	Vaisakhi List	Nominated	
2018	Filmfare Awards Punjabi	Best Actor	Jindua	Nominated	
2018	Filmfare Awards Punjabi	Best Actor - Critics	Jindua	Nominated	
2022	Indian Television Academy Awards	Popular Actor - OTT	Your Honor	Nominated	
2017	International Indian Film Academy Awards	Best Comedian	Happy Bhag Jayegi	Nominated	
2009	Producers Guild Film Awards	Best Actor in a Supporting Role	A Wednesday!	Won	
2014	Producers Guild Film Awards	Best Actor in a Negative Role	Saheb, Biwi Aur Gangster Returns	Nominated	
2011	PTC Punjabi Film Awards	Best Actor	Mel Karade Rabba	Won	
2012	PTC Punjabi Film Awards	Best Actor	Dharti	Nominated	
2014	PTC Punjabi Film Awards	Best Actor	Rangeelay	Nominated	
2015	PTC Punjabi Film Awards	Best Actor	Aa Gaye Munde UK De	Nominated	
2016	PTC Punjabi Film Awards	Best Actor	Shareek	Nominated	
2018	PTC Punjabi Film Awards	Best Actor	Jindua	Nominated	
2019	PTC Punjabi Film Awards	Best Actor	Daana Paani	Nominated	
2009	Screen Awards	Best Supporting Actor	A Wednesday!	Nominated	
2012	Screen Awards	Best Villain	Saheb, Biwi Aur Gangster	Nominated	
2014	Screen Awards	Best Supporting Actor	Bullett Raja	Nominated	
2017	Screen Awards	Best Comedian	Happy Bhag Jayegi	Nominated	
2012	Stardust Awards	Best Actor	Saheb, Biwi Aur Gangster	Nominated	
2012	Zee Cine Awards	Best Actor in a Negative Role	Saheb, Biwi Aur Gangster	Nominated	
2017	Zee Cine Awards	Best Actor in a Comic Role	Happy Bhaag Jayegi	Nominated	
2019	Zee Cine Awards	Best Actor in a Comic Role	Happy Phirr Bhag Jayegi	Nominated	
2019	Zee Cine Awards	Best Actor in a Negative Role	Mukkabaaz	Nominated	
2008	V. Shantaram Awards	Best Supporting Actor	A Wednesday!	Won	
2011	Punjabi International Film Academy Awards	Best Actor	Mel Karade Rabba	Won	
2012	Punjabi International Film Academy Awards	Best Actor	Dharti	Won	
2014	Punjabi International Film Academy Awards	Best Actor	Rangeelay	Nominated	
2015	Punjabi International Film Academy Awards	Best Actor	Aa Gaye Munde UK De	Nominated	
2016	Punjabi International Film Academy Awards	Best Actor	Shareek	Won	
2018	Punjabi International Film Academy Awards	Best Actor	Jindua	Won	
2023	Punjabi International Film Academy Awards	Best Actor	Shareek 2	Won	
