= Dharti (2011 film) =

- Directed by: Navaniat Singh
- Produced by: Darshan Singh Grewal; J.S.Kataria; Jimmy Sheirgill
- Starring: Jimmy Sheirgill; Surveen Chawla; Rannvijay Singh; Japji Khera
- Cinematography: Harmeet Singh
- Edited by: Manish More
- Music by: Anjan Biswas
- Distributed by: T-Series
- Release dates: 21 April 2011 (Australia); 22 April 2011 (worldwide)
- Country: India
- Language: Punjabi
- Budget: ₹30 million (US$350,000)
- Box office: ₹87.8 million (US$1.0 million)

Dharti is a 2011 Indian Punjabi political suspense thriller film directed by Navaniat Singh with story, screenplay and dialogues by Manoj Jha. Dharti was produced by Darshan Singh Grewal, J.S. Kataria and Jimmy Sheirgill, and stars Jimmy Sheirgill, Surveen Chawla, Rannvijay Singh, Japji Khera, Prem Chopra, Rahul Dev, Binnu Dhillon and Shavinder Mahal. It was released on 21 April in Australia and on 22 April 2011 globally. The film was to be made in Hindi but, on much insistence of Shergill, the producers and the directors agreed to make it in Punjabi.

== Plot ==
The story opens with a headline on a news channel with the breaking news that the CM of Punjab, Gurdial Singh, has been hospitalized with a major heart attack. Using this reason, other political parties are trying to bring down the present government of P.S.D. (Punjab Sewa Dal). For this, Baljit Singh Wadala (Prem Chopra) president of P.S.D. is holding a rally to meet the people. He assures them that soon conditions will return to normal and that their party is always ready to serve people of Punjab. Soon after this he goes to hospital to meet CM who asks him to occupy the vacant seat of Chief Minister which he refuses. Outside the hospital, journalists question another member of the party, Baldev Singh (Shivender Mahal), regarding the party's next decision. He says that whatever the decision taken by the party will be for the welfare of the people of Punjab.

Then comes Nachhattar Singh (Rahul Dev) who is one of the most popular politicians of the party with Babbar (Binnu Dhillon), another member and right-hand of Nachhattar followed by the introduction of Vikramjit Singh Wadala: son of Baljit Singh Wadala and a party member. Then comes Squadron Leader J Singh, Jasdeep Singh Wadala (Jimmy Sheirgill) a short-tempered ace Air Force pilot whose love interest is Baani (Surveen Chawla) daughter of his Senior.

Baljit Singh announces that till the CM recovers a Deputy CM would be made to run the government. This person would be the next CM candidate for the next elections. Then comes Heera Singh (Rannvijay Singh), a student union leader who is a very close friend of Nachhattar Singh. His love interest is Suhani (Japji Khaira). Nachhattar Singh expects that he will be the Deputy CM.

Jasdeep Singh is ordered to go to Punjab for the promotion of the Air Force university. It is revealed that Jasdeep is not in good terms with his father, Baljit Singh Wadala, as Jasdeep had to leave the house to join the Air Force. He swore not step in the house ever when his father, who was ready to establish him as a powerful candidate of P.S.D. as he wanted him to join politics. The father-son relationship is bitter.

The media creates tension for who would be the Deputy CM. Vikramjit Singh Wadala is announced as the Deputy CM against the expectation of Nachhattar. Nachhattar leaves the party on being suggested for doing the same by Batra, a businessman. Nachhatar was in thirst of power and said whoever would come between him and CM's seat would meet death. Heera Singh feels that Nachhatar should not have such an attitude.

Brothers Jasdeep and Vikramjit meet after a long time. After a few days, on the birthday of Jasdeep, Vikram greets him, gives him a gift, and asks him to forget everything and to apologise to their father. Jasdeep asks him to have a party at night with him. During the night Jasdeep picks up Vikram from a spot and Vikramjit accompanied him without security cover. Jasdeep asks him whether their father knows that he has come to meet him or not. Jasdeep learns that only Vikram's wife Prabhjot and Baldev know that Vikram is out and that their father does not know that Jasdeep is here. Jasdeep agrees to apologise to his father for sake of his brother.

A car crashes into Vikram who is killed in this accident. After Vikram's death, the father-son rivalry deepens. Jasdeep meets Nachhattar to convince him to rejoin the party and not leave his father in such a condition. Hopefully he would be made Deputy CM. Nacchhatar rejoins party and apologises to Baljit Singh. Next Jasdeep learns from Batra and Heera that Nacchhatar got Vikram killed in the car accident.

Jasdeep returns home and apologises his father. His father agrees and forgives him. Jasdeep tells Baldev about Nacchhatar's killing of Vikram. Baldev said that he is with Jasdeep and will take care of everything, that intelligence would solve the matter, and that the perpetrator would be caught soon. Babbar tells same thing to Jasdeep that Nachhattar got Vikram killed and that he is organising a rally in memory of Vikram. Jasdeep tells this to Baldev who asks him to go to the rally with Nachhattar and to look into the matter. Jasdeep and Nachhattar go to the rally in the same car. At the rally Babbar gets a call and he hurriedly runs toward Nachhattar to protect him from a shot. A stampede occurs and all politicians are taken to cars by security. This time Jasdeep does not accompany Nachhatar. The media becomes active. Nachhatar becomes the breaking news on every news channel.

At the same time, a bomb blast occurs and Nachhatar is killed. Jasdeep goes to meet Babbar who was hospitalised due to injury where he learns that Babbar 'lied' him about Nachhatar's involvement in Vikram's accident. And that Batra forced him to tell this to him. Jasdeep rushes to meet Batra whose men attack Jasdeep. Jasdeep asks Batra who got Nachhatar killed: Batra said that he is the same person who got Vikram killed and that the person is from his own home. Jasdeep shares everything with his father, Baljit, who tells him that in politics it never is what it seems so he should be careful.

Jasdeep takes Baldev with him to an empty ground and narrates the story as a tale of a 'king'. The truth comes out that it was Baldev behind all incidents, i.e., he was the mastermind behind this story. It was all revenge for not getting the power of Deputy CM since he had been loyal to this party for 20 years. Followed by arguments, Jasdeep drags Baldev into the car and drives very fast. Eventually an accident occurs. The scene concludes with the death of Baldev and media reports which stated that the accident occurred due to fog. Jasdeep has been minorly injured. Jasdeep takes over P.S.D. as its new president followed by joining of youngsters including Heera Singh.

== Cast ==
- Jimmy Sheirgill as Jasdeep Singh Wadala a.k.a. squadron leader J. Singh
- Surveen Chawla as Bani
- Rannvijay Singh as Heera Singh
- Rahul Dev as Nachattar Singh Virk
- Prem Chopra as Baljit Singh Wadala
- Binnu Dhillon as Babbar Singh
- Randeep Arya as Vikramjit Singh Wadala
- Japji Khaira as Suniana
- Shavinder Mahal as Baldev Singh
- Jaspal Bhatti as AVM Sandhu (Bani's father/Jay Singh's boss)
- Savita Bhatti as Mr. Bhatti's wife
- Harpal Singh as Politician from New Delhi
- Gippy Grewal in special appearance in song "Sarkaran"
- Ranjit in special appearance as Punjabi seva Dal CM Gurdial Singh

== Soundtrack ==
Dharti

Soundtrack album by Jaidev Kumar
- Released: 9 April 2011
- Genre: Feature film soundtrack
- Length: 25:53
- Language: Punjabi
- Label: T-Series

The soundtrack album of Dharti consists of 7 songs composed by Jaidev Kumar.

Tracklist
No.	Title	Lyrics	Singer(s)	Length
1.	"Gaddi Moudan Ge"	Kumaar	Mika Singh	04:20
2.	"Bandiya Tu"	Jaggi Singh	Rabbi Shergill	04:20
3.	"Dharti"	Jaggi Singh	Jaggi Singh	03:36
4.	"Warrant"	Tejpal Mizaj	Diljit Dosanjh	04:41
5.	"Sarkaaran"	Veet Baljit	Gippy Grewal	04:05
6.	"Sura So Pehchaniye"		Arvinder Singh	02:26
7.	"Deh Shiva Bar Mohe Ehai"		Arvinder Singh	02:16
Total length:				25:53

== Release ==
Dharti released on 21 April 2011 in Australia. It released worldwide on 22 April 2011. The premiere took place in Australia.

Dharti beat the record of the other two movies that were released on same day: Dum Maro Dum (Hindi) and Mr. Perfect (Telugu) in Punjab and overseas. At the Wave multiplex in Ludhiana, the first two shows of Dharti were Rs. 21,963 and Rs. 35,824. At Orient in Ludhiana, Dharti drew the first two shows full (Rs. 25,100 per show); at PVR in Ludhiana, it collected Rs. 31,203 in the first show. At Harsha multiplex in Karnal Dharti collected Rs. 10,086 in its first show.

On its first weekend playing in the United States, Dharti grossed an estimated $148,000 from 11 screens which was an average of $8,230 grossed at each screen. The only movies to do better were Mr. Perfect which grossed an average of $8860 per screen and Madea's Big Happy Family which grossed a huge $11,220 per screen. This converts to approximately 6.6 million INR.

== Awards and nominates ==
Dharti won six awards at the PTC Punjabi Film Awards ceremony:

Award	Recipient(s) and nominee(s)	Category	Result
PTC Punjabi Film Award		Critics Award for Best Film	Won
PTC Punjabi Film Award	Rannvijay Singha	Best Debut Male	Won
PTC Punjabi Film Award	Surveen Chawla	Dove Best Debut Female	Won
PTC Punjabi Film Award	Navaniat Singh	Critics Award for Best Director	Won
PTC Punjabi Film Award	Harmeet Singh	Best Cinematography	Won
PTC Punjabi Film Award	Anjan Viswas	Best Background Score	Won
