= Jindua =

- Theatrical release poster
- Directed by: Navaniat Singh
- Written by: Dheeraj Rattan
- Screenplay by: Dheeraj Rattan
- Produced by: Gursimran Dhillon; Harsimran Dhillon; Virk Ohri
- Starring: Jimmy Sheirgill; Neeru Bajwa; Sargun Mehta
- Cinematography: Harmeet Singh
- Edited by: Manish More
- Music by: Jaidev Kumar
- Production companies: Ohri Productions; Infantry Pictures
- Release date: 17 March 2017
- Running time: 136 minutes
- Countries: India; Canada
- Language: Punjabi

Jindua is a romantic drama film directed by Navaniat Singh starring Jimmy Sheirgill, Neeru Bajwa and Sargun Mehta in the lead roles. It was released on 17 March 2017.

== Plot ==
The movie is set initially in Calgary, Canada, where Karma (Jimmy Sheirgill) and Debu (Rajiv Thakur) are illegal immigrants working at a construction site. Karma was sent to Canada by his parents who only wanted him to make a lot of money. Tired of the poor living situation as an illegal immigrant, Karma desires for Canadian citizenship. Debu has a girlfriend Nimmi (Sonia Dhillon) in Punjab, India. Debu keeps a Golden Retriever named Dabbu and likes it very much.

Ish is a Punjabi Canadian, daughter of a naturalized Canadian citizen from Punjab. Ish is enthusiastic about music and wants to be a rock singer, while her parents only want to get her married to a Punjabi boy, for which they have always been arguing.

One day, immigration officers raid Debu and Karma's house. Debu is arrested while Karma manages to escape with Dabbu. After that, Debu is kept in detention center waiting for trials, and Karma sends a Punjabi lawyer Harjap Singh Bhangal (Harjap Singh Bhangal) to help him. The lawyer cannot make Debu immediately released, but offers a place for Karma to live temporarily. At his temporary house, Karma meets Saggi (Sargun Mehta), a Punjabi student in Canada, and the two fall in love later.

To pressure his daughter, Ish's father tells her that if she does not marry a Punjabi boy, he will donate all his wealth to charity organization, without any single dollar left for her. Ish comes up with idea to fake a marriage with a Punjabi boy so that she can get her father's wealth. She asks help from Harjap Singh Bhangal, Debu's lawyer, whom her family have known for long.

Harjap takes the fake wedding proposal to Karma, whom he knows desires for Canadian citizenship. Despite having a girlfriend, Karma agrees to the proposal as he knows it could be a rare chance for him to legalize his status in Canada, and he will be able to settle down in Canada with his girlfriend Saggi. He marries Ish, without the knowledge of Saggi. Apart from Ish and Karma, only Harjap knows their marriage, though legal, is a fake marriage.

After some days, Karma confesses to Saggi about the fake marriage. Upset Saggi leaves Karma without listening to his further explanation. Meanwhile, Ish is betrayed by her band and get heartbroken. After Karma takes care of her during that, she falls in love with Karma.

After some time, Saggi graduates, and decides to return to India immediately. Before leaving, her roommate persuades her to listen to Karma's explanation for once, and she agrees. Saggi visits Karma and Ish's house, while Karma is not home. Ish, who doesn't know Saggi is Karma's girlfriend, tells Saggi that though she married Karma in a fake marriage, but fell in love with him later. Saggis gives up, and leaves Karma's house without meeting him and returns to India. After Karma returns home, he gets to know Saggi was there before but left without seeing him. Karma tries to contact Saggi, but fails, as Saggi already changes her number.

Karma is later qualified for Canadian citizenship. But at the Citizenship Ceremony, he refuses to accept it as he realizes the reason he wanted the citizenship for is no longer here, and he wants Saggi more than Canadian citizenship. He tells it to Ish, and Ish persuades him to go to India to look for Saggi, though she loves him also.

Karma leaves everything and returns to India, and finds Saggi who is about to be engaged. Saggi's brother, her only family member, accepts Karma. Karma and Saggi finally make it.

== Cast ==
- Jimmy Sheirgill as Karamjeet Singh
- Neeru Bajwa as Ishh
- Sargun Mehta as Saggi
- Rajiv Thakur
- Sonia Dhillon Tully as Nimmi
- Balinder Johal

== Awards and nominations ==
Award	Date of ceremony (Note: Date is linked to the article about the awards held that year, wherever possible.)	Category	Recipient	Result
Filmfare Awards Punjabi	23 March 2018	Best Actor	Jimmy Sheirgill	Nominated
Filmfare Awards Punjabi	23 March 2018	Best Actor Critics	Jimmy Sheirgill	Nominated
Filmfare Awards Punjabi	23 March 2018	Best Actress	Neeru Bajwa	Nominated
Filmfare Awards Punjabi	23 March 2018	Best Actress Critics	Neeru Bajwa	Nominated
Filmfare Awards Punjabi	23 March 2018	Best Director	Navaniat Singh	Nominated
Filmfare Awards Punjabi	23 March 2018	Best Actor in supporting role	Rajiv Thakur	Nominated
Filmfare Awards Punjabi	23 March 2018	Best Music Album	Jaidev Kumar & Arjunaa Harjai	Nominated
Filmfare Awards Punjabi	23 March 2018	Best Lyrics	Kumaar	Nominated
Filmfare Awards Punjabi	23 March 2018	Best playback singer(female)	Jasmine Sandlas	Nominated
Filmfare Awards Punjabi	23 March 2018	Best Sound Design	Anand Pawar	Nominated
Filmfare Awards Punjabi	23 March 2018	Best Background Score	Raju Singh	Nominated
Filmfare Awards Punjabi	23 March 2018	Best Cinematography	Harmeet Singh	Nominated
PTC Punjabi Film Awards	30 March 2018	Best Film	Jindua	Nominated
PTC Punjabi Film Awards	30 March 2018	Best Actor	Jimmy Sheirgill	Nominated
PTC Punjabi Film Awards	30 March 2018	Best Actress	Neeru Bajwa	Nominated
PTC Punjabi Film Awards	30 March 2018	Best Director	Navaniat Singh	Nominated
PTC Punjabi Film Awards	30 March 2018	Most Popular Song	Jindua	Nominated
PTC Punjabi Film Awards	30 March 2018	Best Playback Singer	Jasmine Sandlas	Nominated
PTC Punjabi Film Awards	30 March 2018	Best Music Director	Jaidev Kumar	Nominated
PTC Punjabi Film Awards	30 March 2018	Best Lyricist	Kumaar	Nominated
PTC Punjabi Film Awards	30 March 2018	Best Dialogues	Balraj Syal & Amarjeet Singh	Nominated
PTC Punjabi Film Awards	30 March 2018	Best Story	Dheeraj Rattan	Nominated
PTC Punjabi Film Awards	30 March 2018	Best Cinematography	Harmeet Singh	Won
PTC Punjabi Film Awards	30 March 2018	Best Background Score	Raju Singh	Nominated
