= Velli (album) =

2005 album by Kulwinder Dhillon

Studio album by Kulwinder Dhillon
- Released: 2005
- Recorded: Between 2004 & 2005
- Genre: Bhangra
- Label: Finetone
- Producer: Balvir Boparai

Kulwinder Dhillon chronology
Jatt Driver Fauji	Velli

Velli is the sixth and last album released by Punjabi Bhangra artist Kulwinder Dhillon before his death in a car accident on 19 March 2006.

== Track listing ==
1. Gaddi
2. Hikk De Jor
3. Meharbani
4. Pailli
5. Saal Solwan
6. Sup Ranga
7. Tera Pyar
8. Velli
