= Mahni Khera =

Mahni Khera is a village in North India's state of Punjab, in Sri Muktsar Sahib district. The majority of the residents are Sikh and of a variety of castes.

== Etymology ==
Mahni Khera was named after the Muslim leader of the village, Muhammad Mahni Khan.

== Partition ==
After the partition of Pakistan and India in 1947, Muslims left the village. Muslims were evidently not persecuted there at the time, but nearby villages were attacked, and Muslims left the village in response.

== Surnames ==
People of different surnames live there; the main surnames are Dhillon, Sekhon, Gill, Hari, Brar, Sandhu, Punia and Sidhu. The majority of the people of Mahnikhera are Jatt and Sikh, as well as the people who migrated from Pakistan during the partition of 1947. Many of the residents of Mahni Khera had to leave their village in 1947, but they still live in the hearts of old villagers.

== Demographics ==
According to the 1991 census, the total population of the village was 1,648.

== Economy ==
The village has the Ambu Ki Chaki flour mill. The quality of the "Atta" (wheat flour) is exceptional.

== Notables ==
- Punjwood horse rider Gurkirat sidhu is a resident.

Gurkirat sidhu Gurkirat sidhu – Punjabi horse competitions such as mahnikhera horse club.

== Location ==
Mahni Khera is located 18 km from Malout and 48 km from Sri Muktsar Sahib city. It is located in development block Lambi. Nearby villages are Sham Khera, Bhai ka Kera, Baloch Kera, Burj Sidhwan, Bahadhur Khera, Gaddandob, Ratta Kheraand Sitogunno.

== Gurudwara ==
The village has one newly built Gurudwara sahib. The earlier Gurdwara sahib was in an old mosque. After partition no Muslim family remained, so the facility was converted. A panj peer is near this village.

== Education ==
The village has one middle school "Govt middle school, Mahni Khera". The closest senior secondary school is in Sham Khera. One private school is available.

== Popular culture ==
horse racing Horse fair, Arebia chaal competition, were held in Mahni Khera.
