= Kulwinder Dhillon =

- Born: 6 June 1974; Sri Ganganagar, Rajasthan, India
- Origin: Pandori Ladha Singh, Hoshiarpur, Punjab, India
- Died: 19 March 2006 (age 32) Nawanshahr District, Punjab, India
- Genres: Punjabi; Bhangra
- Occupations: Singer-songwriter actor musician
- Years active: 1998–2006

Kulwinder Dhillon (6 June 1974 – 19 March 2006) was an Indian Punjabi singer, who had the hit songs like "Kacherian Ch Mele Lagday" and "Boliyan".

== Career ==
Kulwinder Dhillon started his career with his debut album Kacheriyan Ch Mele Lagde which contained the hit song "Boliyan". In 2002, he released his album, Glassi Khadke, which included the popular song Mashooq. Dhillon made his career with his third album, College, in 2003. The most popular song on the album was "Kalli Kite Mil". Though this was not a fast-paced tune, the album was redone later for an international release and the song was converted to a hardcore Bhangra, fast-paced song.

"Kalli Kite Mil Kujh Kahengi Ta Nahi" made Dhillon widely popular. He later released Velli in 2005. The album was enjoyed internationally and nothing had to be changed to appeal to the international crowd. The album Velli is believed to have sold over four hundred thousand copies worldwide. Most of the lyrics he sang for the albums were by Balvir Boparai, who is famous for his album Hostel. He also released another album, Jatt Driver Fauji, which contained some of his new and some popular tracks.

== Death ==
He died in a road accident on the Phagwara-Banga road, near Behram village, on 19 March 2006. According to sources, the accident occurred when the Honda City by which Dhillon and his friend Baljinder Billa were travelling, went out of control and collided against a roadside tree.

Kulwinder Dhillon had just released an album titled Akhara. His other albums are "Gareeba Ne Ki Pyar Karna," "Teri Tasveer," "Viah De Vajey" and several Dharmik albums. He has left behind a wife Gurpreet Kaur and son Armaan Dhillon.

== Discography ==
- Teri Tasveer (1998)
- Viah De Vajey
- Kacheriyan Ch Mele Lagde (2001)
- Glassi Khadke (2002)
- Akhara (2002)
- College (2003)
- Velli (2005)
- Glassy (The Triple Trencer 5000) (2011)
