= Mel Karade Rabba =

2010 film by Navaniat Singh

- Official film poster
- Directed by: Navaniat Singh
- Screenplay by: Dheeraj Rattan
- Produced by: Navaniat Singh; Rajan Batra
- Starring: Jimmy Sheirgill; Neeru Bajwa; Gippy Grewal; Jaswinder Bhalla
- Music by: Jaidev Kumar; Aman Hayer
- Distributed by: Tips Films
- Release date: 16 July 2010
- Country: India
- Language: Punjabi
- Box office: ₹ 105.0 million

Mel Karade Rabba is a 2010 Indian Punjabi-language film directed by Navaniat Singh and written by Dheeraj Rattan. It was produced by Rajan Batra and Vivek Ohri. It stars Jimmy Sheirgill and Neeru Bajwa. Pop singer Gippy Grewal made his acting debut with the film. Amar Noorie, Sunita Dhir and Shavinder Mahal also make appearances.

The film was theatrically released on 16 July 2010.

== Plot ==
Rajveer and Nihal are college enemies. One day Rajveer was beating up one of Nihal's friends. There he sees Seerat. Rajveer's father is a martyred soldier. His mother is proud of the awards and trophies that her son gets and he has told his family that he is a topper. However, the topper is Rajveer Dhillon. Rajveer Gill replaces Dhillon with Gill but she doesn't know that they are all fake. One day Rajveer gets the alliance of Seerat. At first he doesn't agree, but after seeing her picture, he agrees. When his family and Rajveer go see Seerat, Seerat remembers that Rajveer is a thug and she disagrees. But, Rajveer lies that he was trying to break up the fight. After hearing this, both families accept the alliance. Rajvir starts to follow Seerat everywhere and this makes Seerat annoyed. She makes a plan and calls Rajveer to a date for coffee. There she tells him that she's had an affair with many boys. After hearing this, Rajveer is shocked, but his friend tells him that she went to an all girl school. Rajveer calls Seerat on a date and tells her that he has also dated many girls, which irks Seerat. Then she hatches another plan. Her grandmother calls Seerat's father and tell him that she wants to meet the boy. Seerat and Rajveer go to her grandmother's house. During the two days, Rajveer wins the hearts of Seerat and her grandmother. But Seerat's dad finds out that Rajveer is not a topper, but a flunker. Learning the truth about Rajvir, Seerat's father tells Rajveer that he should break his daughter' heart. A heartbroken Rajveer breaks Seerat's heart. Seerat's father decided to get Seerat married to Nihal. She agrees. Rajvir tells his mother that he is not a topper. This breaks her heart, but later is forgiven. She gives Seerat a suit that she was supposed to wear on her wedding with Rajveer. There she tells Seerat that Rajveer broke her heart because her father told him to. Nihal decided to become friends with Rajveer, but this is just a misunderstanding. He gives Rajveer the wedding card. Nihal tells him that he shouldn't come to his wedding. A day before Seerat and Nihal's wedding, Seerat tells him that she can never love him because a person can only fall in love once. She says that she fell in love with Rajveer. Hearing this, Nihal tells Rajveer that Seerat still loves him. He dares him to come to his wedding and fight for his love. Rajveer goes to the wedding and fights. He gets injured, but he still fights on. Eventually Seerat's parents give their blessings to the both of them and Rajveer takes Seerat with him. In the ending we see Rajveer Dhillon. He has also stated to have a hockey with him like Rajveer Gill and Rajveer Dhillon had started to get respected in college.

== Cast ==
- Jimmy Sheirgill as Rajveer Gill
- Neeru Bajwa as Seerat Randhawa
- Gippy Grewal as Nihal Dhasah
- Jaswinder Bhalla as Rajveer's Uncle
- Amar Noorie as Seerat's Aunt
- Dolly Mattoo as Rajveer's mother
- Shivender Mahal as Sukhdev Randhawa, Seerat's father
- Sunita Dheer as Seerat's mother.
- Bhotu Shah as Rana, Rajveer's friend
- Diljit Dosanjh as Rajveer Dhillon (Guest appearance)
- Binnu Dhillon as Taari (Cameo)

== Release ==
Mel Karade Rabba released on 16 July 2010 in India, Australia, Canada, UK, NZ and USA across 50 screens.

=== Box office ===
The film collected Rs 19.5 million. in Punjab in its opening week. It went on to gross Rs 105.0 million.

== Awards ==
At the first PTC Punjabi Film Awards Mel Karade Rabba won the following:

- Won – Best Movie: Rajan Batra
- Won – Best Actor: Jimmy Sheirgill
- Won – Best Music Director: Jaidev Kumar
- Won – Critics Best Actress: Neeru Bajwa
- Won – Best Screenplay & Dialogue: Dheeraj Rattan
- Nominated – Best Debut Male: Gippy Grewal
- Nominated – Best Villain: Gippy Grewal
- Nominated – Best Actress: Neeru Bajwa
- Nominated – Best Director: Navniant Singh

== Soundtrack ==
Track	Song	Artist(s)	Composer	Lyricis
01	"Sher Ban Ke"	Gippy Grewal	Aman Hayer	S. L. Sadhpuri
02	"Punjabi Munde"	Diljit Dosanjh, Kamla Punjabi, Deep Cold	Jaidev Kumar	Jaggi Singh, Kamla Punjabi
03	"Dil Ka Karaar"	Feroz Khan	Jaidev Kumar	Jaggi Singh
04	"Rona Chadita – Mahi Mahi"	Atif Aslam	Jaidev Kumar	Kashmir Thakarwal
05	"Balle Balle"	Feroz Khan, Master Saleem, Sarabjit Kaur, Ruby Khan, Renu	Jaidev Kumar	Jaggi Singh
06	"Mel Karade Rabba"	Jasbir Jassi (alaap by Balbir Beera)	Jaidev Kumar	S. M. Saadiq
07	"Mahi Mahi"	Feroz Khan	Jaidev Kumar	Kashmir Thakarwal
08	"Dil Wali Kothi"	Master Saleem	Jaidev Kumar	Kumaar
09	"Dil Wali Kothi" [Remix]	Master Saleem	Jaidev Kumar (remixed by DJ Suketu)	Kumaar
10	"Punjabi Munde" [Remix]	Diljit Dosanjh, Kamla Punjabi, Deep Cold	Jaidev Kumar (remixed by DJ Shadow Dubai)	Jaggi Singh, Kamla Punjabi
