= Pseudo: Blood of Our Own =

- Directed by: Gursimran Dhillon
- Story by: Gursimran Dhillon
- Produced by: Harsimran Dhillon
- Starring: Naresh K Manwinder Gill; TayShawn Prinse; Paul Grewal; Thi Vo; Zarif Alibhai
- Cinematography: Bradley Stuckel
- Edited by: Gursimran Dhillon
- Music by: Mandeep Dhaliwal
- Distributed by: Canadian Bollywood Films
- Release date: 13 April 2012
- Running time: 105 minutes
- Country: Canada
- Language: English

Pseudo: Blood of Our Own is a 2012 Canadian action film written and directed by Gursimran Dhillon in his directorial debut. The movie was produced by Harsimran Dhillon under the banner of Canadian Bollywood Films. The movie stars Manwinder Gill, Tayshawn Prinse, Thi Vo, Zarif Alibhai and Naresh Kumar, in his feature film debut. The film was released on 13 April 2012 across Canada in Empire Theatres and in the US in Reliance Big Cinema's. It was released on DVD worldwide on 30 Aug 2012. The film was well received by audiences, and was nominated for Best Dramatic Feature Film at the 2013 Alberta Film and Television Awards. The movie was shot on location in Calgary, Alberta in "bitter cold" conditions.

== Plot ==
In a city where streets are overrun by drug dealers, those who have sworn to uphold the law are breaking it to better suit their own needs. Four friends Cheema, Jamal, Johnny and Juggy who are high school friends only have one thing in mind (Fast Money). They all get into the drug trafficking industry for different reasons but a common goal - get rich fast. Helped by a friend, a cop nicknamed Sleaze, an officer whose methods of enforcing the law are questionable, they co-ordinate a series of raids against known drug dealers and steal from them. But when money and power is involved it doesn't take much to turn on each other. When it becomes clear to both the drug boss and Sleaze's hit squad that everyone is playing a dark game of lies and deceit, everyone suddenly feels himself in danger of being caught and exposed to the enemy and is in a race to uncover the true intention of the other man in time to save himself. But will either of them be willing to turn on friends and comrades they've made during their long years? 'Pseudo' follows Sleaze as he takes the law into his own hands and the power of money becomes obvious and the loyalty and trust among friends is put to test.

== Cast ==
- Manwinder Gill as Cheema
- Tayshwan Prinse as Jamal
- Thi Vo as Johnny
- Zarif Alibhai as Juggi
- Naresh Kumar as Sleaze
- Paul Grewal as Dirty Harry
- Raji Samra as Lefty
- Kris Labelle as Ray
- Adila Dosani as Ruby
- Sahaj Malhotra as Cheema's Wife

== Soundtrack ==
Pseudo: Blood of Our Own

Soundtrack album by Mandeep Dhaliwal
- Released: 2012
- Genre: Feature film soundtrack
- Length: 15 minutes

=== Track listing ===
No.	Title	Lyrics	Singer(s)	Length
1.	"Paise Da Khel Tamasha"	Gurinder Surapuri	Rai Jujhar	4:00
2.	"Jagga - Folk Mix"	Traditional	Ranjit Teji	3:57
3.	"Dil Mera"	Mandeep Dhaliwal	Mandeep Dhaliwal	4:24
4.	"Jagga - Gangster Mix"	Traditional & Deep Cold	Mandeep Dhaliwal & Deep Cold	3:50
