= Singh vs Kaur =

2013 Indian film by Navaniat Singh

- Directed by: Navaniat Singh
- Written by: Dheeraj Rattan
- Screenplay by: Dheeraj Rattan
- Story by: Dheeraj Rattan
- Produced by: D. Ramanaidu
- Starring: Gippy Grewal; Surveen Chawla; Rohit Khurana; Binnu Dhillon; Japji Khaira; B. N. Sharma
- Cinematography: Jitan Harmeet Singh
- Edited by: Manish More
- Music by: Jatinder Shah
- Production companies: Suresh Productions; Sippy Grewal Productions; Gurfateh Films
- Release date: 15 February 2013
- Country: India
- Language: Punjabi

Singh vs Kaur is a 2013 Indian Punjabi-language romantic comedy action film directed by Navaniat Singh and starring Gippy Grewal, Surveen Chawla, Japji Khaira and Binnu Dhillon in lead roles. Singh vs Kaur was released on 15 February 2013.

Gippy Grewal sports a turbaned avatar and a beard for the first time in his film career. It is also the first Punjabi film that has been produced by a multi-lingual producer, D. Ramanaidu.

The film was remade in Bengali as Romeo vs Juliet starring Ankush Hazra and Mahiya Mahi, in Odia as Kabula Barabula starring Anubhav Mohanty and in Kannada as Sathya Harishchandra in 2017 starring Sharan (becoming the first Punjabi film to be remade in Kannada).

== Plot ==
Nihal Singh (Gippy Grewal), living in the village of Nalun Tattebha, is considered a burden on the head of villagers and they all decide to throw him out of the village on the advice of Sarpanch (Avtar Gill). Nihal's mother is a widow who lost her husband when Nihal was only a few years old. Meanwhile, Nihal's best friend Taari (Binnu Dhillon), who is addicted to watching girls with his associates on the Internet and print their photos out, plans an idea to clear up the whole situation. Taari says that to solve the situation he should marry Sarpanch's niece Sapna, an overweight girl, which he initially goes through with before regretting his actions. A comic situation arises when Sapna tells her Uncle (Sarpanch) that she loves Nihal and will die if she doesn't marry him.

Sarpanch, with his niece, presents the proposal to his mother. Meanwhile, Nihal says that he doesn't love her and was just joking. Taari again uses his head and prints out the photo of a girl named Jasneet (Surveen Chawla), but Nihal doesn't understand what to do to cancel the marriage proposal. He eventually decides to present a photo of Jasneet, unknown to him at first sight, saying that he loves her. The villagers are unaware of the situation; Nihal's Chachi, who is very jealous of him, asks Nihal if he is actually in love, then asks where she lives. Nihal says that she lives in Canada. Sarpanch tells Nihal to bring the girl in one month to prove his declaration true otherwise he will have no option to marry him to his overweight niece.

Nihal feels helpless, but with Taari's help, he travels to Canada to find the girl. Taari and Geeta arrange with his uncle's house Chacha Dhind (B N Sharma) and his son (Sean Bindra). Finally, he finds Jasneet, who it is revealed has been attacked several times. Jasneet tells Nihal to become her bodyguard. Nihal can't think of a reason to refuse and so accepts. He defends her from attempts on her life, fighting with her rivals. Eventually, he and Jasneet become close friends, but Nihal reveals that she is engaged to her boyfriend (Rohit Khurana) who lives in America. Nihal feels sad after hearing this but soon thinks of an idea: he asks Jasneet to stay with him in Punjab. It is known that the attacks will continue until she turns 21 years old, so Jasneet, having no idea how to prevent the attacks, goes with Nihal to Punjab to prevent any further incidents.

Taari and Geeta kept on showing the photos to the whole village. Jasneet is unaware that she has been lied to by Nihal, but Nihal's mother feels proud after hearing that her son is married. Jasneet soon learns and leaves out of hurt, but then thinks of Nihal's mother and doesn't want to break her heart, so she returns. Upon her return, she and Nihal begin to fall in love with each other.

Another comic situation arises when Nihal takes Jasneet home to Nabha and unintentionally calls his brother a saala (brother-in-law) out of frustration. His girlfriend's brother, mischievous in nature, tells the whole family that his sister is married although the other villagers are unaware of this ever happening. Nihal curses himself for using the word again in his life to someone. Meantime, Jasneet's NRI (Non-Resident Indian) boyfriend comes to take her away, but Jasneet tells him that she now loves Nihal, shocking him.

In the meantime, Nihal learns that Jasneet's NRI boyfriend had a previous relationship with Nihal's friend before breaking up with her. Nihal calls Jasneet to tell her that her NRI friend (Rohit Khurana) is surely a fraud and blackmailer, warning her that he is responsible for all the previous attacks on her after gaining access to her property. Jasneet is shocked and stops the car while travelling with her boyfriend. He then shows his true colors, following her with his men and confessing that he wanted her to stay alive and did not want to kill her; his intention was for Jasneet to turn 21 so that he could marry her and blame her uncle. Nihal soon arrives to save Jasneet, getting rid of her boyfriend and his associates. Jasneet and Nihal then live happily after all the difficulties.

== Cast ==
- Gippy Grewal as Nihal Singh Grewal
- Surveen Chawla as Jasneet Kaur
- Japji Khaira as Simrat
- Binnu Dhillon as Taari
- B N Sharma as Dhindsa
- Daljeet Kaur as Nihal Singh Grewal's mother
- Avtar Gill as Sarpanch
- Tej Hundal as Angrej Singh (cameo)
- Rohit Khurana as Roop
- Sean Bindra as Dhindsa's Son
- Sukhpreet Singh Kalkat as Rupinader Singh
- Jarnail Singh Jelly as Anmol
- Babbal Rai as Samar
- Sardar Sohi as Simrat's Father
- Gurpreet Bhangu as Nihal's Taayi

== Production ==
A song sequence was shot in Victoria, British Columbia.

== Soundtrack ==
| No. | Title | Singer(s) | Length |
|---|---|---|---|
| 1. | "Massi" | Gippy Grewal |
| 2. | "Cut Sleeve" | Gippy Grewal |
| 3. | "Zakhmi Dil" | Gippy Grewal |
| 4. | "Donale" | Gippy Grewal |
| 5. | "Bugchu" | Gippy Grewal |
| 6. | "Singh" | Gippy Grewal |
| 7. | "Panditji" | Karamjit Anmol |

== Reception ==
The film has received mostly positive reviews. According to Ballewood.in, "Singh vs Kaur is a slick action comedy that would set new benchmarks for the Punjabi film industry. A full-blown masala entertainer that establishes Gippy Grewal as the first real action hero of Punjab." Gippy Grewal's performance has been especially appreciated. "It is an entertainer where you have songs, dance, entertainment, power packed dialogues and full power South Indian style action."

Rick of Punjabiportal.com praised the movie but pointed out certain technical errors as well. He praised Gippy Grewal and Surveen Chawla for their spontaneous acting but pointed out the abrupt editing and too much attention given to style in action sequences.

According to box office reports, Singh vs Kaur has scored very well in Punjab after also having a strong start. It can be considered another blockbuster in Gippy's career. It had the third highest opening week collections for a Punjabi film at the time of release in Punjab before Gippy's next film Lucky Di Unlucky Story came and beat it and took first place. The opening week collections for this film were Rs 113.5 million.

== Remakes ==
The film has been remade in Bengali as Romeo vs Juliet. It was an Indo-Bangladesh joint project. It was also remade in Odia in 2017 as Kabula Barabula starring Anubhav Mohanty and in Kannada as Sathya Harishchandra in 2017 starring Sharan and became the first Punjabi film to be remade in Kannada.

Producer D. Ramanaidu was quite impressed with the film and wanted it to be remade in Telugu as well.
