= Neetu Singh (born 1990) =

Indian model and actress

- Born: 26 November 1990 (age 35)
- Occupation: Actress

Neetu Singh (born 26 November 1990) is a model and Punjabi actress. She won Miss PTC Punjabi in 2008 and soon after was in the music video "Call Jalandhar Ton" by Harbhajan Maan. Her first film appearance was in 2012 in Dil Tainu Karda Ae Pyaar with Gulzar Inder Chahal. She also appeared in Saadi Love Story, released in January 2013, the Bollywood heist film, Special 26, released in February 2013, Ji Karda (2014) and Sardar Saab (2017).

In an interview with The Times of India, Singh said she was very clear about her future. She said she had finished modeling and would prefer acting for Punjabi cinema over Bollywood cinema. Her final ambition is to go into politics.

== Filmography ==
Year	Film	Role
2012	Dil Tainu Karda Ae Pyaar	
2013	Saadi Love Story	Gurleen Kaur
2013	Special 26	Waseem's wife
2014	Ji Karda	
2017	Sardar Saab	
