= Jaidev Kumar =

Indian musician and producer (born 1983)

- Born: Jaidev Kumar; September 23, 1983 (age 43); Delhi, India
- Origin: Delhi, India
- Genres: Bhangra, Punjabi music
- Occupations: Record producer, music director, composer
- Years active: 1999–present
- Website: jaidevkumar.com

Jaidev Kumar is an Indian musician and producer. His first hit album was Dil Le Gayi Kudi Gujarat Di.

== Television ==
Year	Show	Role	Notes
2020	Sa Re Ga Ma Pa Punjabi	Judge	Along with Jazzy B and Sonu Kakkar

== Filmography as Music Composer/Producer ==
- Jee Aayan Nu
- Asa Nu Maan Watna Da (2004)
- Des Hoyaa Pardes
- Mel Karade Rabba (2010)
- Sukhmani – Hope for Life
- Chak Jawana
- Yaara o Dildaara
- Taur Mittran Di
- Dharti (2011)
- Yaaran Naal Baharan
- Khushiyaan
- Waris Shah: Ishq Daa Waaris
- Love Exchange
- Tera Mera Ki Rishta
- Pata Nahi Rabb Kehdeyan Rangan Ch Raazi
- Mannat
- Yaariyan (2008)
- Saadi Love Story
- Dil Tainu Karda Hai Pyar
- Chardi Jawani
- Vaisakhi List
- Channa Mereya
- Aate Di Chidi (2018)
- Jindua
- Daana Paani
- Shareek
- Ishqedaariya
- Sweeti Weds NRI
- Kala Shah Kala
- Rangeelay
- Motor Mittran Di
- Kaptaan
- Haani
- 25 Kille
- Gaddar
- High End Yaariyaan
- Khedo Khundi
- Bajatey Raho (2013)
- Munda Faridkotiya
- Chaar Sahibzaade (2014)
- Mini Punjab
- Banda Singh Bahadur
- Behen Hogi Teri (2017)
- Dangar Doctor
- Rabb Da Radio
- Veerey Di Wedding
- Aate Di Chidi
- Mr.&Mrs 420
- Sahib Biwi Aur Gangster
- Blackia
- Santa Banta Pvt Ltd.
- Wah Taj
- Subedar Joginder Singh
- Yaariyaan
- Bajre Da Sitta (2022)
- Code Name: Tiranga (2022)
- Luv Ki Arrange Marriage (2024)

== Albums as music producer ==
- Oye Hoye – Harbhajan Mann
- Amrit Da Batta – Harbhajan Mann
- Lala Lala Lala – Harbhajan Mann
- Nachlai – Harbhajan Mann
- Haaye Meri Billo – Harbhajan Mann
- Satrangi Peengh – Harbhajan Mann
- Dil Dol Gaya – Harbhajan Mann
- Satrangi Peengh 2 - Harbhajan Mann
- Boot Polishan – Gurdas Maan
- Punjeeri – Gurdas Maan
- Vaari Vaari – Harbhajan Mann
- Jogiya – Gurdas Maan
- Dil Lai Gayee – Jasbir Jassi
- O HO! – Sardool Sikander
- Os Kudi Ne – Sardool Sikander
- Nakhra Janab Da – Sardool Sikander
- 21st Chapter of Hans Raj Hans – Hans Raj Hans
- Kudi Kudi – Jasbir Jassi
- Nishani Payar Di – Jasbir Jassi
- Mukhda Chan Warga – Jasbir Jassi
- Rabbi – Rabbi Shergill
- Saaun Di Jhadi – Babbu Mann
- Jaan – Jeet Jagjit
- Teri Meri Ik Jind – various singers
- Chorni – Hans Raj Hans
- Ghama Di Raat – Hans Raj Hans
- Roiyaan – Farhan Saeed
