= Taur Mittran Di =

- Theatrical release poster
- Directed by: Navaniat Singh
- Written by: Dheeraj Rattan
- Produced by: Eros Entertainment & Jimmy Sheirgill Productions
- Starring: Amrinder Gill; Rannvijay Singh; Mukesh Rishi; Surveen Chawla; Amita Pathak
- Music by: Jaidev Kumar
- Release date: 11 May 2012
- Country: India
- Language: Punjabi

Taur Mittran Di is a 2012 Punjabi drama action comedy film starring Amrinder Gill, Rannvijay Singh, and Surveen Chawla. The story is about a college rivals who unite to fight local corruption. Directed by Navaniat Singh, the film was produced by Jimmy Sheirgill and Eros Entertainment. The film was released on 11 May 2012.

The film features the song "Assi Munde Hai Punjabi" composed by B Praak, which became a hit. Japji Khera did a cameo role in this film.

== Cast ==
- Amrinder Gill as Himmat
- Rannvijay Singh as Ranbir
- Mukesh Rishi
- Surveen Chawla as Keerat
- Amita Pathak as Seerat
- Binnu Dhillon
- B.N. Sharma
- Rana Ranbir
- Japji Khera as an item number

== Crew ==
- Director: Navaniat Singh
- Producer: Jimmy Sheirgill
- Writer: Dheeraj Rattan
- DOP: Jitan Harmeet Singh
- Costume: Rupa Chourasia
- Sound: Joe Rodrigues & Abhijeet V. Sapre
- Visual Effects: Rajesh Kaushik & Nilesh Uttarwar
- Choreographer: Bhupi
- Assistant Choreographer: Sahil dev & David

== Soundtrack ==
No.	Title	Artist(s)	Length
1.	"Assi Munde Haan Punjabi"	Amrinder Gill, Praky B	3:24
2.	"Dil Tera Ho Gaya"	Amrinder Gill, Sumitra Iyyer	3:58
3.	"Darshan Di Bukh"	Amrinder Gill, Jaggi Singh, Shipra Goyal	4:36
4.	"Nai Rukna"	Amrinder Gill, Manpal Singh	4:21
5.	"Taur Mittran Di"	Amrinder Gill, Gajendra Verma	4:34
