= Rangeelay =

- Directed by: Navaniat Singh
- Story by: Dheeraj Rattan
- Produced by: Sunil Lulla; Jimmy Sheirgill
- Starring: Jimmy Sheirgill; Neha Dhupia
- Cinematography: Yashaswi Bhargava
- Music by: Jaidev Kumar
- Release date: 16 May 2013
- Running time: 130 minutes
- Country: India
- Language: Punjabi

Rangeelay is a 2013 Punjabi movie directed by Navaniat Singh, featuring Jimmy Sheirgill and Neha Dhupia in the lead roles. The movie is produced by Jimmy Shergill in association with Eros International, and it marks Neha Dhupia's debut in Punjabi cinema. The movie was released on 16 May 2013. The film opened to average opening in India and poor opening overseas. Rangeelay was also a critical failure.

After Dharti (2011) and Taur Mittran Di (2012), Rangeelay is the third production of Jimmy Sheirgill Productions.

== Cast ==
- Jimmy Sheirgill as Sunny
- Neha Dhupia as Simmi
- Diljit Singh as dj
- Pankesh Mann as Maan
- Jaswinder Bhalla as DSP
- Shivinder Mahal as Major Saab
- Binnu Dhillon as Titli
- Rana Ranbir as Shotgun
- Jassi Kaur as Jassi
- Angad Bedi as Ricky And Vicky(Double Role)

== Songs ==
- "Rangeelay" (Title Song) by Babbal Rai
- "Headache" by Mika Singh
- "Tere Bina Din Mere" by Feroz Khan
- "Yaara Tu" by Ashim Kemson & Shipra Goyal
- "Dil De Kutte" by Jashan Singh
- "Boloyaan" by Nishawn Bhullar & Simran-Tripat
- "Dil De Kutte" by Sonu Nigam

Bollywood celebrity Neha Dhupia made her debut in Punjabi films with Rangeelay.
