= List of Punjabi films of 2012 =

This is a list of Panjabi films of 2012.

== List of films ==
| Title | Director | Cast | Genre | Release date | Producer | Ref. |
|---|---|---|---|---|---|---|
| Pure Punjabi | Munish Sharma | Karan Kundra, Manjot Singh, Nav Bajwa, Kanwar Zorawar Singh, Sangram Singh, Dhriti Saharan, Deepak Raja, Sukhbir Singh, Narinder Jattu, Paramjot Singh, Harpal Singh | Comedy | 13 January 2012 | Batra Showbiz and Kapil Batra Production in association with Sandal Production Calgary | |
| Pata Nahi Rabb Kehdeyan Rangan Ch Raazi | Ravinder Peepat | Tarun Khanna, Neeru Bajwa, Rana Jung Bahadur, Gurpreet Ghuggi, Rana Ranveer, Harry Josh, Amar Noorie | Drama | 17 February 2012 | Kapil Batra Films Production House | |
| Rehmataan | Rajveer Singh Maan | Deep Dhillon. Jasmine Jassi, Gurvinder Brar, Gugu Gill, Sukhbir Razia, Surinder Shinda, Sukhjinder Shera | Drama | 16 March 2012 | BAM ARTS | |
| Mirza – The Untold Story | Baljit Singh Deo | Gippy Grewal, Mandy Takhar, Rahul Dev, Binnu Dhillon | Action/Romance | 6 April 2012 | Inda Raikoti & Aman Khatkar | |
| Taur Mittran Di | Navaniat Singh | Arminder, Ranvijay Singh, Surveen, Amita Pathak, Mukesh Rishi | | 11 May 2012 | Eros Entertainment & Jimmy Sheirgill Productions | |
| Aappan Pher Milange | Ravinder Ravi | Gracy Singh, Jas Dhillon, Vishal Karwal, Kanwaljit Singh, Amar Noorie, Girija Shankar, Jaswinder Bhalla, Smita Jayker, Parmod Pabbi, Mani Kapoor, Sudesh Dhiman, Jatinder Suri | | 25 May 2012 | JLPL FILMS PVT. LTD. | |
| Rahe Chardi Kala Punjab Di | Shapinder Saini | Shakti Kapoor, Sharad Saxena, Prabhleen Sandhu, Dakshh Ajit Singh, Jimmy Sharma, Sapna Thakur | | 25 May 2012 | Jasvir Singh Sidhu | |
| Kabaddi Once Again | Sukhminder Dhanjal | Varinder Singh, Sudeepa Singh, Jaswinder Bhalla, Nachhatar Gill, Binu Dhillon, Rana Jung Bahadur, Rana Ranbir, Amar Noorie | Sports | 8 June 2012 | Harjinder Singh Dhanoa | |
| Desi Romeos | Ishafaq Khan | Babbu Mann, Harjit Harman, Bhupinder Gill, Jasprem Dhillon, Shilpa Dhar, Bittu, Mitesh, Ravi Bal | | 15 June 2012 | Maan Films | |
| Jatt & Juliet | Anurag Singh | Diljit Singh Dosanjh, Neeru Bajwa, Jaswinder Bhalla, BN Sharma, Rana Ranbir, Karamjeet Anmol, Sari Mercer, Upasana Singh | Romantic Comedy | 29 June 2012 | Gunbir Singh Sidhu, Darshan Grewal (Grewalz Cine Corp & Speed Records) | |
| Yaraan Naal Baharaan 2 | Samit Brar | Rajwinder Sumal, Rishita Monga, Vikramjeet Virk, Shivindera Mahal, Yograj Singh, Balwinder Kaur (Beggowal), Jitendra Rose Kaur, Aman Sutdhar, Parminder Gill, Prince Kawaljeet Singh, Rakesh Dhawan | | 13 July 2012 | Dreamers Production | |
| Carry On Jatta | Smeep Kang | Gippy Grewal, Mahie Gill, Binnu Dhillon, Jaswinder Bhalla, Gurpreet Ghuggi, B.N. Sharma, Karamjit Anmol, Rana Ranbir, Khushboo Grewal | Comedy | 27 July 2012 | Sippy Grewal, Pushpinder Happy, Sukha Singh, Semi Dhaliwal | |
| Sirphire | Harjit Singh Ricky | Preet Harpal, Monica Bedi, Priyanshu Chatterjee, Gurleen Chopra, Roshan Prince, Karamjeet Anmol | | 10 August 2012 | Gurpreet Singh Sidhu | |
| Anhe Ghore Da Daan (Alms for a Blind Horse) | Gurvinder Singh | Samuel John, Mal Singh, Serbjeet Kaur, Dharminder Kaur, Emmanuel Singh, Kulwindeer Kaur, Lakha Singh, Gurinder Makna | Critically Acclaimed | 10 August 2012 (Theatrical release) | National Film Development Corporation of India (NFDC) | |
| Yaar Pardesi | Gurbir Singh Grewal | Claudia Ciesla, Vandana Singh, Gurpreet Ghuggi, Dhanveer Singh, Navdeep Kaler, Binnu Dhillon, B.N. Sharma, Raghveer Boli, Tarsinder Singh, Anita Meet, Anita Shabdeesh, Sanjeev Rai, Rupinder Barnala | | 24 August 2012 | AVI FILMS ENTERPRISES | |
| Raula Pai Gaya | Atharv Baluja | Ravinder Grewal, Surbhi Jyoti, Kartar Cheema, Jaswinder Bhalla, Binnu Dhillon, BN Sharma, Maninder Velly, Parjesh Kapil | Comedy | 31 August 2012 | Ravinder Grewal | |
| Ajj De Ranjhe | Manmohan Singh | Aman Dhaliwal, Gurpreet Ghuggi, Kim Verma, Gurleen Chopra, Rana Ranbir, Deep Dhillon | | 7 September 2012 | Punjaab Movies International in association with Reliance Entertainment | |
| Pinky Moge Wali | Vikram Dhillon | Gavie Chahal, Neeru Bajwa, Geeta Zaildaar, KS Makhan, B. N. Sharma, Rana Jung Bahadur, Harpal Singh, Avtar Gill, Shavinder Mahal | | 28 September 2012 | Kapil Batra Production House Pvt Ltd | |
| Saadi Wakhri Hai Shaan | Gurbir Singh Grewal | Sangram Singh, Mandy Takhar, Binnu Dhillon, Rana Ranbir, Shivendra Mahal, Harpal SinghGurpreet Ratole, Mannu Sandhu (Miss Canada Runner Up), Tarsinder Thind, Anita Meet, Dharminder Grewal, Abhiroy Cheema, Amrik Mangat | | 12 October 2012 | Dr Inderroop Singh Ghuman, Dr Sukhpal Singh Mangat, Mr Bikramjit Singh Gill | |
| Burrraah | Hemant Sagar Sharma | Mukul Dev, Yuvraj Hans, Harish Verma, Veer Vashisht, Deep Joshi, Manav Vij, Bikramjit Randhawa, BN Sharma | | 19 October 2012 | diy Entertainment | |
| Power Cut | Jaspal Bhatti | Jaspal Bhatti, Jaswinder Bhalla, Prem Chopra, BN Sharma, Gurchet Chitrakar, Savita Bhatti, Surilie Gautam, Jasraj Singh Bhatti | | 26 October 2012 | Mad Arts, Jaspal Bhatti Film School | |
| Dil Tainu Karda Ae Pyar | Ajay Pannalal | Gulzar Inder Chahal, Neetu Singh, Gurpreet Ghuggi, Kanwaljeet Singh, | Romantic Comedy | 2 November 2012 | Gulzar Inder Singh Chahal, Kinsis Filmss | |
| Meri Chargay Jawani Sohniyeh | Daljit Singh Baath | Surjit Khan, Baljit Malwa | | 23 November 2012 | | |
| Munde Patiala De | Mohan Sharma | Gaurav Kakkar, Rahul Kalra, Surbhi Jyoti, Aman Jot, Binnu Dhillon, Satwant Kaur | Romantic Comedy | 30 November 2012 | | |
| Sadi Gali Aaya Karo | Sunil (Pali) | Anuj Puri, Zoya, Harpal Singh, Nav Bajwa, Priyanka, Razia Sukhbir | Romance, Drama and Comedy | 14 December 2012 | B.M. Entertainment Company | |
