= Mandy Takhar =

British model and actress (born 1987)

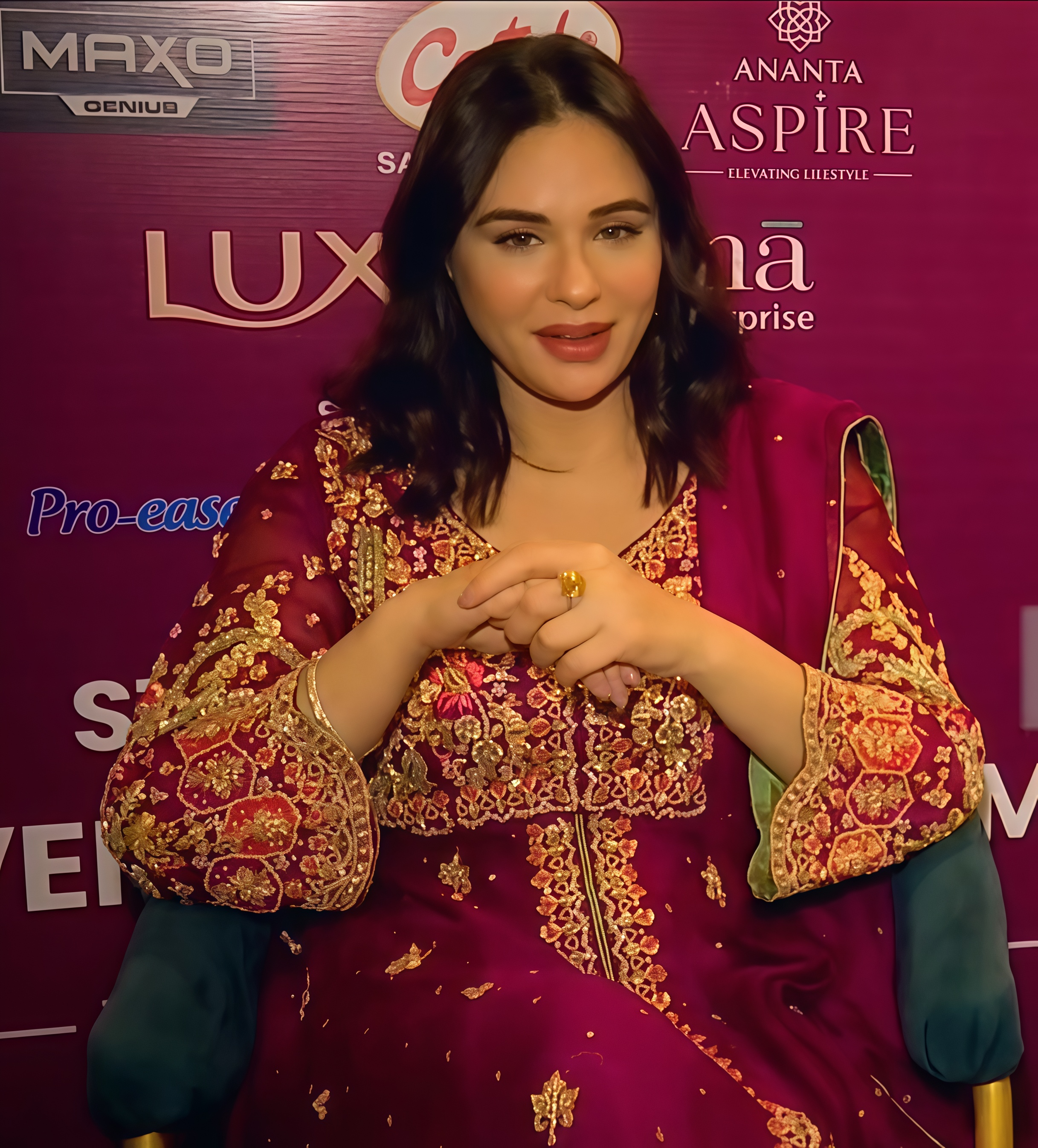
- Takhar in 2026
- Born: 1 May 1987 (age 39); Wolverhampton, West Midlands, England
- Education: Kingston University
- Occupations: Actress; model
- Years active: 2010–present
- Spouse: Shekhar Kaushal (m. 2024; div. 2026)

Mandy Takhar (born 1 May 1987) is a British actress who works in Indian cinema, predominantly in Punjabi with roles in Hindi and Tamil films as well.

== Personal life ==
Mandy Takhar was born and raised in the city of Wolverhampton in the UK. She traces her roots to Maliana, a small village near Phagwara in Punjab, India. She moved to London from her family home when she was 17, to study drama at the Kingston University and then left the UK in 2009 to work as an actor in the Indian film industry.

Takhar married Shekhar Kaushal, a gym trainer and CEO, on 13 February 2024 following both Hindu and Sikh wedding rituals. The couple got divorced on 16 January 2026 after the Saket family court allowed the first motion filed by the couple on mutual consent.

== Career ==
Mandy moved to Mumbai and landed the role opposite Punjabi singer Babbu Mann in the 2010 film Ekam - Son of Soil. In 2012, she played the lead role of Sahiba opposite Gippy Grewal in the film Mirza - The Untold Story, a modern adaptation of the love story of Mirza-Sahiba. Her portrayal of Sahiba got her nominated for the best actress at the PTC Punjabi Film Awards.

In 2013, she starred in Tu Mera 22 Main Tera 22 a comedy alongside Amrinder Gill and Honey Singh. She played the role of a teacher and won hearts again and got the award for most prominent & popular face and youth Icon of 2012-2013 at the 6th Punjabi Film and Music Festival.

She made her debut in Tamil cinema with Venkat Prabhu's Biriyani starring Karthi. She won the award for best supporting actor at PTC Punjabi Film Awards.

In early 2017 she appeared in the Punjabi film Rabb Da Radio.

In 2017 she co-hosted the Brit Asia TV Music Awards with Sukhi Bart.

== Filmography ==
Year	Film	Role	Language	Notes
2010	Ekam – Son of Soil	Navneet	Punjabi	with Babbu Maan
2012	Mirza – The Untold Story	Sahiba	Punjabi	With Gippy Grewal & Honey Singh
2012	Bumboo	Pinky	Hindi	Directed by Jagdish Rajpurohit
2012	Saadi Wakhri Hai Shaan	Jot	Punjabi	
2013	Tu Mera 22 Main Tera 22	Simmy	Punjabi	With Amrinder Gill & Honey Singh
2013	Ishq Garaari	Miss Sweety	Punjabi	With Sharry Maan
2013	Biriyani	Maya	Tamil	Director Venkat Prabhu
2015	Sardaarji	Jasmine	Punjabi	(Director Rohit Jugraj, Producer White Hill Productions) With Diljit Dosanjh
2015	Munde Kamaal De	Sonia	Punjabi	(Director Amit Prasher) With Amrinder Gill
2016	Ardaas	Binder	Punjabi	Directed by Gippy Grewal
2016	Sardaar Ji 2	Guest appearance	Punjabi	Special appearance in "Poplin"
2016	Kadavul Irukaan Kumaru	Audi Car Lady	Tamil	Special appearance
2017	Rabb Da Radio	Naseeb Kaur	Punjabi	with Tarsem Jassar
2018	Khido Khundi	Laali	Punjabi	with Ranjit Bawa
2019	Lukan Michi	TBA	Punjabi	with Preet Harpal
2019	Band Vaaje	Billo	Punjabi	with Binnu Dhillon
2019	Saak	Chann Kaur	Punjabi	with Jobanpreet Singh
2021	Yes I Am Student	Reet	Punjabi	with Sidhu Moosewala
2022	Television	Rano	Punjabi	With Kulwinder Billa
2024	Vadda Ghar	TBA	Punjabi	With Jobanpreet Singh
2025	Six Each	Navdeep	Punjabi	With Hardeep Grewal
2025	Enna Nu Rehna Sehna Ni Aaunda	Kiran	Punjabi	With Jassie Gill

=== Music videos ===
Year	Song	Artist	Music	Lyrics	Label
2020	Tod Da E Dil	Ammy Virk	Avvy Sra	Maninder Buttar	Desi Melodies
2020	Dil Chahte Ho	Jubin Nautiyal	Payal Dev	A.M Turaz	T-Series
2025	One Thousand Miles	Yo Yo Honey Singh	Yo Yo Honey Singh	Yo Yo Honey Singh	T-Series

== Awards and nominations ==
Year	Award	Category	Movie	Result
2016	PTC Punjabi Film Awards	Best Supporting Actress	Sardaarji	Won
2012-13	6th Punjabi Film and Music Festival	Most Prominent & Popular Face and Youth Icon	--	Won
2013	PTC Punjabi Film Awards	Best Actress	Mirza – The Untold Story	Won
