= Amit Prasher =

Indian film director (born 1980)

- Born: Amit Prasher; 21 March 1980 (age 46); Nakodar, Punjab, India
- Occupations: Director, Producer
- Years active: 2002—present

Amit Prasher is an Indian film director. His work as a filmmaker include the films Tu Mera 22 Main Tera 22 and Ishq Brandy.

== Filmography ==
=== Director ===
Year	Film	Actor	Producer	Language	Release date
2013	Tu Mera 22 Main Tera 22	Yo Yo Honey Singh & Amrinder Gill	Speed Surya Films	Punjabi	25 Jan
2014	Ishq Brandy	Roshan Prince, Alfaaz & Binnu Dhillon	Future Cine Vision	Punjabi	21 Feb
2015	Munde Kamaal De	Amrinder Gill, Yuvraj Hans, Binnu Dhillon	SRD Motion Pictures	Punjabi	20 March

=== Assistant Director ===
Film	Actor	Language
Taur Mittran Di	Amrinder Gill & Rannvijay	Punjabi
Dharti	Jimmy Shergill & Rannvijay	Punjabi
