= Jatts in Golmaal =

- Directed by: Ksshitij Chaudhary & R Raja
- Written by: Naresh Kathooria
- Produced by: Manmohan Singh Harveen Singh & Harpreet Singh
- Starring: Arya Babbar; Sameksha; Gurpreet Ghuggi; Binnu Dhillon; Jaswinder Bhalla; B. N. Sharma
- Cinematography: Krishna ramanan
- Music by: Jatinder Shah
- Release date: 24 May 2013
- Country: India
- Language: Punjabi

Jatts in Golmaal is a 2013 Punjabi film. The movie was released on 24 May 2013. Veena Malik makes her debut in Indian Punjabi cinema with her role in the film.

== Plot ==
Sunny (Arya Babbar) is a jobless young man in a Punjab village who dreams of emigrating to Canada. He keeps visiting travel agencies for visa assistance, while he is actually not qualified—he is not educated, he does not speak English, nor does he have the money to support his immigration. At one point, he visits Raavi's (Sameksha) travel agency to ask for assistance in applying for a Canadian visa, but she rejects him after learning he is not qualified. However, Sunny later meets Raavi on another occasion, at which time Raavi develops her love for him.

Jugnu (Gurpreet Ghuggi) is the owner of a new travel agency in the same place who has not even succeeded in getting one single visa for his customer yet, and he is struggling to pay the rent. Jugnu owes 20,000 Rs to the landlord of his agency as rent. The latter threatens to cut off the agency's electricity if he does not receive the money owed to him within 10 days. Sunny visits Jugnu's travel agency to apply for his much-desired Canada visa. Jugnu agrees to help but asks Sunny for 2 million Rs as a handling fee. Sunny does not have that much money himself but agrees to the deal as he thinks his family can obtain it for him.

Delighted, Sunny breaks the good news to his family and asks for 2 million Rs. At first, they refuse but, after considering that he will become a success in Canada, they mortgage their land to a local drug smuggler named Titoo (Binnu Dhillon), borrow 2 million Rs from him, and give the money to Sunny. Meanwhile, Titoo learns that he has a heart problem and is told by his doctor that he needs a heart transplant.

Jugnu's girlfriend is Khushi, whose father has just gotten her engaged to Titoo. Angry, Jugnu visits Khushi's father to ask that Khushi marry him instead of Titoo. Khushi's father agrees on the condition that Jugnu have 2 million Rs in savings. Jugnu promises to show him the money a few days later as he is confident that he will be able to obtain a visa for Sunny.

Sunny pays 2 million Rs to Jugnu as a visa handling fee, which Jugnu shows to Khushi's father, who then agrees to have his daughter marry him. Jugnu's plan to get Sunny a visa is to make the latter pretend that he is a drummer accompanying a singer to Canada to perform in a play. However, this singer happens to be a scammer: he takes Jugnu's 2 million Rs and gives him a fake visa.

In addition, Khushi's father tries to break his promise to Jugnu by making plans to have his daughter marry Titoo. Upset, Khushi elopes with Jugnu, who at this time is expected to give Sunny his passport, the fake visa, and a plane ticket at the airport. Eloping with Khushi, Jugnu has to switch off his phone, even though Sunny is waiting for him at the airport.

Unable to board the flight or to contact Jugnu, Sunny realizes that Jugnu has betrayed him. He also realizes that he will not be able to repay the 2 million Rs advanced to him by his family. He decides to commit suicide to get an insurance payment so that he can repay his debt, but Raavi saves him. At this point, she tells him that she likes him. Raavi is kind but she happens to be Titoo's sister. She suggests that Sunny report Titoo's information to the police so he can get a reward to repay his debt, but Sunny bungles the plan and is caught by Titoo.

Titoo now wants to kill Sunny and have his heart transplanted to him. Raavi somehow saves Sunny and his friends and informs his family about what happened. A fight breaks out between Sunny's family that has come to save him and Titoo's men who are chasing Sunny to kill him. Sunny defeats Titoo's men, and Raavi persuades them to give up their illegal business.

== Release ==
The movie was released on 25 May 2013 worldwide.

== Cast ==
- Arya Babbar as Sunny
- Sameksha as Raavi
- Gurpreet Ghuggi as Jugnu
- Binnu Dhillon as Titu Badmaash
- Jaswinder Bhalla as Bali Chacha
- B.N. Sharma as Titu's Mama
- Veena Malik as Sujata (item number "Shaboo")
- Sardar Sohi as Kang Saab
- Karamjit Anmol
- Harpreet Johal
- Kanwalpreet Singh
- Rubina as Guest Appearance

== Soundtrack ==
The music was composed by Jatinder Shah and released by Saga Music.

Jatts In Golmaal

Soundtrack album by Jatinder Shah
- Released: May 7, 2013
- Recorded: 2013
- Genre: Soundtrack
- Length: 21:11
- Label: Saga Music
- Producer: Jatinder Shah

Jatinder Shah chronology
Lucky Di Unlucky Story (2013)	Jatts In Golmaal (2013)	Jatt & Juliet 2 (2013)

Track list
No.	Title	Lyrics	Singer(s)	Length
1.	"Jatt Baal Duga Deve Ni"	Raj Kakra	Mika Singh	2:34
2.	"Akhiyan"	Raj Kakra	Rimpy Gaar, Roshan Prince	4:14
3.	"Kambhkat Dil"	Raj Kakra	Adirija, Sukhwinder Singh	3:09
4.	"Shaboo"	Veet Baljit	Sunidhi Chauhan	2:56
5.	"Jatts In Golmaal (Remix)"	Shweta Saayra	Rajbir Dhillon	2:17
6.	"Jatts In Golmaal"	Shweta Saayra	Manak-e	2:17
7.	"Todi Na Dil"	Kumaar	Shahid Mallya	3:44
Total length:				21:11
