= Jobanpreet Singh =

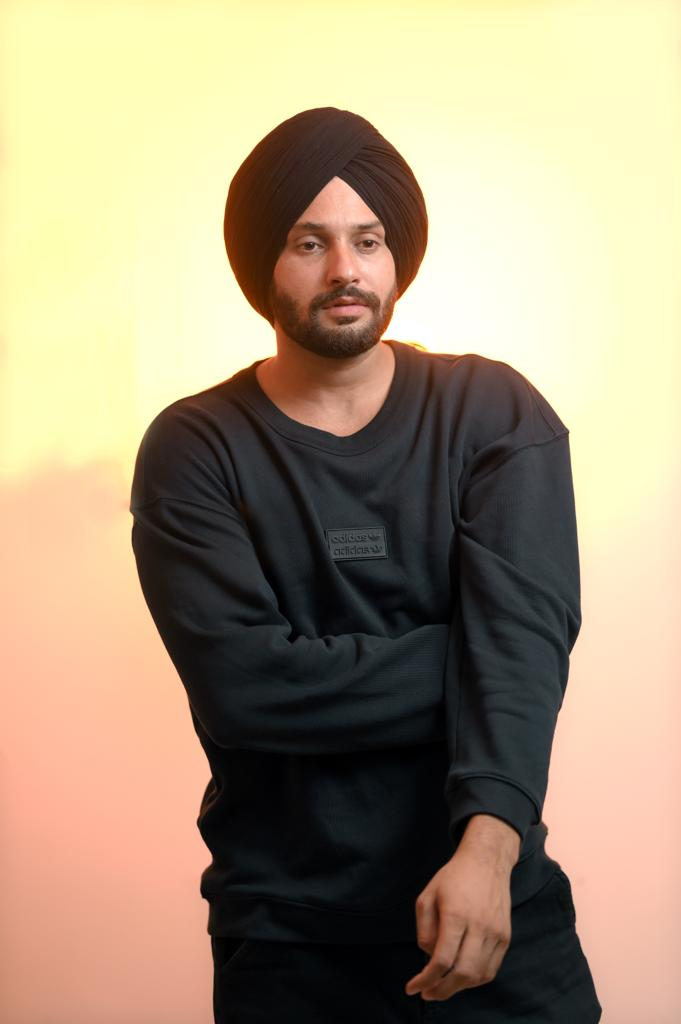
- Born: Jobanpreet Singh; 20 April; Ludhiana, Punjab
- Occupation: Actor . Writer . Producer
- Years active: 2014 - Present
- Height: 5 ft 11 in (180 cm)
- Website: Jobanpreet Singh on Instagram

Jobanpreet Singh, better known as Joban, is an Indian actor, writer and producer who works primarily in Punjabi cinema. He is best known for playing the role of Karam Singh in Saak (2019) and Shinda in Jahankilla (2024).

== Early life ==
Jobanpreet Singh is an Indian actor, writer, and filmmaker, known for his contributions to both Hindi and Punjabi cinema. He hails from a Sikh Jatt family in the Ludhiana region of Punjab. From an early age, Singh displayed an undying passion for storytelling, which eventually guided his career path in the entertainment industry.

After completing a Bachelor of Arts degree, Singh joined the Punjab Police, undergoing rigorous training at the Police Recruits Training Centre (PRTC) Jahan Khelan in Hoshiarpur. He subsequently served as a police officer in Ludhiana. Despite his commitment to law enforcement, his passion for cinema never waned. Singh joined a local theatre club in Ludhiana where he cultivated his love for acting and storytelling.

His persistence led to supporting roles in notable Hindi films, including Sarbjit (starring Aishwarya Rai Bachchan) and Dil Jo Na Keh Saka (produced by T-Series). Singh also appeared in Disney+ Hotstar's series Masoom, and made a mark in Punjabi cinema with supporting roles in films like Rupinder Gandhi 2: The Robinhood, Kande, and Sarabha.

Beyond acting, Singh gained valuable experience behind the scenes. He worked as an Assistant Production Manager on Dangal for Aamir Khan Productions and assisted as a Casting Director for Dil Jo Na Keh Saka and Kande. His multi-faceted skill set in production and casting further enriched his understanding of the filmmaking process.

In September 2019, Singh made his debut as the lead actor in the Punjabi film Saak starring Mandy Takhar. The film garnered him a nomination for Best Debut Actor at the PTC Punjabi Film Awards in 2020, marking a significant milestone in his career.

In September 2024, Singh's much-anticipated project Jahankilla hit the big screen. Not only did Singh write the script, but he also portrayed the lead character, Shinda. Jahankilla holds personal significance for Singh, as it was inspired by his own experiences during police training. The film is a dedication to first responders, honoring the real-life heroes who serve the community. Additionally, Jahankilla showcases new and emerging talent, reflecting Singh's commitment to take risks, break boundaries and set new standards and narratives. Jahankilla was also exclusively premiered at the Toronto International Film Festival where it was critically acclaimed and praised. The event was personally attended by former Indian cricketer and personality Kapil Dev to promote everything this film stands for. With his being his second main lead release, Jobanpreet once again showcased his talent by bringing home the Best Actor award, presented by the Moonwhite Films International Film Fest.

In November 2024, the year is set to close with the much-anticipated release of Vadda Ghar. The heartfelt film emphasizes the importance of living together under one roof. The movie conveys that a home is made grand not by its size but by the love and respect shared among the members living in harmony together.

Looking ahead to 2025, audiences can expect the release of the family-packed emotional rollercoaster, Kikli which stars Mandy Takhar and Wamiqa Gabbi as the female leads opposite Jobanpreet Singh.

== Filmography & Career ==
Year	Film/Show	Role	Notes
2016	Sarbjit	Pakranger	Supporting Cast
2016	Dangal	Assistant Production Manager	Aamir Khan Productions
2017	Rupinder Gandhi 2: The Robinhood	Harry	Supporting Cast
2017	Dil Jo Na Keh Saka	Tyagi	Supporting Cast & Casting Director
2018	Kande	Deepa	Supporting Cast & Casting Director
2019	Saak	Karam Singh	Main Lead
2022	Masoom	Jogi	Supporting Cast
2023	Sarabha	Kanhaya Singh	Supporting Cast
2024	Jahankilla	Shinda (Shamsher Singh)	Main Lead
2024	Vadda Ghar	Jasbir Singh	Main Lead
2025	Kikli	Sooba Singh	Main Lead

=== Writing Projects ===
Year	Film	Notes
2024	Jahankilla	Writer - Story & Screenplay
2024	Kikli	Co-writer/Screenplay
2025	Lafaind	Writer - Story & Screenplay

=== Other Entertainment ===
Year	Project	Name	Role/Notes
2022	TV Show	Hasseya Da Halla	Chief Guest
2023	Music Video	Moonlight	Main Lead
2023	Music Video	3 Saal with Kaur B	Main Lead
2025	Music Video	Sajjan Chale Gye with Jenny Johal	Main Lead
2025	TV Show	Spotlight with Mandy	Guest

== Awards & Recognitions ==
Year	Award	Category	Movie	Result
2020	PTC Punjabi Film Awards	Best Debut Actor	Saak	Nominated
2024	Moonlight Films International Film Fest	Best Actor	Jahankilla	Won
