= Wamiqa Gabbi =

Indian actress (born 1993)

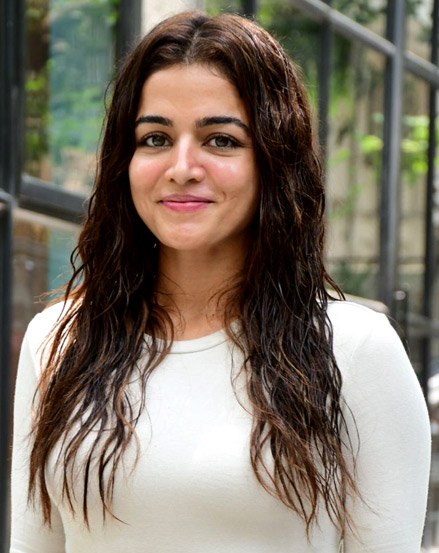
- Gabbi in 2024
- Born: 29 September 1993 (age 33); Chandigarh, India
- Education: DAV College, Chandigarh (B.A.)
- Occupation: Actress
- Years active: 2007–present

Wamiqa Gabbi (born 29 September 1993) is an Indian actress who predominantly works in Hindi and Punjabi films. She made her screen debut as a child with a brief role in the Hindi film Jab We Met (2007). She later established herself as a leading lady in Punjabi cinema with roles in comedy films, such as Tu Mera 22 Main Tera 22 (2013), Nikka Zaildar 2 (2017) and its sequel Nikka Zaildar 3 (2019), as well as the crime drama Kali Jotta (2023).

Gabbi expanded into other languages with the Tamil romance Maalai Naerathu Mayakkam (2016) and the Malayalam sports drama Godha (2017). She then transitioned into a period focused on Hindi streaming ventures, gaining critical acclaim in 2023 with her performance of an aspiring actress in the period drama series Jubilee, followed by her role as a spy's wife in Vishal Bhardwaj's thriller film Khufiya, which earned her a Filmfare OTT Award.

She has since found success in mainstream Hindi cinema with the comedies Bhool Chuk Maaf (2025), Bhooth Bangla and Pati Patni Aur Woh Do (both 2026) and has earned further acclaim for her role as Chandra in the Tamil romantic action film DC (2026).

== Early life and education ==
Gabbi was born in a Punjabi family in Chandigarh on 29 September 1993. Her father Govardhan Gabbi is an author and writes in Hindi and Punjabi languages. Her mother Raj Kaushal is a teacher who owns and operates her own junior high school. Gabbi studied at St. Xavier's School, Chandigarh. She then completed her B.A. from the DAV College, Chandigarh.

== Career ==
=== Early work and expansion (2007–2019) ===
Gabbi made her film debut at the age of thirteen with a brief role in Imtiaz Ali's Hindi romantic comedy Jab We Met (2007), playing the cousin of Kareena Kapoor's character. She admitted to feeling uncertain about her future in the film industry while working on the picture, as she did not come from an acting family like Kapoor. After minor roles in Love Aaj Kal (2009), Mausam (2011), and Bittoo Boss (2012), Gabbi had her first lead role in the coming-of-age drama Sixteen (2013), portraying a teenager who enters a relationship with a significantly older man. Karan Anshuman of Mumbai Mirror commended Gabbi as "the standout" in a mediocre film. It emerged as a commercial failure, after which she professed to almost quitting acting in Hindi films due to persistent rejections.

Later that year, Gabbi made her debut into Punjabi cinema alongside Amrinder Gill and Yo Yo Honey Singh in the comedy film Tu Mera 22 Main Tera 22. It was a box-office success. Her subsequent roles in the Punjabi romances Ishq Brandy (2014) and Ishq Haazir Hai (2015) generally went unnoticed. In Bhale Manchi Roju, Gabbi expanded to Telugu cinema opposite Sudheer Babu as a woman abducted on her wedding day. Made on a shoestring budget, the film was a box-office success. In 2016, she made her debut into Tamil cinema with the romantic drama Maalai Naerathu Mayakkam opposite Balakrishna Kola. She was drawn to the character as it was a departure from the "chirpy" roles she had portrayed previously in her Punjabi films. Despite disliking the film's regressive themes, a critic for The New Indian Express labelled Gabbi "a talent to watch out for".

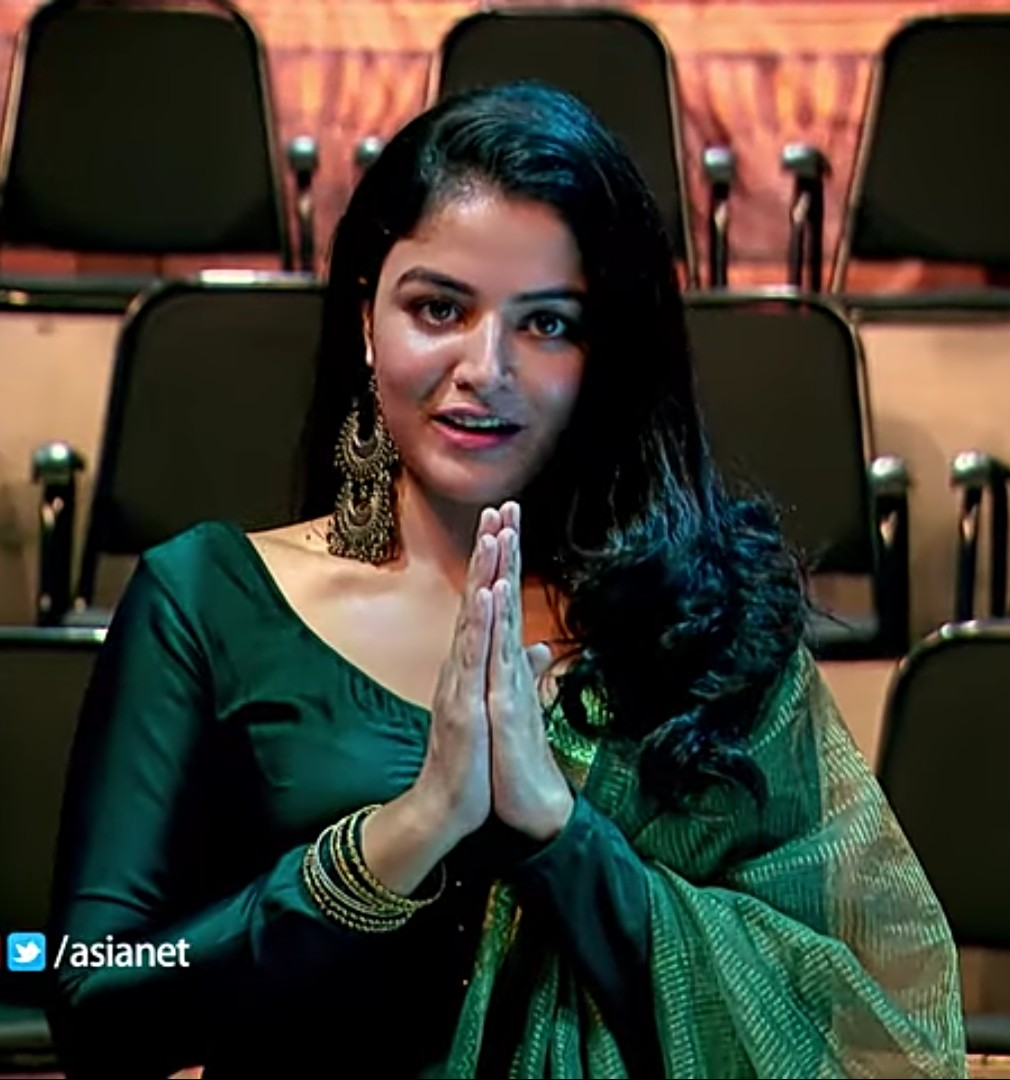
Gabbi in 2019

In 2017, she debuted into Malayalam cinema with the sports comedy Godha opposite Tovino Thomas. To prepare for her role as a Punjabi wrestler, she trained for the sport in Amritsar and lived with a coach for a month. In the film's climactic combat scene, Gabbi sustained physical injuries throughout her entire body. Her performance was positively received by critics including Firstpost's Anna MM Vetticad who described her as "luminous" and appreciated her emulation of a professional wrestler's mannerisms. Godha emerged as a sleeper hit at the box-office. Gabbi ended the year with the commercially successful Punjabi spiritual sequel Nikka Zaildar 2, for which she earned her first nomination for Best Actress (Critics) at the Punjabi Filmfare Awards. The romantic comedy Parahuna, co-starring Kulwinder Billa, was Gabbi's sole 2018 release. It performed well commercially.

In 2019, Gabbi had five releases—four of which were Punjabi. She began the year as part of an ensemble that included Prithviraj Sukumaran and Mamta Mohandas in the Malayalam science fiction film 9. In a mixed review for Film Companion, Neelima Menon wrote that Gabbi was "scintillating as the mysterious stranger". She followed this with the unremarkable Punjabi features Nadhoo Khan and Dil Diyan Gallan. Gabbi next returned to the Nikka Zaildar franchise for its third instalment as a struggling poet caught in a love triangle with Ammy Virk and Sonia Kaur's characters. In a positive review of the film for The Tribune_{,} Gurnaaz Kaur was appreciative of the actress' presence in the film. It emerged as a commercial success. Doorbeen, a drama centred on the illegal drug trade in Punjab, featured Gabbi as the love interest of Ninja's character.

=== Critical recognition in streaming (2020–2023) ===
In Galwakdi (2020), Gabbi played a free-spirited woman who falls in love with a librarian (played by Tarsem Jassar) that struggles with obsessive–compulsive disorder. In 2021, she made her foray into streaming with the crime drama series Grahan in which she played Manu, a Sikh girl who becomes romantically involved with a Hindu boy (played by Anshuman Pushkar) during the 1984 anti-Sikh riots. Shweta Keshri of India Today wrote that Gabbi and Pushkar "do proper justice while bringing alive the 80s romance to screen", but The Quint's Shefali Deshpande bemoaned that Gabbi's "fake freckles and Instagram filter-like make up" detracted from the character's authenticity. Gabbi next returned to Hindi cinema after eight years with Kabir Khan's sports drama 83 starring Ranveer Singh. She featured in a supporting role as cricket player Madan Lal's wife; Gabbi acknowledged that her role was brief but chose to sign the film regardless out of admiration for Khan.

In 2022, Gabbi featured in two series—Mai: A Mother's Rage and Modern Love Mumbai— which were released on to Netflix and Amazon Prime Video, respectively. In the former, she played a mute girl whose mother (played by Sakshi Tanwar) investigates the circumstances surrounding her death. Gabbi admitted that the intense role took a significant emotional toll on her, and she often broke down crying after filming; however, she deemed it essential for the audience to experience such scenes that reflected reality. The Indian Express's Shubhra Gupta took note of her "eloquent use of sign language". In Vishal Bhardwaj's segment of the latter anthology series, she was cast as a young Gujarati woman navigating her relationship with an Indo-Chinese man (played by Meiyang Chang). She said that she was drawn to exploring a different culture through the character as her roles previously were mostly Punjabi. Reception to the series was generally favourable; Anuj Kumar of The Hindu wrote that the pair "fit effortlessly into their parts".

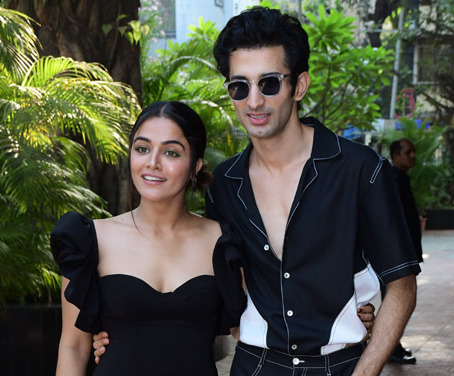
Gabbi with co-star Sidhant Gupta promoting Jubilee in 2023

The year 2023 proved to be a breakthrough for Gabbi, during which she appeared in six projects. She started the year in Bhardwaj's Fursat, a short film about a scientist (played by Ishaan Khatter) who discovers an artefact that transports him to the future. Filming for Fursat took place on the iPhone 14 Pro in collaboration with Apple Inc. Bhardwaj was initially sceptical of Gabbi's dancing abilities and considered simplifying the choreography for her but was impressed by her skills during the first rehearsal. In preparation, she learnt contemporary dance steps for her role in only nine days due to commitments to other projects. India Today's Roktim Rajpal took note of Gabbi's ability to "convey a lot through silence and expressions" and appreciated her chemistry with Khattar given the short duration of the film. However, reviewers of the film generally felt that the film prioritised showcasing the capabilities of the iPhone at the expense of the script's quality. The following week, Gabbi starred in the Punjabi crime drama Kali Jotta. It was met with critical acclaim upon release; Sukhpreet Kahlon of The Indian Express wrote that Gabbi brought "a carefree exuberance to her performance". Kali Jotta emerged as a major commercial success, ranking as the third highest-grossing Punjabi film of the year.

A turning point in Gabbi's career came in Vikramaditya Motwane's period series Jubilee, in which she appeared among an ensemble cast. Set against the emergence of the Hindi film industry in post-Partition India, she portrayed Niloufer, a headstrong courtesan with aspirations of becoming an actress. Motwane cast Gabbi in the role for her understanding of the nuance and emotion required by directors, along with her "gorgeous screen presence". To prepare for the song "Babuji Bhole Bhale", she drew inspiration from actresses Rekha, Aishwarya Rai and Priyanka Chopra. Upon release on to Amazon Prime Video, Jubilee received critical acclaim as did Gabbi's performance. Shilajit Mitra of The Hindu wrote that, "Gabbi cements her reputation as one of the most promising, and frankly stunning actresses of our time", and Saibal Chatterjee of NDTV was particularly impressed with the emotional depth she brought to the character. Critic Udita Jhunjhunwala observed that while her performances in Grahan, Mai: A Mother's Rage, and Modern Love Mumbai demonstrated her versatility to a certain extent, it was Jubilee that truly showcased her capabilities as an actor. She earned a nomination for Best Actress in a Drama Series at the Filmfare OTT Awards.

In May, Gabbi featured once again in the Modern Love franchise for its Tamil iteration, Modern Love Chennai; she cited her aspiration to collaborate with director Thiagarajan Kumararaja as the primary reason for accepting the project. She portrayed a woman tasked with helping her ex-boyfriend (played by PB) recover his memory following a car accident, the segment that Firstpost's Bhuvanesh Chandar considered the series' highlight. The following month, Gabbi reunited with Bhardwaj for their third collaboration in Charlie Chopra & the Mystery of Solang Valley, a thriller series adapted from Agatha Christie's The Sittaford Mystery. Based on the character of Trefusis, she described the role she described as "my most ambitious yet" and spent two months preparing for it. The series required her to break the fourth wall, a technique which she modelled after Phoebe Waller-Bridge's character in Fleabag. Citing the series as one of Bhardwaj's weaker projects, Mashable India's Sanyukta Thakare thought that the project's poor writing had constrained Gabbi's performance, but still felt that she showed potential in the series' more emotional scenes.

She gained further attention for her role as the wife of a spy (played by Ali Fazal) accused of dissent against the government in Bhardwaj's spy thriller Khufiya starring Tabu. When casting Gabbi for the film, Bhardwaj recalled her audition for his shelved adaptation of Midnight's Children. In a mixed review of the film, WION's Shomini Sen praised Gabbi for holding her own in the presence of established actors Tabu and Fazal. She earned her first award for Best Supporting Actress in a Web Original Film at the Filmfare OTT Awards and earned an additional nomination for Best Actress at the ceremony. Describing her frequent collaborations with Bhardwaj, she called it a "privilege" to work with him and revealed that he instilled confidence in her as an actor at a time when she considered quitting.

=== Transition to commercial cinema (2024–present) ===
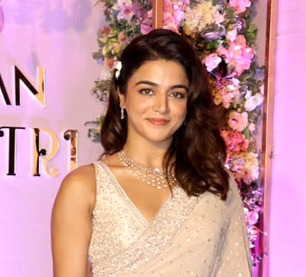
Gabbi in 2024

Gabbi next featured in the Hindi action film Baby John (2024) starring Varun Dhawan in the title role. She was initially hesitant in accepting the role as it was her first time performing action sequences. Sukanya Verma of Rediff.com bemoaned that "the charismatic Wamiqa Gabbi is wasted" in a poorly written role. It failed to recoup its estimated ₹1.8 billion (US$19 million) investment. The following year, Gabbi starred opposite Rajkummar Rao in the fantasy film Bhool Chuk Maaf (2025), about a man who is stuck in a time loop on his wedding day. The film faced several delays in its release due to the 2025 India–Pakistan conflict and issues between distributors. In a scathing review of the film for Scroll.in, Nandini Ramnath wrote that Gabbi was "a misfire as the sometimes coquettish, sometimes feisty, and all-times grating Titli". Against expectations, Bhool Chuk Maaf was as a successful financial venture.

Gabbi featured in three films in 2026, starting with the Hindi comedies Bhooth Bangla and Pati Patni Aur Woh Do. In the former, directed by Priyadarshan, she performed her own stunts. Critics took issue with the 32-year age gap between Gabbi and her co-star Akshay Kumar. Shubhra Gupta was particularly critical of Gabbi's "cringey romantic track", which she considered the film's weakest aspect, citing her "forced pouting". Mudassar Aziz's Pati Patni Aur Woh Do tells the story of a man (played by Ayushmann Khurrana) who becomes entangled in a comedy of errors after his wife (Gabbi) suspects him of having affairs with two other women (played by Sara Ali Khan and Rakul Preet Singh). Reviewing the film for India Today, Vineeta Kumar found Gabbi's performance notably more restrained than her recent work.

She followed this by starring opposite Lokesh Kanagaraj in DC, a romantic action adaptation of Sarat Chandra Chattopadhyay's novel Devdas that reimagines the pair as a Bonnie and Clyde–style duo. To prepare for the film, Gabbi worked with a dialogue coach to learn the Madurai dialect of Tamil. Her performance earned acclaim from critics, with the Indian edition of The Hollywood Reporter writing that the actress "expertly mixes up the wide-eyed innocence of a little girl with that of the cold brutality of a woman who has been defeated by the world, without it ever feeling like two different characters". Gabbi's three releases that year helped expand her presence in commercial cinema, with Bhooth Bangla and DC ranking among the highest-grossing films of 2026 in their respective languages.

==== Upcoming projects ====
Gabbi has several upcoming projects across multiple languages. In Tamil cinema, she will star in the fantasy film Genie alongside Jayam Ravi and the romance Iravaakaalam opposite S.J. Suryah, which has been completed since 2018 but is yet to be picked up for distribution. In Punjabi, she will appear in the romantic drama Kikli with Mandy Takhar and Jobanpreet Singh. In Malayalam, she will appear in the action film Tiki Taka alongside Asif Ali. In Telugu, she will feature in the spy thriller G2 with Adivi Sesh and Emraan Hashmi. She will also star in several upcoming Hindi projects, including Vikas Bahl’s comedy Dil Ka Darwaaza Khol Na Darling, alongside Jaya Bachchan and Siddhant Chaturvedi; Raj & DK’s Netflix fantasy miniseries Rakt Brahmand: The Bloody Kingdom, co-starring Samantha Ruth Prabhu, Aditya Roy Kapur, and Ali Fazal; the romantic drama Kuku Ki Kundali, opposite Bhuvan Bam; and the biographical courtroom drama Prahaar: The Untold Story of Ujjwal Nikam, starring Rajkummar Rao.

== In the media ==
In 2024, the Korean skincare brand Innisfree appointed Gabbi as its first-ever Indian brand ambassador. That same year, she was also named the new face of Softline, the womenswear brand under Rupa & Co.

== Filmography ==
Key
†	Denotes films that have not yet been released

=== Films ===
Year	Title	Role	Language	Notes	Ref.
2007	Jab We Met	Geet and Roop's cousin	Hindi		
2009	Love Aaj Kal	Background dancer	Hindi		
2011	Mausam	Lala Durgadas's daughter	Hindi		
2012	Bittoo Boss	Nikki	Hindi		
2013	Sixteen	Tanisha	Hindi		
2013	Tu Mera 22 Main Tera 22	Nikky	Punjabi		
2014	Ishq Brandy	Kimmi	Punjabi		
2015	Ishq Haazir Hai	Simar	Punjabi		
2015	Bhale Manchi Roju	Sitha	Telugu	Credited monoymously as Wamiqa	
2016	Maalai Nerathu Mayakkam	Manoja	Tamil	Credited monoymously as Wamiqa	
2017	Godha	Adithi Singh	Malayalam	Credited monoymously as Wamiqa	
2017	Nikka Zaildar 2	Saawan Kaur	Punjabi		
2018	Parahuna	Maano	Punjabi		
2019	Nine	Eva	Malayalam		
2019	Nadhoo Khan	Jindo	Punjabi		
2019	Dil Diyan Gallan	Natasha	Punjabi		
2019	Nikka Zaildar 3	Palpreet	Punjabi		
2019	Doorbeen	Noor	Punjabi		
2020	Galwakdi	Amberdeep Kaur	Punjabi		
2021	83	Annu Lal	Hindi		
2023	Kali Jotta	Anant	Punjabi		
2023	Khufiya	Charu Ravi Mohan	Hindi	Netflix film	
2024	Tabaah	Raavi	Punjabi		
2024	Baby John	Tara / Adhira Verman IPS	Hindi		
2025	Bhool Chuk Maaf	Titli Mishra	Hindi		
2026	Bhooth Bangla	Priya / Chitra	Hindi	Dual role	
2026	Pati Patni Aur Woh Do	Aparna Trivedi	Hindi		
2026	DC	Chandra	Tamil		
2026	Prahaar: The Untold Story of Ujjwal Nikam	Jyoti Nikam	Hindi		
2026	G2 †	Mahalakshmi Naagin	Telugu	Filming	
2026	Tiki Taka †	TBA	Malayalam	Completed	
2026	Kikli †	TBA	Punjabi	Completed	
2026	Iravaakaalam †	TBA	Tamil	Completed	
2026	Genie †	TBA	Tamil	Filming	
2026	Dil Ka Darwaaza Khol Na Darling †	TBA	Hindi	Filming	
2026	Kuku Ki Kundli †	TBA	Hindi	Filming	

=== Short Films ===
Year	Title	Role(s)	Language	Note(s)	Ref.
2023	Fursat	Diya Srivastav	Hindi		

=== Television ===
Year	Title	Role	Language	Notes	Ref.
2021	Grahan	Manjeet Kaur Chhabra / Manu	Hindi		
2022	Mai: A Mother's Rage	Supriya Chaudhary	Hindi		
2022	Modern Love Mumbai	Megha	Hindi		
2023	Jubilee	Nilofer Qureshi	Hindi		
2023	Modern Love Chennai	Sam	Tamil		
2023	Charlie Chopra & the Mystery of Solang Valley	Charlie Chopra	Hindi		
TBA	Rakt Brahmand: The Bloody Kingdom †	TBA	Hindi	Filming	

=== Music video appearances ===
Year	Song	Language(s)	Singer	Ref.
2017	"Manak Di Kali"	Punjabi	Ranjit Bawa	
2017	"Angreji Wali Madam"	Punjabi	Kulwinder Billa, Shipra Goyal	
2018	"Teri Khaamiyan"	Punjabi	Akhil	
2018	"100 Percent"	Punjabi	Garry Sandhu	
2020	"Kajla"	Punjabi	Tarsem Jassar	
2021	"Kade Kade"	Punjabi	Ammy Virk	
2021	"Tere Laare"	Punjabi	Afsana Khan, Amrit Maan	
2024	"Ittefaq"	Hindi	Siddhant Chaturvedi, OAFF, Savera	

== Awards and nominations ==
Year	Award	Category	Work	Result	Ref.
2018	Filmfare Awards Punjabi	Best Actress (Critics)	Nikka Zaildar 2	Nominated	
2023	Filmfare OTT Awards	Best Actress in a Drama Series	Jubilee	Nominated	
2024	Filmfare OTT Awards	Best Actress in a Web Original Film	Khufiya	Nominated	
2024	Filmfare OTT Awards	Best Supporting Actress in a Web Original Film	Khufiya	Won	
