= Saak (film) =

2019 Punjabi language romantic drama film

- Theatrical release poster
- Directed by: Kamaljit Singh
- Written by: Kamaljit Singh
- Produced by: Jatinder Jay Minhas; Rupinder Preet Minhas
- Starring: Jobanpreet Singh; Mandy Takhar; Mukul Dev
- Cinematography: Karthik Ashokan
- Music by: Gurmeet Singh; Sandeep Saxena
- Production companies: Minhas Films Pvt Ltd; Minhas Lawyers LLP Presentation
- Distributed by: White Hill Studios
- Release date: 6 September 2019
- Running time: 121 minutes
- Country: India
- Language: Punjabi

Saak (transl. Nuptial) is a 2019 Indian Punjabi-language romantic drama film written and directed by Kamaljit Singh. The film is produced by Jatinder Jay Minhas, Rupinder Preet Minhas, under banners Minhas Films Pvt Ltd and Minhas Lawyers LLP Presentation. It stars Jobanpreet Singh, and Mandy Takhar and is set against the backdrop of 1947, it follows the story of an army man who falls in love with a girl whose parents don't like an army man for their son-in-law. It was released on 6 September 2019.

== Plot ==
The film revolves around the love story of Fauji Karam Singh and Chann Kaur. They want to get married but the Chann's father detests the idea of marrying his daughter to a soldier owing to previous martyr of his brother in law and the plight of his widowed sister. However the couple marry and hoodwink the girl's sire and the entire village by framing a secret mission story. When the big revelation happens, the war has already started and Karam decides to leave for the country's sake. Chann's father decides that her vidai will only take place when Karam returns. It is shown that he has gone missing and doesn't return but later it is revealed that he is alive and happily brings his bride home.

== Cast ==
- Mandy Takhar as Chann Kaur
- Jobanpreet Singh as Karam Singh
- Mukul Dev as Bhola
- Prithvi Raaj Sidhu as Karam's Nephew
- Sonpreet Jawandha as Karam's Brother
- Gurdeep Baath as Chann Kaur's Friend

== Release ==
The official teaser was released by White Hill Music on 6 August 2019. The official trailer of the film was released by White Hill Music on 15 August 2019.

The film has been certified with a runtime of 121 mins by British Board of Film Classification and was theatrically released on 6 September 2019.

=== Home Media Release ===
Saak is available for streaming on the Chaupal OTT platform.

=== Critical response ===
Gurnaaz Kaur of The Tribune gave two out of five stars and opined that the depiction of vintage Punjabi culture stood out in the film. Gurnaaz praised the performance of Jobanpreet, and said, "It would be fair to say that he carries the film on his shoulders." Criticising slowness of plot, the dialogues and acting, the critic felt that climax was predictable and not exciting. Gurnaaz concluded, "Saak could have been a better film if it wasn't so stretched and if its actors were utilised well."

== Soundtrack ==
Saak

Soundtrack album by Onkar Minhas, Qaistrax
- Released: 6 September 2019
- Recorded: 2019
- Genre: Feature film soundtrack
- Length: 24:08
- Language: Punjabi
- Label: White Hill Music
External audio
- Audio song on YouTube

The songs are composed by Onkar Minhas and Qaistrax on lyrics of Veet Baljit and Kartar Kamal.

Track list
No.	Title	Lyrics	Music	Singer(s)	Length
1.	"Ve Sajjna"	Veet Baljit	Onkar Minhas	Kailash Kher	5:05
2.	"Gedha Gidhe vich"	Kartar Kamal	Onkar Minhas	Mannat Noor	4:24
3.	"Chan Ve"	Kartar Kamal	Onkar Minhas	Harshdeep Kaur	5:31
4.	"Gabru di Gall"	Veet Baljit	Qaistrax	Veet Baljit, Shipra Goyal	3:19
5.	"Tappe"	Kartar Kamal	Onkar Minhas	Kartar Kamal	5:49
Total length:					24:08
