= Dulla Bhatti (2016 film) =

- Directed by: Minar Malhotra
- Written by: Minar Malhotra
- Produced by: Amitansh, Mani Dhaliwal, Naman Gupta, Shakti
- Starring: Binnu Dhillon; Aman Hundal; Sardar Sohi; B.N. Sharma; Dev Kharoud; Amar Noorie
- Cinematography: Purushotam Chaudhary
- Edited by: Minar Malhotra
- Music by: Laddi Gill
- Release date: 10 June 2016
- Country: India
- Language: Punjabi
- Box office: ₹3.50 crore (US$410,000)

Dulla Bhatti is a 2016 Indian Punjabi-language film directed by Minar Malhotra and starring Binnu Dhillon, Aman Hundal, Sardar Sohi, B.N. Sharma, Amar Noorie, Dev Kharoud, Nirmal Rishi, and Malkit Rauni. The casting of the movie is by Kamz Kreationz and Shaifali Srivastav. The movie was inspired by the story of Dulla Bhatti.

== Cast ==
- Binnu Dhillon as Dara
- Aman Hundal
- Sardar Sohi
- B.N Sharma
- Dev Kharoud
- Amar Noorie
- Malkit Rauni
- Nirmal Rishi
- Amitansh
- Naman Gupta
- Mani Dhaliwal
- Anmol Verma
