= Alfaaz =

Indian musician

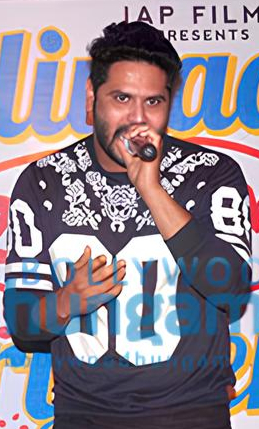
- Alfaaz in 2015

Background information
- Born: Chandigarh, India
- Origin: Punjab, India
- Occupations: Singer, actor, and lyricist
- Years active: 2010–present
- Formerly of: Mafia Mundeer
- Spouse: Navjot Kaur (m. 2019)

Alfaaz is the stage name of an Indian singer, lyricist and writer from Chandigarh, Punjab. Alfaaz was also a former member of Mafia Mundeer, a platform pioneered by Yo Yo Honey Singh.

== Career ==
In 2011, Alfaaz released his debut album, Alfaaz – The Boy Next Door, for which Honey Singh composed the music.

In 2013, he released another track with Singh titled "Bebo", which had a rap segment performed by Honey Singh.

In 2015, the duo again came together for the track "Birthday Bash", for the Bollywood film Dilliwali Zaalim Girlfriend.

in 2016, he released track with Preet Hundal, titled "Sexo", with T-Series, whose music is also composed by Preet Hundal.

He released another song "Kalley Rehen De", while also acting as the lyricist for the song "Call Aundi" for the soundtrack EP of Honey Singh's Punjabi film, Zorawar.

The long-awaited duo again reunited in 2023, for the single "Tell Me Once", after Singh's recovery and return from a musical hiatus due to bipolar disorder with psychotic symptoms. The song and its music video was critically acclaimed.

In May 2025, the company T-Series dropped the track "Laal Pari" for the Bollywood film Housefull 5, which featured Honey Singh. Alfaaz and Singh both wrote the track, with Singh also being the composer. The track crossed 21 million views in 24 hours.

== Personal life ==
According to reports, Alfaaz was admitted to the hospital on 1 October 2022 after being hit by a car. He was coming out of a dhaba in Mohali after having dinner with his three friends, namely, Gurpreet, Teji and Kuljit. He got into an argument with a man named Vicky, and subsequently, attacked him. Alfaaz was later hospitalised after being attacked. Honey Singh took to Twitter the next day, to reveal that he is "out of danger".

== Filmography ==
=== Movies ===
Year	Film	Roles	Notes
2013	Jatt Airways	Harry	
2014	Ishq Brandy	Tejbir Cheema	PTC Punjabi Film Award for Best Lyricist – Alfaaz for Hajj PTC Punjabi Film Award for Best Playback Singer (Male) – Alfaaz for Hajj
2015	Dilliwali Zaalim Girlfriend	Himself	Cameo appearance in song "Birthday Bash"
2018	Vadda Kalakaar	Makkan	

As Music Director

Year	Song	Singer	Lyrics	Role	Notes
2025	"Scarface"	Rawkey	Rawkey	Director and composer	From the album THE CHOSEN ONE Debut as Music Director
2025	"WHISTLES"	Abhitej	Alfaaz	Director and composer	

== Discography ==
=== Albums ===
Title	Producer(s)	Writer(s)	Label	Language	Release date
Alfaaz – The Boy Next Door	Yo Yo Honey Singh	Alfaaz	Speed Records	Punjabi	2011
Unfollow The Fear		Alfaaz		Punjabi	TBA

==== Released through Famebox Studios Label ====
Title	Artist	Producer	Writer(s)	Language	Release date	Notes
THE CHOSEN ONE	Rawkey	Bass Yogi	Rawkey	Punjabi	2025	Debut album of Rawkey Alfaaz's debut as music director

=== Singles ===
Track	Year	Artist(s)	Music	Music label	Notes
"Haye Mera Dil"	2011	Alfaaz, Yo Yo Honey Singh	Yo Yo Honey Singh	Speed Records	From the album Alfaaz – The Boy Next Door
"Yaar Baathere"	2011	Alfaaz, Yo Yo Honey Singh	Yo Yo Honey Singh	Speed Records	From the album Alfaaz – The Boy Next Door
"Chamkila V/s Justine Bieber"	2012	Alfaaz, Yo Yo Honey Singh	Yo Yo Honey Singh	Speed Records	
'Bebo"	2013	Alfaaz, Yo Yo Honey Singh	Yo Yo Honey Singh	Yo Yo Honey Singh	
"Fantasy"	2013	Alfaaz Featuring Yo Yo Honey Singh	Yo Yo Honey Singh	Shemaroo Entertainment	From the soundtrack album of Jatt Airways
"Sanu Hai Teri Lorh"	2013	Alfaaz, Simran Kaur	Yo Yo Honey Singh	Shemaroo Entertainment	From the soundtrack album of Jatt Airways
"Putt Jatt Da"	2015	Alfaaz	Preet Hundal	Acme Muzic	
"Birthday Bash"	2015	Yo Yo Honey Singh Featuring Alfaaz	Yo Yo Honey Singh	T-Series	From the soundtrack album of Dilliwaali Zaalim Girlfriend
"Gangster Love"	2015	Alfaaz,Kamal Khaira,Preet Hundal	Preet Hundal	Panj-aab Records	
"Sexo"	2016	Alfaaz, Preet Hundal	Preet Hundal	T-Series	
"Kalley Rehen De"	2016	Alfaaz	Yo Yo Honey Singh	T-Series	From the soundtrack album of Zorawar
"Piche Piche "	2018	Shipra Goyal, Alfaaz	Intense	Eros International Media Ltd	
Vadda Kalakaar	2018	Alfaaz,Gurlez Akhtar	Mofusion Studios	T-Series	From the soundtrack album of Vadda Kalakaar
"Watsaap"	2019	Alfaaz	Mofusion Studios	T-Series	
"Your Dad"	2019	Alfaaz,Singga	Mofusion Studios	Inka Productions	
"Shartaan"	2020	Alfaaz,Jaggi Amargarh	Mofusion Studios	Inka Productions	
"Lockdown"	2020	Alfaaz	Mofusion Studios	Inka Productions	
"Fake Gangster"	2020	Alfaaz	DJ Rude	T-Series	
"Memories"	2020	Alfaaz Featuring Simar Kaur	Mofusion Studios	Saga Music	
"Tell Me Once "	2023	Alfaaz,Yo Yo Honey Singh		Yo Yo Honey Singh	
"Compro"	2025	Alfaaz,Yo Yo Honey Singh		T-Series	Single from the album 51 Glorious Days

Songwriting credits

Track	Year	Artist(s)	Music	Lyrics	Music label	Albums
"The Lions Of Punjab"	2011	Diljit Dosanjh, Honey Singh	Yo Yo Honey Singh	Bachan Badill, Alfaaz, Yo Yo Honey Singh	Speed Records	From the soundtrack of Tu Mera 22 Main Tera 22
"Main Naiyo Jaana"	2012	Amrinder Gill	Yo Yo Honey Singh	Alfaaz	Speed Records	From the soundtrack of Tu Mera 22 Main Tera 22
"Baby This Baby That"	2012	Mika Singh	Yo Yo Honey Singh	Alfaaz	Speed Records	From the soundtrack of Tu Mera 22 Main Tera 22
"Wakh"	2012	Amrinder Gill	Yo Yo Honey Singh	Alfaaz	Speed Records	From the soundtrack of Tu Mera 22 Main Tera 22
"Dance To the Beat"	2012	Amrinder Gill	Yo Yo Honey Singh	Alfaaz	Speed Records	From the soundtrack of Tu Mera 22 Main Tera 22
"Maula Jaane"	2012	Amrinder Gill	Yo Yo Honey Singh	Alfaaz	Speed Records	From the soundtrack of Tu Mera 22 Main Tera 22
"Siftaan"	2012	Money Aujla Featuring Yo Yo Honey Singh	Yo Yo Honey Singh	Alfaaz	Speed Records	From the album Siftaan
"High Heels"	2012	Jaz Dhami Featuring Yo Yo Honey Singh	Yo Yo Honey Singh	Alfaaz	Speed Records	
"This Party Getting Hot"	2012	Jazzy B, Yo Yo Honey Singh	Yo Yo Honey Singh	Alfaaz	Jazzy B Records	
"Mehrma"	2014	Sam Sandhu Featuring Yo Yo Honey Singh	Yo Yo Honey Singh	Alfaaz	Sony Music India	
"Call Aundi"	2016	Yo Yo Honey Singh	Yo Yo Honey Singh	Alfaaz,Yo Yo Honey Singh, Lil Golu	T-Series	From the soundtrack album Zorawar
"4 By 4"	2018	Shipra Goyal	Ikwinder Singh	Alfaaz	T-Series	
"Bulgari"	2019	Kulwinder Billa & Shipra Goyal	Dr Zeus	Alfaaz	Speed Records	
"Stranger"	2020	Diljit Dosanjh Featuring Simar Kaur	Mofusion Studios	Alfaaz	Saga Music	
"Care Ni Karda"	2020	Sweetaj Brar, Yo Yo Honey Singh	Yo Yo Honey Singh	Alfaaz, Yo Yo Honey Singh, Hommie Dilliwala	T-Series	From the soundtrack album of Chhalaang
"Attach"	2023	Shipra Goyal	Ikky	Alfaaz	Blue Beat Studios	
"Barsaa To Me Bhi"	2023	Arsh Malik		Alfaaz		
"Kashmir"	2023	Arsh Malik		Alfaaz		
"Tasveeran"	2024	Amrinder Gill	Lowkey	Alfaaz	Rhythm Boyz	From the Daaru Na Peenda Hove
"Laal Pari"	2025	Yo Yo Honey Singh, Simar Kaur	Yo Yo Honey Singh	Alfaaz, Yo Yo Honey Singh	T-Series	From the soundtrack album of Housefull 5
"War Anthem"	2025	Ninja, Wazir Patar	GAG Studioz	Alfaaz	Ninja	
