= Dilliwali Zaalim Girlfriend =

2015 film by Japinder Kaur

Dilliwaali Zaalim Girlfriend
- Film Poster
- Directed by: Japinder Kaur
- Written by: Manu Rishi
- Produced by: Manjeet Kaur; Tarnpreet Singh
- Starring: Divyenndu; Jackie Shroff; Prachi Mishra; Pradhuman Singh
- Cinematography: Subbaiah Kuttappa
- Edited by: Cheragh Todiwala
- Music by: Yo Yo Honey Singh; Meet Bros Anjjan; Tigerstyle; Dr. Zeus; Jatinder Shah; Millind Gaba
- Production company: JAP Films
- Release date: 20 March 2015
- Country: India
- Languages: Hindi; Punjabi

Dilliwaali Zaalim Girlfriend (transl. My Delhiite cruel girlfriend) is a Hindi romantic comedy film directed by Japinder Kaur and produced by Tarnpreet Singh and Manjeet Kaur under JAP Films. The film features Divyenndu, Jackie Shroff, Prachi Mishra and Ira Dubey in lead roles. The film was released on 20 March 2015.

== Plot ==
Dhruv (Divyenndu), an aspirant IAS officer, takes a private loan from a company to buy a car to woo the girl he loves, Sakshi (Prachi Mishra). Soon enough, life turns upside down for him as he is unable to pay back the loan, and the car is seized. From then on, Dhruv encounters today's materialistic girls (where the money comes above love), the finance company, the system, and a hardened criminal named Minocha (Jackie Shroff).

== Cast ==
- Divyenndu as Dhruv
- Jackie Shroff as Manocha
- Prachi Mishra as Sakshi
- Ira Dubey as Nimmy
- Pradhuman Singh as Happy Singh
- Natalia Kapchuk – Special appearance in song "Tipsy Hogai"
- Yo Yo Honey Singh – Special appearance in song "Birthday Bash"
- Alfaaz – Special appearance in song "Birthday Bash"
- Jazzy B and Hard Kaur – Special appearance in song "Zalim Dilli"

== Critical response ==
Johnson Thomas of Free Press Journal described the film's setup as promising, but criticised the execution of the story as "imminently predictable and unexciting".

== Soundtrack ==
The soundtrack for the film is produced by T-Series. This a complete Hip Hop album. There is a special number by Yo Yo Honey Singh titled Birthday Bash and by Dr. Zeus titled Tipsy Hogai. Zaalim Dilli is a song by Jazzy B featuring Hard Kaur. Other album artists include Arijit Singh, Sunidhi Chauhan, Kamal Khan, Agni, Alfaaz, Millind Gaba, and Rajveer Singh.

Diliwaali Zaalim Girlfriend

Soundtrack album
- Released: 9 March 2015
- Genre: Film soundtrack
- Length: 38:16
- Language: Hindi
- Label: T-Series
- Director: Yo Yo Honey Singh, Dr. Zeus, Tigerstyle, Jatinder Shah, Meet Bros.
- Producer: T-Series

No.	Title	Lyrics	Music	Singer(s)	Length
1.	"Birthday Bash"	Alfaaz	Yo Yo Honey Singh	Yo Yo Honey Singh, Alfaaz	4:12
2.	"Tipsy Hogai"	Zora Randhawa, Manvi Bains	Dr. Zeus	Rajveer Singh, Miss Pooja	3:30
3.	"Zaalim Dilli"	Bunty Bains	Tigerstyle	Jazzy B, Hard Kaur	3:34
4.	"Tere Liye"	Indeep Bakshi	Indeep Bakshi	Indeep Bakshi	4:56
5.	"Janib" (Duet Version)	Kumaar	Jatinder Shah	Arijit Singh, Sunidhi Chauhan	5:43
6.	"Janib" (Female Version)	Kumaar	Jatinder Shah	Sunidhi Chauhan	5:10
7.	"Meri Marzi Teri Raza"	Kumaar	Meet Bros Anjjan	Meet Bros Anjjan, Agni	5:48
8.	"Saddi Dilli"	Millind Gaba	Millind Gaba	Millind Gaba	2:44
9.	"Maa De Dandeya"	Kumaar	Jassi Katyal	Jassi Katyal	2:39
Total length:					38:16
