= Munde Kamaal De =

2015 Indian Punjabi film directed by Amit Prasher

- Directed by: Amit Prasher
- Written by: Naresh Kathooria
- Produced by: Prem Parkash Gupta; Randheer Singh Dheera, Amarpreet Singh Heera, D. P. Jain
- Starring: Amrinder Gill; Yuvraj Hans; Binnu Dhillon; Mandy Takhar; Prabhjeet Kaur; Sufi Gulati
- Cinematography: Anshul Chobey
- Edited by: Devinder Virdi
- Music by: Farzan Faaiz
- Production company: SRD Motion Pictures
- Distributed by: Om Jee Cineworld
- Release date: 21 August 2015
- Country: India
- Language: Punjabi

Munde Kamaal De is a 2015 Indian Punjabi-language comedy film directed by Amit Prasher and written by Naresh Kathooria The film was produced by Prem Parkash Gupta, starring Amrinder Gill, Yuvraj Hans, Binnu Dhillon and Mandy Takhar in the lead. The film was released on 21 August 2015. The movie was produced under the banner of SRD Motion Pictures. Munde Kamaal De revolves around three characters who are blind, deaf and mute. It revolves around their love lives and the troubles brought upon them by their disabilities.

== Cast ==
- Amrinder Gill as Vikram
- Yuvraj Hans as Rocky
- Binnu Dhillon as Tinku
- Prabhjeet Kaur as Kajal
- Mandy Takhar as Sonia
- Jaswinder Bhalla as Balwant Singh Sidhu
- B.N. Sharma as Sikander
- Karamjit Anmol as Bunty
- Avtar Gill as Tiwana
- Raghveer Boli as Babli

== Release ==
The film was released 21 August 2015.

=== Home Media Release ===
The film can be streamed on the Chaupal OTT platform.

== Soundtrack ==
The music was composed by Farzan Faaiz, Jaison Thind, Jassi Katyal, Gurmoh and released by Moviebank-L.

Munde Kamaal De

Soundtrack album by Farzan Faaiz, Jaison Thind, Jassi Katyal, Gurmoh
- Released: 21 August 2015
- Recorded: 2015
- Genre: Soundtrack
- Length: 23:53
- Label: Moviebank-L
- Producers: Farzan Faaiz; Jaison Thind; Jassi Katyal; Gurmoh

Track list
No.	Title	Lyrics	Music	Singer(s)	Length
1.	"Bejurm Dil"	Faaiz Anwar	Farzan Faaiz	Kamal Khan	5:01
2.	"Diljaniya"	Kuldeep Kandiara	Jaison Thind	Karamjit Anmol	6:00
3.	"Naina Baawre Unplugged"	Vinder Nathu Majra	Jassi Katyal	Nikhil	4:20
4.	"Naina Baawre"	Vinder Nathu Majra	Jassi Katyal	Shafqat Amanat Ali	5:40
5.	"Munde Kamaal De"	Vinder Nathu Majra	Gurmoh	Gurmoh, Manna Mand	2:52
Total length:					23:53

== Reception ==
=== Critical response ===
ABP Sanjha also gave positive review to the movie. Divya Pal of CNN-IBN gave ratings of 1.5/5 to the film. Myballewood.com gave it 3.5/5.

== Box office ==
The film had poor opening at the domestic box office as its first week is netted around 1.94 crores.
