= Ishq Brandy =

- Directed by: Amit Prasher
- Written by: Rupinder Inderjit
- Produced by: Future Cine Vision
- Starring: Roshan Prince; Binnu Dhillon; Shobhita Rana; Alfaaz; Japji Khaira; Wamiqa Gabbi; B.N. Sharma; Karamjit Anmol; Shivendra Mahal
- Edited by: Manish More
- Music by: Yo Yo Honey Singh & Sachh
- Release date: 21 February 2014
- Country: India
- Language: Punjabi

Ishq Brandy is a Punjabi comedy film directed by Amit Prasher, Starring Roshan Prince, Binnu Dhillon, Shobhita Rana, Alfaaz and Japji Khaira. The movie is produced under banner Future Cine Vision. The film's Music was given by Yo Yo Honey Singh and Sachh & Lyrics by Alfaaz. Ishq Brandy was released on 21 February 2014.

== Cast ==
- Alfaaz as Tejbir Cheema
- Roshan Prince as Gura
- Binnu Dhillon as Preetam
- Wamiqa Gabbi as Kimmi
- Japji Khaira as Simran
- Shobhita Rana as Chandani
- B. N. Sharma as King Don
- Balkran Singh
- Gurpreet Kaur
- Navjot Singh
- Karamjit Anmol
- Shivendra Mahal

== Crew ==
- Director : Amit Prasher
- Production House : Future Cine Vision
- Producers : Mahesh Garg, Satish Aggarwal, Randhir Singh Dheera, Dimple Mittal, Babbu Mittal
- Co-Produced By : Amit Mann, Deepak Kumar, Rajinder Sharma
- DOP : Jalesh Oberoi
- Written By : Rupinder Inderjit
- Editor : Manish More
- Action : Abbas Ali Moghul
- Music : Yo Yo Honey Singh & Sachh
- Assistant Directors : Amarjit Singh, Rohit Kumar, Ojaswee Sharma, Rahul Anand, Vivek Saini, Devinder Virdi, Sandeep Punj

== Reception ==
Monita Sharma from Ballewood.in, a website on Punjabi film industry, wrote, "Ishq Brandy is a light-hearted entertainer that was desperately needed to end the lull phase that Punjabi cinema had been going through for some time."

== Awards ==
Nominated

- PTC Punjabi Film Award for Best Background Score - Salil Amrute
- PTC Punjabi Film Award for Best Cinematography - Jalesh Oberoi
- PTC Punjabi Film Award for Best Lyricist - Alfaaz for Hajj
- PTC Punjabi Film Award for Best Playback Singer (Male) - Alfaaz for Hajj
- PTC Punjabi Film Award for Best Supporting Actress - Wamiqa Gabbi
- PTC Punjabi Film Award for Best Actor - Roshan Prince
