= Saadi Wakhri Hai Shaan =

- Directed by: Gurbir Singh Grewal
- Screenplay by: Inder Roop Singh Ghuman
- Story by: Inder Roop Singh Ghuman
- Produced by: Inder Roop Singh Ghuman, Sukhpal Singh Mangat, Bikramjit Singh Gill
- Starring: Sangram Singh; Mandy Takhar; Gurpreet Ratol; Mannu Sandhu; Binnu Dhillon
- Cinematography: Nadeem Khan
- Edited by: Sukhbeer
- Music by: Dilpreet Bhatia
- Production company: Vibgyor Creations
- Distributed by: Batra Showbiz
- Release date: 12 October 2012 (Worldwide Release)
- Running time: 135 minutes
- Country: India
- Language: Punjabi

Saadi Wakhri Hai Shaan is a 2012 Punjabi movie directed by Gurbir Singh Grewal and written by Inder Roop Singh Ghuman. It is produced by Inder Roop Singh Ghuman, Dr. Sukhpal Singh Mangat and Bikramjit Singh Gill under the banner of Vibgyor Creations. The star cast includes Sangram Singh, Mandy Takhar, Gurpreet Ratol, Mannu Sandhu Binnu Dhillon, Rana Ranbir and Harpal Singh. Music has been given by Dilpreet Bhatia. Screenplay and lyrics are also written by Inder Roop Singh Ghuman.

== Resources ==
- http://www.punjabnewsline.com/news/Starcast-of-__-Saadi-vakhri-hai-shaan___-interacts-with-students.html
- http://www.rottentomatoes.com/m/saadi_wakhri_hai_shaan/
