= Tu Mera 22 Main Tera 22 =

2013 film by Amit Prasher

- Poster
- Directed by: Amit Prasher
- Written by: Dheeraj Rattan
- Produced by: J.S. Kataria; Gunbir Singh Sidhu; Hansraj Railhan; Pooja Singh
- Starring: Amrinder Gill; Yo Yo Honey Singh; Mandy Takhar; Wamiqa Gabbi
- Cinematography: Dheeraj Ratan
- Edited by: Manish More
- Music by: Yo Yo Honey Singh
- Distributed by: White Hill Studios
- Release date: 25 January 2013
- Country: India
- Language: Punjabi

Tu Mera 22 Main Tera 22 (English translation: You're my brother & I'm your brother) is a Punjabi comedy film directed by Amit Prasher. The film features Amrinder Gill and Yo Yo Honey Singh in the lead roles as two spoiled rich brothers, alongside Mandy Takhar. The film released on 25 January 2013, and did good business at the box office, completing verdict of "semi-hit".

== Plot ==
The story unfolds in Melbourne with two spoiled rich brothers and best friends Robby (Amrinder Gill), and Rolly (Honey Singh). Their businessman father is worried about the future of his irresponsible sons so he strikes a deal with them, by throwing the brats out of his house and sending them to Punjab so that they can understand the realities of life and importance of their roots and heritage. The film is about how these two spoiled brothers arrive in Punjab and learn to live with the struggle, whilst being challenged by their father to come up with Rs. 3 million in 30 days in order to inherit his wealth. Otherwise the wealth would be transferred to charity which would be maintained by their father's secretary.

== Cast ==
Mazhar Hussain Mangnejo as Hussain Khan

- Amrinder Gill as Robby
- Yo Yo Honey Singh as Rolly
- Mandy Takhar as Simmy
- Wamiqa Gabbi as Mini
- Raghveer Boli as Raju
- Binnu Dhillon as Sher Singh
- Mukesh Vohra as Pinku
- Shavinder Mahal
- B.N. Sharma

== Release ==
Tu Mera 22 and Main Tera 22 was released in the theatres on 25 January 2013.

=== Home Media Release ===
The film is available on the Chaupal Ott platform for the digital audience.

== Soundtrack ==
Music of this movie was released on 15 December 2012

Tu Mera 22 Main Tera 22 (Music Album)

Soundtrack album by Honey Singh, Amrinder Gill, Mika Singh, Master Saleem
- Released: 15 December 2012
- Genre: Film soundtrack
- Length: 0:27:42
- Label: Speed Records
- Producers: Ruby & Dinesh

=== Track list ===
All lyrics are written by Alfaaz, Rakesh; all music is composed by Yo Yo Honey Singh.

Track Listing
No.	Title	Writer(s)	Artist	Length
1.	"Tu Mera 22 Mein Tera 22"	Alfaaz	Yo Yo Honey Singh	00:02:51
2.	"Main Naiyo Jaana"	Alfaaz	Amrinder Gill	00:03:55
3.	"Baby This Baby That"		Mika Singh	00:03:12
4.	"Wakh"		Amrinder Gill	00:05:10
5.	"Dance To the Beat"		Amrinder Gill	00:03:32
6.	"Maula Jaane"		Amrinder Gill	00:05:20
7.	"Horan Naal Nachdi"	Rose husan	Master Saleem	00:03:42
Total length:				00:27:42

== Reception ==
=== Box office ===
According to estimates published by Box Office Mojo, Tu Mera 22 Main Tera 22 earned ₹4.8 million worldwide.

=== Critical response ===
Ballewood has given 4 (out of 5) stars to the movie saying, that "the movie is meant for those who are looking for non-stop entertainment and heavy doses of laughter. Tu Mera 22 Main Tera 22 is a winner all the way. A sure-shot hit." Ballewood also praised the director Amit Prasher for presenting a comedy in a sensible way.

Punjabiportal gave the film an above average rating of 3 out of 5. According to them, the film "is good and it will do fine on box office as well, but the complaint is that if they had done it better, it had all the ingredients of making into a huge hit of 2013. Supporting act of Binnu Dhillon has been praised once again, so much so that the lead cast has to be the lead cast, but in Tu Mera 22, the supporting cast is overshadowing the lead."

== Awards ==
Tu Mera 22 Main Tera 22 won two awards at the PTC Punjabi Film Awards in 2014.

Category	Winner's Name
Best Performance in a Comic Role	B.N. Sharma
Best Popular Song of the Year	Amrinder Gill for Wakh
