= Tunka Tunka =

- Directed by: Garry Khatrao
- Written by: J Davin
- Produced by: Hardeep Grewal
- Starring: Hardeep Grewal; Sardar Sohi; Sameep Ranaut; Balwinder Bullet
- Distributed by: PTC Globe Moviez
- Release date: 5 August 2021
- Country: India
- Language: Punjabi

Tunka Tunka is a 2021 Punjabi-language drama film directed by Garry Khatrao, produced by IG Studios, and written by J Davin. It stars Hardeep Grewal and Hashneen Chauhan and was released on 5 August 2021. It is the debut film of Hardeep Grewal.

== Plot ==
Tunka Tunka's story revolves around a boy (Fateh Singh) who aspires to beat the world in a race with his 24-inch ‘Desi’ cycle. He toils hard under the guidance of a significant mentor. Furthermore, he starts his journey and soon his passion brings him laurels. He grabs the title of a nationwide biking champion. But, as it says no battle comes easy. Fateh encounters a series of hindrances in his journey to success. However, his life takes a halt when he discovers he's been infected with cancer.

== Cast ==
- Hardeep Grewal
- Hashneen Chauhan
- Sardar Sohi
- Balwinder Bullet
- Lakha Lehri
- Antar
- Jagdeep Sarpanch
- Armaan
- Sameep Ranaut
- Rubina Dhaliwal
- Mandeep Singh
- Gagandeep Singh
- Sunny

== Release ==
The movie was released on the big screens on 5 August 2021. It was later on released on the Chaupal Ott platform.

== Reception ==
The reviewer for Kidaan.com called the film "a must-watch because it has something usual, and really motivating."
