= Japinder Kaur =

Indian film director

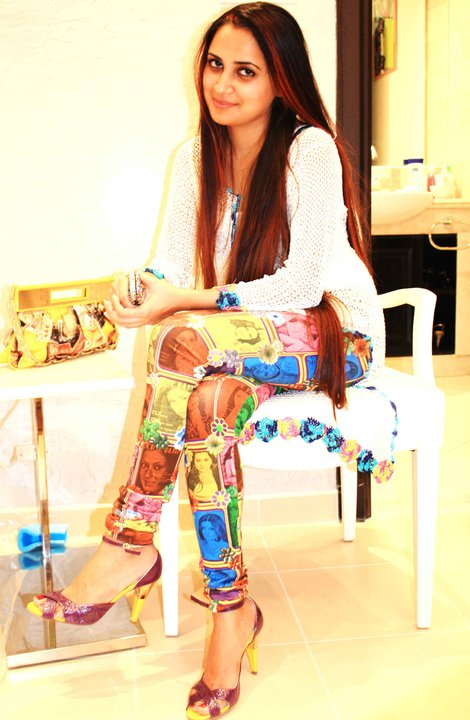
- Japinder Kaur, Dubai, UAE
- Born: Dubai, United Arab Emirates
- Citizenship: India
- Occupation(s): film director, Fashion Designer
- Spouse: Harpreet Singh Chadha

Japinder Kaur is an Indian film director, producer, writer, painter and co-founder of JAP FILMS LLC in Dubai.

== Early life and family ==
Born to a Sikh business family, Kaur has one brother.

She married businessman Harpreet Singh Chadha in 2017.

== Education ==
Japinder was born in Dubai, and did her schooling from The Indian High School, Dubai with majors in Science with Computer Science. She graduated from Manipal University, Dubai with a specialization in Television Production. She continued her post graduation in Whistling Woods International Institute, Mumbai, and studied Film Direction there.

== Career ==
Japinder worked as a news reporter and producer for noted English TV channel City 7 TV in 2008. She then directed a short films and documentaries that did rounds at the film festivals all over the world. Having assisted veteran directors such as Prakash Jha, Shashant Shah, Koushik Sarkar (Ad Filmmaker), she moved on to direct her first Bollywood feature film, Dilliwali Zaalim Girlfriend in 2013 under the banner Jap Films.

In 2018, Japinder ventured into the fashion industry and started the brand SnK Couture (Singh and Kaur) in Toronto. The label specializes in handcrafted classic Cashmere and red carpet looks.

== Filmography ==
- Via Kargil (Short) – writer and director
- Aarakshan (Feature) – marketing team
- Dilliwali Zaalim Girlfriend (Feature) – director
- Munda Faridkotia – Punjabi Indian Movie
