= Six Each =

Indian Punjabi-language crime drama film

- Directed by: Garry Khatrao
- Written by: Hardeep Grewal
- Produced by: Hardeep Grewal
- Starring: Hardeep Grewal, Mandy Takhar, Malkeet Rauni, Sanju Solanki, Amaninder Pal Singh, Harinder Bhullar, Gurpreet Toti, Sukhdev Barnala
- Production companies: Hardeep Grewal Productions, Wanton Productions
- Release date: 14 March 2025
- Country: India
- Language: Punjabi

Six Each is a 2025 Indian Punjabi-language crime drama film directed by Garry Khatrao and produced by Hardeep Grewal under Hardeep Grewal Productions and Wanton Productions. The film stars Hardeep Grewal and Mandy Takhar in lead roles, supported by Malkeet Rauni, Sanju Solanki, Amaninder Pal Singh, Harinder Bhullar, Gurpreet Toti, and Sukhdev Barnala. It was released theatrically on 14 March 2025.

== Plot ==
The film follows Navdeep, an Indian student in Canada whose life is upended when she is accused of her husband's death after allegedly deceiving him to secure a visa. The story explores themes of immigration, deception, and the legal and social consequences of false accusations.

== Cast ==
- Mandy Takhar
- Hardeep Grewal
- Malkeet Rauni
- Sanju Solanki
- Amaninder Pal Singh
- Harinder Bhullar
- Gurpreet Toti
- Sukhdev Barnala

== Production ==
Six Each was directed by Garry Khatrao and written and produced by Hardeep Grewal. It was produced by Hardeep Grewal Productions and Wanton Productions in the Punjabi language.

== Release ==
The film was released in theatres on 14 March 2025. It later premiered on OTT platforms such as Amazon Prime, Chaupal and OTTplay Premium on 17 July 2025.

== Reception ==
Punjabi Mania praised the film's gritty tone and its focus on justice and resilience, highlighting its socially relevant narrative. Chaupal Updates appreciated the strong performances and the film's underlying message, calling it impactful and meaningful. The Pollywood described the film as a gripping courtroom drama, noting its emotional weight while pointing out minor pacing issues.
