= Zorawar =

- Poster
- Directed by: Vinnil Markan
- Written by: Sagar Pandya
- Produced by: PTC Motion Pictures; Rajiee M. Shinde; Rabindra Narayan
- Starring: Yo Yo Honey Singh; Pratham Gupta; Parul Gulati; Bani J Pawan Malhotra; Mukul Dev; Achint Kaur; Amit Behl
- Cinematography: Mohana Krishna
- Edited by: Sandeep Francis
- Music by: Yo Yo Honey Singh
- Production company: PTC Motion Pictures
- Distributed by: AA Films
- Release date: 6 May 2016
- Running time: 151 minutes
- Country: India
- Language: Punjabi

Zorawar is a Punjabi-language action film directed by Vinnil Markan, cinematography by Mohana Krishna and produced by PTC Motion Pictures. The film stars Yo Yo Honey Singh as the title character, alongside actresses Bani J and Parul Gulati. It was partly filmed in Durban during 2014, however released after a long delay on 6 May 2016.

== Plot ==
Zorawar Singh (Yo Yo Honey Singh) is an Indian Army officer with Rapid Task Force. After completing an assignment, he asks for a holiday from his senior which is granted. Zorawar comes back to his home to his loving mother Sheetal Singh (Achint Kaur). One day Mrs Singh shows Zorawar some photos of suitable brides to her son. Zorawar then sees a girl (Jasleen) whom he had met earlier at college. They go on a date where Jasleen is shocked to know that Zorawar is actually an army officer. She declines an offer of marriage because she wants to complete her graduation and go abroad for a master's degree in film making. Zorawar agrees with Jasleen's decisions and returns home. At home, Mrs Singh receives letters from her dead father which contain information about Zorawar's biological father Samar Singh. When Zorawar returns, home his mother tells him that she & Samar met in Canada while pursuing their master's degree. Samar tells Sheetal that he is the son of a dangerous gangster back home and came to Canada to stay away from gang violence. Samar and Sheetal engage in romance, but one day Samar leaves, stating that he had received a letter from his elder brother stating that his father is ill. Returning home, Samar gets to know that his family has been massacred by his father's rival due to someone backstabbing him. Before Samar is to be killed, an unknown man (Amit Behl) saves Samar and they together kill the rival gang members. Samar- along with the unknown person named Angad- moves to Durban (South Africa) where he establishes himself as a dreaded don. Zorawar then travels to Durban to find his father but became unsuccessful in getting any information. With the help of an Indian origin police officer named Tejpal Singh (Pawan Malhotra), he gets to know that his father died years ago in a gang war in a rivalry with a much more powerful don named Sangram. Somehow Tejpal helps Zorawar in getting inside Sangram's gang, but unknown to Zorawar, Sangram is actually his father, Samar Singh. At last, it is revealed that Tejpal was a traitor who backstabbed Samar Singh in massacring his family and used Zorawar to kill his own father to avenge the death of his wife at the hands of Samar. In the end, Tejpal is killed by the father-son duo, and the family unites back.

== Cast ==
- Yo Yo Honey Singh as Major Zorawar Singh (MzS)
- Bani J as Zoya
- Parul Gulati as Jasleen
- Pawan Malhotra as Tejpal Singh
- Mukul Dev as Sangram ( Samar Partap Singh )
- Achint Kaur as Sheetal (Major Zorawar Singh Mother)
- Amit Behl as Angad
- Jasmine Sandlas in a Special Appearance in song "Raat Jashan Di"

== Soundtrack ==
=== Track listing ===
Track Listing & Credits
No.	Title	Lyrics	Music	Singer(s)	Length
1.	"Raat Jashan Di"	Yo Yo Honey Singh, Jasmine Sandlas	Yo Yo Honey Singh	Yo Yo Honey Singh, Jasmine Sandlas	4:55
2.	"Superman"	Yo Yo Honey Singh	Yo Yo Honey Singh	Yo Yo Honey Singh	3:51
3.	"Call Aundi"	Yo Yo Honey Singh, Alfaaz, Lil Golu	Yo Yo Honey Singh	Yo Yo Honey Singh	3:36
4.	"Kalley Rehen De"	Alfaaz	Yo Yo Honey Singh	Alfaaz	2:48
Total length:					15:11

== Sequel ==
In Mid-2025, There were plans to have a sequel of Zorawar titled Zorawar 2 which will star Yo Yo Honey Singh in main lead.
