= Hardeep Grewal (Punjabi actor) =

Indian Singer and Actor

- Born: Ludhiana, Punjab, India
- Occupations: Singer and actor
- Works: Tunka Tunka, Six Each
- Years active: 2015–present

Hardeep Grewal is an Indian singer, lyricist, actor, and film producer associated with the Punjabi music and film industries. He is known for playing lead roles in films like Six Each, Tunka Tunka and Batch 2013.

== Early life and education ==
Grewal was born in Jamalpur village, Ludhiana district, Punjab, India. He completed his schooling in Punjab and later pursued engineering, earning postgraduate qualifications in production engineering. Before entering the entertainment industry, he worked as a lecturer.

== Career ==
=== Music ===
Grewal began his professional music career in 2015 with the release of his debut album Thokar. Following his debut, he released several songs like “Thokar,” “Bulandiyan,” “40 Kille,” “Juti Jharrke,” “Jindarriye,” and “Mashhoor.” His work as a singer and lyricist is often associated with motivational and socially reflective themes.

=== Film ===
Grewal later expanded his career into Punjabi cinema. He made his acting debut with Tunka Tunka (2021), in which he also served as a writer and producer. He followed this with Batch 2013 (2022), continuing his involvement in acting, writing, and production. In subsequent years, Grewal appeared in Je Paisa Bolda Hunda (2024) as an actor. He later starred in the crime drama Six Each (2025), in which he also contributed as a writer and producer.

== Discography ==
=== Album ===
Year	Album	Type
2015	Thokar	Studio album
2016	Taare	Studio album
2018	Bulandiyan	Studio album
2019	Unstoppable	Studio album

=== Single ===
Year	Song	Notes
2015	Thokar	Single
2015	40 Kille	Single
2016	Juti Jharrke	Single
2018	Bulandiyan	Single
2019	Jindarriye	Single
2019	Mashhoor	Single
2020	Hook n Crook	Single
2020	Yes You Can	Single

== Filmography ==
Year	Film	Role
2021	Tunka Tunka	Actor, writer, producer
2022	Batch 2013	Actor, writer, producer
2024	Je Paisa Bolda Hunda	Actor
2025	Six Each	Actor, writer, producer
