= Baljit Malwa =

Indian record producer, musician (born 1968)

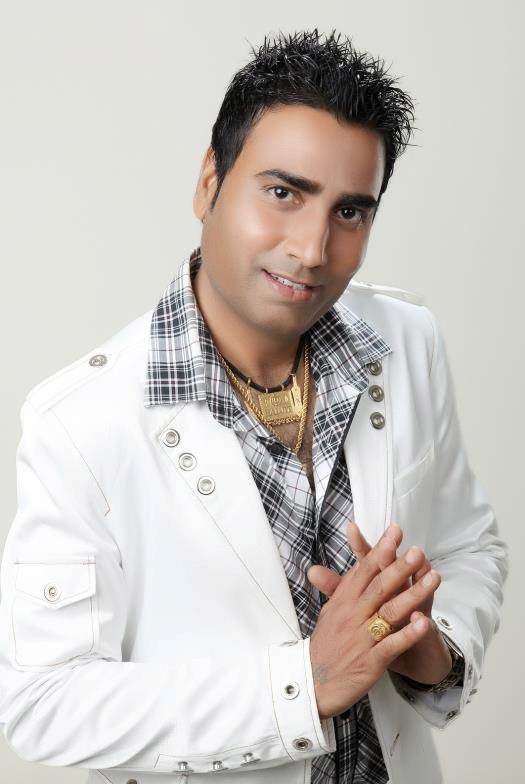
- Baljit Malwa Posing at king film studio

Background information
- Born: Baljit Singh Malwa; 29 May 1968 (age 58)
- Genres: Bhangra, Indi-pop
- Occupations: Record producers, musician, music director, singer-songwriter
- Years active: 2008–present
- Labels: MovieBox, United Kingdom; Music Waves, Canada; StarMakers, India
- Website: www.baljitmalwa.com

Baljit Malwa (born 29 May 1968) is an Indian record producer, musician and singer-songwriter.

== Discography ==
Release	Album	Record label	Music
2022	Chhikan	Baljit Malwa Music	Kahlon Avtar
2022	Chann To Sunakhi	Baljit Malwa Music	Sukha Daudpuri
2022	Punjab Siyan	Jagtaraa Films	Jelly Manjitpuri
2021	White House	Total Multimedia Music	Kuwar Virk
2018	Maujan 2	Khehra Entertainment	Danger Beats
2018	Chaabi 2	Jass Records	Danger Beats
2016	Jatti in Feeling – Single	Shemaroo Punjabi	Kaos Productions
2015	Sohni Te Sunakhi – Single	MovieBox	Kaos Productions
2014	Bhagat Singh – Single	MovieBox	Sukhpal Sukh
2014	Pauna Bhangra – Single	MovieBox	Tru-Skool & Kaos Productions
2014	Singh Laadle	Kamlee Records	Jassi Bros
2013	Hyper 2 (Song: Jatt Hurrr) / Duo Collaboration	MovieBox	Popsy (Music Machine)
2012	Pardes	Kamlee Records/T-Series	Anu-Manu
2011	Batuaa	Speed Records	Jassi Bros
2010	Trakkiyan	Kamlee Records/Speed Records	Jassi Bros
2008	Maujan	Goyal Music	Jassi Bros

== Filmography ==
Release	Film	Role	Notes	Label
2012	Kabaddi Once Again	Ravi Ali	Cameo	T-Series/H&H Production
2012	Carry On Jatta (Playback Singer) Song: Tumba Nai Vajda	TBA	Track 11	Speed Records
2012	Meri Chargay Jawani Sohniyeh	Veet Sielo	With Surjit Khan	Speed Records
2014	California Desi	California	With Geeta Zaildar & Music By: Bhinda Aujla	Speed Records
