= Mika Singh =

Indian singer and musician (born 1977)

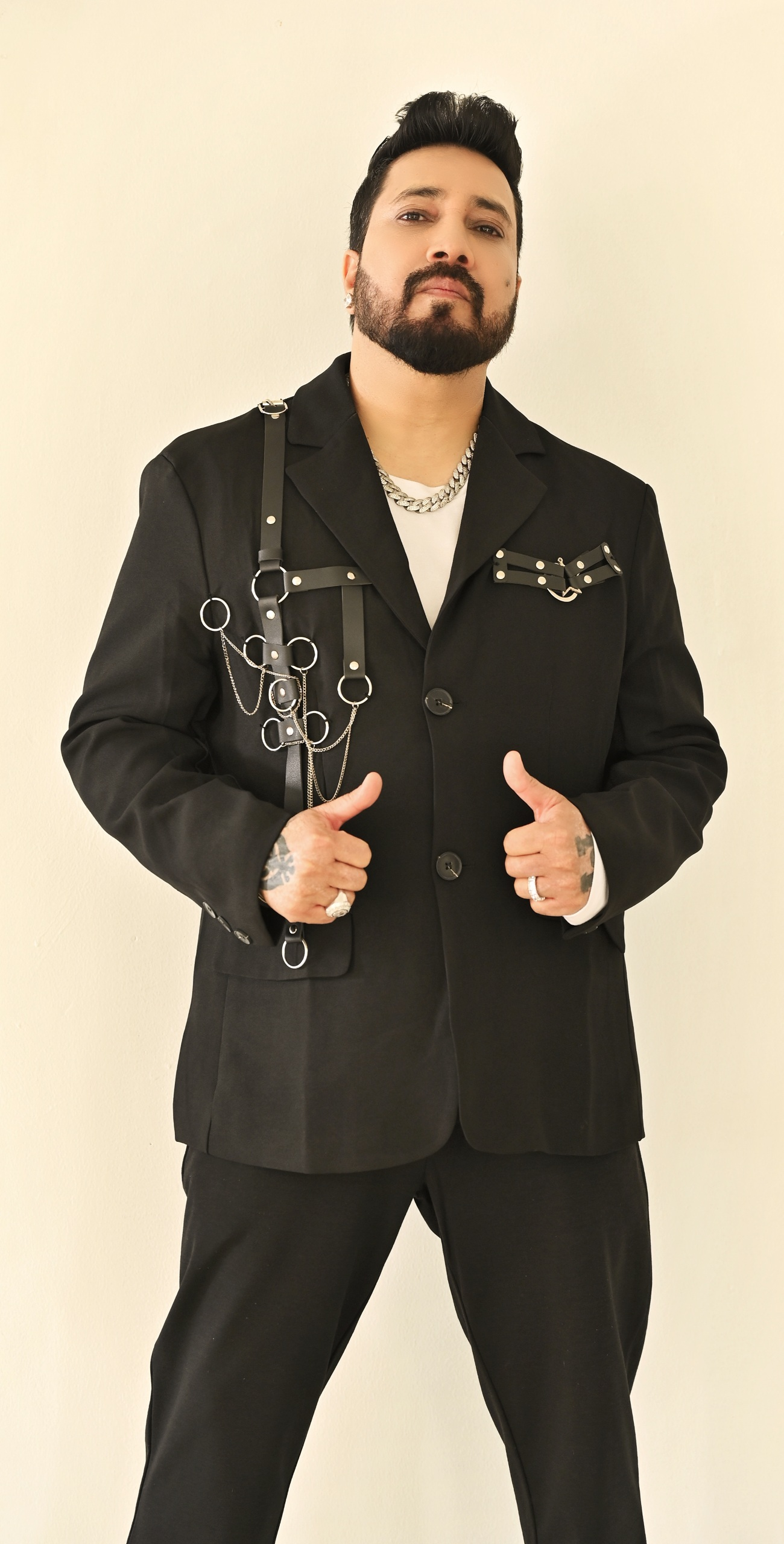
- Born: Amrik Singh; 10 June 1977 (age 49); Durgapur, West Bengal, India
- Occupations: Playback singer, music director, composer, music producer and actor
- Years active: 1998–2002, 2006–present
- Known for: Singing, Music and Acting
- Political party: Aam Aadmi Party
- Family: Daler Mehndi (brother)

YouTube information
- Channel: Mika Singh
- Genre: Pop
- Subscribers: 617 thousand
- Views: 497 million
- Last updated: 20 October 2025

Amrik "Mika" Singh (born 10 June 1977) is an Indian singer, rapper, musician and actor. His songs include "Bas Ek King" (Singh Is Kinng), "Mauja Hi Mauja" (Jab We Met), "Ibn-e-Batuta" (Ishqiya), "Dhanno" (Housefull), "Dhinka Chika" (Ready) and "Chinta Ta Chita" (Rowdy Rathore). He has released several solo albums and appeared on reality shows. His song "Sawan Main Lag Gayi Aag" was remixed by U.S based singer Pinky Paras.

== Early life ==
Singh was born on 10 June 1977 as Amrik Singh in Durgapur, West Bengal. He is the youngest of eight, two daughters and six sons. Singh and his elder brother Daler Mehndi were inspired by their father, Ajmer Singh, a trained classical musician who used to sing kirtans in Patna Sahib Gurdwara since childhood.

== Concerts and tours ==
In 2014, Singh performed live and sold out in Bollywood Showstoppers at The O2 Arena with Arjun Kapoor, Sonakshi Sinha, Jacqueline Fernandez, Shahid Kapoor, Ali Zafar, and supported by Bollywood dance group Bolly Flex, that appeared Sky1's dance competition show, Got to Dance.

Singh also performed at his biggest outdoor concert at the Sandwell & Birmingham Mela in 2016 with an overall audience for the duration of the Mela estimated to be 80,000.

== Controversies ==
In 2006, Rakhi Sawant lodged a case against Mika, alleging that he kissed her against her will.

In 2011, singer Mika was reportedly involved in a hit and run case, according to PTI. It was alleged that Mika's Hummer collided with an auto rickshaw during the early hours of the morning in Mumbai. However, Mika denied being the driver at the time of the incident. Two police officers and the auto rickshaw driver asserted that they had seen the singer behind the wheel of the car.

In 2013, Mika Singh's farmhouse in Gurgaon was reportedly sealed following alleged violations of the environmental laws on the property.

In 2015, Singh reportedly slapped a doctor at an event in New Delhi, organised by the Delhi Ophthalmological Society. The altercation caused a negative reaction from attending doctors, and the doctor allegedly suffered a perforated eardrum as a result.

In 2018, Singh was detained in the UAE following a case filed against him by a Brazilian teenage model, accusing him of sexual assault. Subsequently, he was incarcerated and later released with the intervention of the Indian Embassy.

On 14 August 2019, All India Cine Workers Association (AICWA) imposed a ban on singer Mika Singh from the Indian film industry due to his performance at an event in Karachi, Pakistan. The event organised by a close relative of former Pakistani president Pervez Musharraf, prompted the film body to enforce an unconditional ban on the singer and boycotted him from all the movies and music contracts with the entertainment companies. The association also sought the intervention of Information and Broadcasting ministry in the matter.

== Political career ==
Mika Singh served as the star campaigner for the Aam Aadmi Party during the 2022 MCD elections.

He donated Rs 21 lakh to the Aam Aadmi Party, which was acknowledged by Vishal Dadlani in a tweet, praising Mika Singh.

== Discography ==
Denotes films that have not yet been released

=== Hindi film soundtracks ===
Year	Film	Song title	Note		
2006	Apna Sapna Money Money	Dil Mein Baji Guitar			
2006	Pyaar Ke Side Effects	Dil Tod Ke Na Ja (Remix)			
2007	Dus Kahaniyaan	Nachle Soniye			
2007	Jab We Met	Mauja Hi Mauja			
2007	Dhol	O Yaara Dhol Bajake			
2007	Shootout at Lokhandwala	Ganpat			
2007	Nehlle Pe Dehlla	Neeli Neeli Aankhon Wali			
2008	Wafaa	Muztarib			
2008	Dil Kabaddi	OK Tata Done			
2008	Oye Lucky! Lucky Oye!	Oye Lucky! Lucky Oye!			
2008	Oye Lucky! Lucky Oye!	Oye Lucky (Remix)			
2008	C Kkompany	Khoka			
2008	My Friend Ganesha 2	Ganesha			
2008	Singh Is Kinng	Singh Is Kinng			
2008	Singh Is Kinng	Bhutni Ke			
2008	Ugly Aur Pagli	Talli			
2008	Mission Istaanbul	Apun Ke Saath			
2008	Woodstock Villa	Saawan Mein Lag Gayi Aag			
2008	Mr. White Mr. Black	Tu Makke Di Roti			
2009	De Dana Dan	"Baamulaiza"			
2009	De Dana Dan	"Baamulaiza" (Ragga Mix)			
2009	De Dana Dan	"Baamulaiza (Remix)"			
2009	Ajab Prem Ki Ghazab Kahani	Oh By God			
2009	Dil Bole Hadippa!	Dil Bole Hadippa			
2009	Quick Gun Murugun	Quick Gun Murugun			
2009	Life Partner	Aage Aage	Co-sung by Soham Chakraborty, Antara Mitra; music by Pritam		
2009	Ek Aadat	Ek Aadat			
2009	Jai Veeru	Dhun Lagi			
2009	Jugaad	Tabahi Tabahi			
2009	Bad Luck Govind	Duniya Hai Gol			
2010	Mitti	Ni Mera Dil Tera			
2010	Action Replayy	Nakhre			
2010	Right Yaaa Wrong				
2010	Ishqiya	Ibn-E-Batuta			
2010	Lamhaa	Saajna			
2010	Once Upon a Time in Mumbaai	Babu Rao Mast Hai			
2010	Housefull	Aapka Kya Hoga (Dhanno)			
2010	Toh Baat Pakki	Jis Din			
2010	Band Baaja Baaraat	Bhangra Pauna Nachna			
2011	I Am Singh	Dhol Wajda			
2011	Mausam	Saj Dhaj Ke			
2011	Thank You	Pyar Do Pyar Lo			
2011	Thank You	"Pyaar Do Pyaar Lo" (Remix by Abhijit Vaghani)		Dharti	Gaddi Modange
2011	Loot	Saari Duniya Mere Ispe			
2011	Desi Boyz	Subah Hone Na De			
2011	Hum Tum Shabana	Thank U Mr. DJ			
2011	Pyar Ka Punchnama	Ban Gaya Kutta			
2011	Pyar Ka Punchnama	Ishq Na Kariyo Kake			
2011	Bodyguard	Desi Beat			
2011	Double Dhamaal	Chill Maro & Chal Kudie			
2011	Ready	Dhink Chika			
2011	Tanu Weds Manu	Jugni			
2011	Yaar Annmulle	Jatt Tinka			
2011	Pure Punjabi	Pure Punjabi			
2011	F.A.L.T.U	Aal Tu Jalal Tu			
2011	2012	Kismat Love Paisa Dilli	Dont Fuff My Mind		
2011	2012	OMG: Oh My God!	Go Go Govinda		
Khiladi 786	2012	Long Drive			
Tu Mera 22 Main Tera 22	2012	Baby This, Baby That			
Men In Black 3	2012	Main Tera Ishq			
Son of Sardaar	2012	Rani Tu Mein Raja			
Ajab Gazabb Love	2012	Ajab Gazabb Love (Title Track)			
Ajab Gazabb Love	2012	Boom Boom (Lip Lock)			
Power Cut	2012	Power Cut			
From Sydney with Love	2012	Khatkaa Khatkaa			
Challo Driver	2012	Kudi Pataka Driver			
Teri Meri Kahaani	2012	Humse Pyar Karle Tu			
Department	2012	Kammo			
Rowdy Rathore	2012	Chinta Ta Chita			
Vicky Donor	2012	Chaddha			
Bittoo Boss	2012	Bittoo Sabki Photo Lega			
Agent Vinod	2012	Pyaar ki Pungi			
Bumboo	2012	Life Saali Life			
2013	Zindagi 50 50	Tu Saamne Jo Aaye			
2013	Jackpot	Full Jhol			
2013	R... Rajkumar	Gandi Baat	Lyrics by Anupam Amod; co-sung with Kalpana Patowary		
2013	Phata Poster Nikla Hero	Tu Mere Agal Bagal			
2013	Gori Tere Pyaar Mein	Tooh			
2013	Besharam	Aa Re Aa Re			
2013	Maazii	Totta			
2013	Grand Masti	Zulmi Zulmi			
2013	Zanjeer	Mumbai Ke Hero			
2013	Ramaiya Vastavaiya	Hip Hop Pammi			
2013	Ramaiya Vastavaiya	Jaadu Ki Jhappi			
2013	Ramaiya Vastavaiya	Jaadu Ki Jhappi (Reprise)			
2013	D-Day	Duma Dum			
2013	Boyss Toh Boyss Hain	Gol Gol			
2013	Fukrey	Beda Paar			
2013	Shortcut Romeo	Jave Saari Duniya			
2013	Yamla Pagla Deewana 2	Changli Hai Changli Hai			
2013	Yamla Pagla Deewana 2	Jatt Yamla Pagla Ho Gaya			
2013	Shootout at Wadala	Laila			
2013	Shootout at Wadala	Aala Re Aala			
2013	Mere Dad Ki Maruti	Punjabiyaan Di Battery			
2013	Zila Ghaziabad	Baap Ka Maal			
2013	ABCD: Any Body Can Dance	Psycho Re			
2013	Hum Hai Raahi Car Ke	Ding Dang Ding Dang			
2013	Jatts in Golmaal	Jatt Baal Duga			
2013	I Don't Luv U	Ishq Ki Maa Ki			
2013	Rangeelay	Headache			
2013	Lucky Di Unlucky Story	Lucky Di Unlucky Story			
2013	Chashme Baddoor	Ishq Mohallah			
2013	Pooja Kiven AA	Ludhiane			
2013	Himmatwala	Taki Taki			
2013	Jolly LLB	Daru Peeke Nachna			
2013	Four Two Ka One	Ishq Di Battiyan			
2014	O Teri	Ummbakkum			
2014	Kaanchi	Main Mushtanda			
2014	Balwinder Singh Famous Ho Gaya	Shake That Booty			
2014	Balwinder Singh Famous Ho Gaya	Kaun Samjhaye			
2014	Balwinder Singh Famous Ho Gaya	Main Tera Hoon"			
2014	Balwinder Singh Famous Ho Gaya	Bhopu			
2014	Meinu Ek Ladki Chaahiye	Teri To Jhand			
2014	Happy New Year	Nonsense Ki Night			
2014	The Shaukeens	Ishq Kutta Ha			
2014	Raja Natwarlal	Dukki Tikki			
2014	Its Entertainment	Veer Di Wedding			
2014	Holiday	Palang Tod			
2014	Kick	Jumme Ki Raat			
2014	Humshakals	Khol De Dil Ki Khidki			
2014	The Xpose	Catch Me If You Can			
2014	Purani Jeans	Out of Control			
2014	Bhoothnath Returns	Party To Banti Hai			
2014	Dishkiyaoon	Nachle Tu			
2014	Youngistaan	Tanki			
2014	Mission Sapne	Theme Song	TV show		
2014	Babloo Happy Hai	Jimmy Bhaand			
2015	Shamitabh	Lifebuoy			
2015	Badmashiyaan	Garden Garden			
2015	Hate Story 3	Neendein Khul Jaati Hain			
2015	Tamasha	Heer Toh Badi Sad Hai			
2015	Jawani Phir Nahi Ani	Khul Jaye Botal			
2015	Bajrangi Bhaijaan	Aaj Ki Party			
2015	ABCD 2	Happy Hour			
2015	Welcome 2 Karachi	Boat Ma Kukdookoo			
2015	Hey Bro	Line Laga			
2015	Tevar	Madamiyan			
2015	Welcome Back	Welcome Back			
2016	Happy Bhag Jayegi	Gabru Ready To Mingle Hai			
2016	Sultan	440 Volt			
2016	Housefull 3	Taang Uthake			
2016	Housefull 3	Malamaal			
2016	Mastizaade	Rom Rom Romantic			
2016	Dishoom	Subah Hone Na De (Remix)			
2017	Secret Superstar	Sexy Baliye			
2017	Ranchi Diaries	Godfather			
2017	Shubh Mangal Saavdhan	Laddoo			
2017	Baadshaho	Piya More			
2017	Mubarakan	Hawa Hawa	Remake		
2017	Flat 211	Criminal Akhiyan			
2017	Phillauri	Whats Up			
2017	Raees	Dhingana			
2017	Sarkar 3	Angry Mix			
2018	Simmba	Aankh Maarey	Remake		
2018	Dassehra	Silent Mode			
2018	5 Weddings	American Beauty			
2018	FryDay	Bade Chote			
2018	Batti Gul Meter Chalu	Hard Hard			
2018	Stree	Milegi Milegi			
2018	Nawabzaade	Lagi Hawa Dil Ko			
2018	Race 3	Party Chale On			
2018	Nanu Ki Jaanu	Bhoot Aaya			
2018	Veerey Ki Wedding	Mind Blowing			
2018	Welcome To New York	Meher Hai Rab Di			
2018	Sonu Ke Titu Ki Sweety	Sweety Slowly Slowly			
2018	Padman	The Padman Song			
2018	Teri Bhabhi Hai Pagle	Confused Lover			
2018	Baa Baa Black Sheep	Galla Goriyan			
2018	Baa Baa Black Sheep	Heer			
2019	Family of Thakurganj	Fancy Thumke			
2019	Marne Bhi Do Yaaron				
2019	Prassthanam	Dil Bevda			
2019	Dream Girl	Dhagala Lagali			
2019	Hume Tumse Pyaar Kitna	Manmohini			
2019	De De Pyaar De	Mukhda Vekh Ke			
2019	Milan Talkies	Mind Na Kariyo Holi Hai			
2019	Luka Chuppi	Poster Lagwa Do	Remake		
2019	Made In China	Sanedo			
2019	Pati Patni Aur Woh	Aankhiyon Se Goli Mare	Remake		
2019	Yaaram	Kya Pandit			
2019	Pagalpanti	Tum Pe Hum Hai	Remake		
2020	Shikara	'Chattar Pattar"			
2020	Shubh Mangal Zyada Saavdhan	Aisi Taisi			
2020	Jai Mummy Di	Ishq Da Band			
2020	Gulabo Sitabo	Kanjoos	Amazon Prime Video film		
2020	Raat Akeli Hai	Adhe Adhe Se	Netflix film		
2020	Its My Life	Its My Life	Zee Cinema film		
2020	Dangerous	Dangerous	MX Player web series		
2020	Dangerous	Majnu	MX Player web series		
2020	Dangerous	Eyes Teri	MX Player web series		
2020	Dangerous	Mujhko Apni Jaan	MX Player web series		
2020	Ginny Weds Sunny	Sawan Mein Lag Gayi Aag	Netflix film		
2020	Indoo Ki Jawani	Hasina Pagal Deewani			
2021	KRK Kutta		Single		
2021	Bhuj: The Pride of India	Bhai Bhai	Disney Plus Hotstar film		
2021	Roohi	Bhootni			
2021	Bunty Aur Babli 2	Dhik Chik			
2021	Chandigarh Kare Aashiqui	"Attraction"			
2021	Velle	Raja Boy			
2022	Heropanti 2	Whistle Baja 2.0	Remake		
2022	Nikamma	Killer			
2022	Govinda Naam Mera	Bijli	Disney Plus Hotstar film		
2022	Dasvi	Macha	Netflix film		
2023	Fukrey 3	Macha Re			
2023	Aankh Micholi	Aankh Micholi			
2023	Ganapath	"Hum Aaye Hain" (Version 2)	Music by White Noise Studios, lyrics by Priya Saraiya, co-sung by Shilpa Rao		
2024	Sarfira	Dhokha			
2024	Wild Wild Punjab	Suttebaaz Haseena	Netflix film		
2025	Deva	Bhasad Macha			
2025	Be Happy	Sultana	Amazon Prime Video film		
2025	Be Happy	Superstar	Amazon Prime Video film		
2026	Hai Jawani Toh Ishq Hona Hai	"Vyah Karwado Ji"			
2026	Yeh Prem Mol Liya	Aaja O Baby			

=== Other Languages ===
Year	Film	Song title	Language
2010	Adhurs	"Pilla Naa Valla Kaadu"	Telugu
2011	Krishan Marriage Story	"Nidde Bandilla"	Kannada
2011	Paglu	Title Track	Bengali
2012	Paglu 2	Title Track	Bengali
2012	Khokababu	"Pyar Ka Jhatka"	Bengali
2013	Victory	"Vone Vone"	Kannada
2013	Rangbaaz	"Tui Amar Hero"	Bengali
2013	Khoka 420	"Mad I Am Mad"	Bengali
2013	Balupu	"Pathikella Chinnadi"	Telugu
2013	Mirchi	"Yahoon Yahoon"	Telugu
2014	Darling	"A Darling Darling"	Kannada
2014	Mental	"Aaila Re Aaila"	Odia
2015	Herogiri	"Panga"	Bengali
2015	Jawani Phir Nahi Ani	"Khul Jaye Botal"	Urdu
2016	Jaguar	"Selfie" feat. Kanika Kapoor	Kannada
2017	Parchi	"Imagine"	Urdu
2018	Hoichoi Unlimited	"Hobe Re Hoichoi"	Bengali
2022	Tich Button	"Jutt"	Urdu
2023	Chengiz	"Ragada"	Bengali, also in Hindi
2026	Bhootam Bhayyam	"Happy New Year"	Marathi
2026	Mitrata	"Lagan Lagan"	Gujarati

=== Solo albums ===
Year	Album	Featured song
1998	Greatest Indipop Album Ever	"Saawan Mein Lag Gayi Aag"
2000	Mika And Other Hits Part – 1	"Ishq Brandy"
2001	Gabru	"Gabru"
2002	O Sanam Janeman	"Jaan Qurban"
2006	Something Something	"Jaattan Ka Chhora"
2007	Donaali	"Tere Aage Nahin Chalni (Donaali)"
2008	Dunali (Rifle)	"Dunali (remix) Single Track" feat. Bohemia
2009	Sher-E-Punjab	"Sher-E-Punjab" feat. Bohemia
2011	Sitare – The Stars	"Maahi Kehan De"
2012	9 Track Album	"Pardese"
2013	Champions League T20	"Ragad Ragad Humma"
2014	Mika Singh Is King	"Mast Kalandar" feat. Yo Yo Honey Singh
2015	Sizzling Sunny	"Super Girl From China" feat. Kanika Kapoor
2016	Billo Single	"Billo"
2018	Kalesh	"Kalesh Song" feat. Millind Gaba
2022	Majnu	"Majnu"

== Filmography ==
Film
Year	Film	Role	Language
2010	Mitti	Gazzi Dhillon	Punjabi
2011	Loot	Varinder Yuvraaj Singh	Hindi
2014	Balwinder Singh Famous Ho Gaya	Balwinder	Hindi
2026	Welcome to the Jungle	TBA	Hindi

Television
Year	Series	Role
2007	Jhalak Dikhhla Jaa 2	Contestant
2009	Iss Jungle Se Mujhe Bachao	Contestant
2009–2010	Music Ka Maha Muqqabla	Team Captain
2014	F.I.R.	Himself
2015	The Voice India	Judge
2015	Tashan-e-Ishq	Guest
2016	Comedy Nights Live	Permanent Guest
2016	Sa Re Ga Ma Pa 2016	Mentor/Judge
2018	India Ke Mast Kalandar	Judge
2021	Zee Comedy Show	Judge
2022	Anupamaa	Himself
2022	Swayamvar – Mika Di Vohti	Himself
2023	Chamak	Himself
