= Raula Pai Gaya =

- Directed by: Atharv Baluja
- Screenplay by: Bobby Sandhu
- Story by: Rahul Deveshwar and Atharv Baluja
- Produced by: RG Productions
- Starring: Ravinder Grewal, Surbhi Jyoti, Binnu Dhillon, Jaswinder Bhalla, B. N. Sharma, Kartar Cheema, Sardar Sohi and Maninder Vaily, Parjesh kapil
- Cinematography: Atharv Baluja & Umesh Kumar
- Edited by: Rahul Bajaj
- Music by: Ravinder Grewal
- Release date: 31 August 2012
- Country: India
- Language: Punjabi

Raula Pai Gaya - Fun Unlimited is a Punjabi film starring Ravinder Grewal and Surbhi Jyoti in the main lead. The movie is home production of Ravinder Grewal under his banner RG Productions. The film is directed by Atharv Baluja. Raula Pai Gaya's music was given by Ravinder Grewal himself. The movie's story was written by Rahul Deveshwar and Atharv Baluja. Bobby Sandhu wrote the screenplay and Dialogues.

== Plot ==
The film was shot entirely in Punjab, with most of the shoot taking place at Ludhiana, Patiala and Chandigarh. One of the song sequences was shot in Goa as well.

This film was released on 31 August 2012.

== Cast and crew ==
- Ravinder Grewal as Rajvir
- Surbhi Jyoti as Reet
- Parjesh Kapil as Chhottu
- Jaswinder Bhalla as Prof. Bhalla
- Binnu Dhillon as Sunny
- B.N. Sharma as Sweety
- Sardar Sohi as Chacha
- Kartar Cheema as Sukhi
- Maninder Vaily as Ghochi
- Bobby Layal as Harman
- Damandeep Singh Mann as Bajwa
- Harjit Harman as Guest appearance
- Raviraj as Lyrics
