= Mirza – The Untold Story =

2012 film by Baljit Singh Deo

Mirza
- Directed by: Baljit Singh Deo
- Screenplay by: Baljit Singh Deo
- Story by: Baljit Singh Deo
- Produced by: Aman Khatkar
- Starring: Gippy Grewal; Mandy Takhar; Rahul Dev
- Cinematography: Toby Gorman
- Edited by: Toby Gorman
- Music by: Honey Singh and Jatinder Shah
- Release date: 6 April 2012
- Country: India
- Language: Punjabi
- Budget: ₹30 million

Mirza: The Untold Story is a 2012 Indian Punjabi-language action romance film written and directed by Baljit Singh Deo. It stars Gippy Grewal and Mandy Takhar in the lead roles, with music rapper Honey Singh in his first commercial venture, as a dunce gangster. Produced by Inda Raikoti and Aman Khatkar, the movie had a historic opening across Punjab. The movie was released on 6 April 2012.

== Plot ==
Mirza: The Untold Story is based on the legendary love story of Mirza and Sahiba.

Mirza and his Sahiba fall in love with each other at a very young age. The plot continues many years later when Mirza and Sahiba return to the same home town where they once grew up together. Jeet, Sahiba's oldest brother, is a major gang leader in the city; nonetheless, he still maintains his family's honour. Mirza decides to infiltrate Jeet's gang. The story takes a turn as Mirza meets Sahiba, and their love flourishes once again. This leaves Mirza caught between his love and the hatred he has for her brothers. His battle becomes personal with his leader, Jeet.

Sahiba was a virtuous person who did not desire any bloodshed, but she knows that Jeet and Mirza are both men of strength., and one will end up dead. Until now, she has been sheltered from the real business of the family. Mirza enters Jeet's gang, yet Jeet doesn't know he's after Sahiba. Since Jeet would like Sahiba to marry Deesha, a fellow mad gang member, Mirza tries to run away with Sahiba. Then, Sahiba and Mirza lodge at the farm cabin, and Sahiba wakes up but feels that her brothers shouldn't be killed and takes out all the bullets from Mirza's gun, on which he depends. Suddenly one of Sahiba's brothers arrive and fights with Mirza. Mirza is winning the fight till he tries to shoot Sahiba's brother and realises the bullets have been taken out by Sahiba. Jeet then comes and shoots Mirza, and he dies while Sahiba is taken away from Mirza.

== Cast ==
- Gippy Grewal as Mirza
- Mandy Takhar as Saheba
- Rahul Dev as Jeet
- Upinder Randhawa as Bal
- Binnu Dhillon as Daler Singh/Goga Ghasun
- B.N. Sharma as Bahadur Singh/Tehal Singh Takkar
- Yo Yo Honey Singh as Deesha
- Sharik Khan as Deesha's friend
- Jaggi Singh as Navi

== Reception ==
Mirza had the highest opening day collections for a Punjabi film at the time of release and had the second highest opening weekend and week collections only behind Gippy's own movie Jihne Mera Dil Luteya. The opening week collections of Mirza in Punjab was Rs 24.7 million

== Accolades ==
Mirza: The Untold Story won eight awards at the 3rd PTC Punjabi Film Awards in 2013.

Category	Winner's Name
Best Villain	Rahul Dev
Popular Star of the Year	Gippy Grewal
Best Playback Singer (Male)	Rahat Fateh Ali Khan – Akhiyan
Best Cinematography	Toby Gorman
Best Background Score	Jatinder Shah
Best Debut Male	Yo Yo Honey Singh
Best Music Director	Yo Yo Honey Singh and Jatinder Shah
Critics Award for Best Actor	Gippy Grewal
