= Ravinder Grewal =

Indian singer and actor

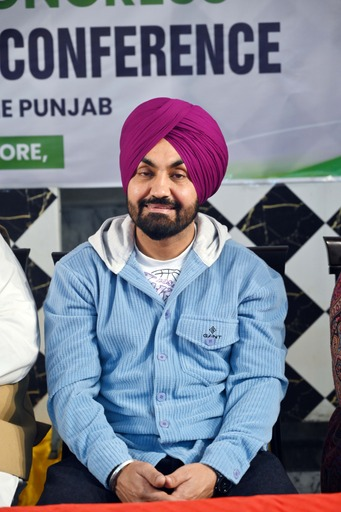

Background information
- Born: 28 March 1977 (age 49)
- Genres: Punjabi, Bhangra, Romantic, Pop
- Occupations: Singer, actor
- Years active: 1995–present
- Website: https://www.instagram.com/ravindergrewalofficial

Ravinder Singh Grewal (born 28 March 1973) known professionally as Ravinder Grewal, is an Indian singer and actor associated with Punjabi language music and films. He has produced a Punjabi-language film, Raula Pai Gaya, through his own production house. In 2015, he featured in the legal comedy Judge Singh LLB. His most popular songs include "Lovely V/s PU" and "Jatt Karjai", lyrics of both are penned by Preet Sanghreri.

== Filmography ==
- Raula Pai Gaya (2012)
- Yaar Velly (2014)
- Judge Singh LLB (2015)
- Danger Doctor Jelly (2017)
- 15 Lakh Kado Aauga (2019)
- Gidarh Singhi (2019)
- Vich Bolunga Tere (2022)
- Munda Sardaran Da (2022)
- Minda Lalari (2023)

== Personal life ==
Grewal comes from Gujjarwal village in Ludhiana district of Punjab. He is married and has one son but prefers to keep his family life private.
