= Dilpreet Bhatia =

Indian singer

Dilpreet Bhatia is an Indian singer-songwriter and technologist, born in Ludhiana in a Punjabi Sikh family. His song "Tere Bin Dil" won in the World Music Category of the International Songwriting Competition. In September 2014, he was selected as Grand Prize winner in season 1 of the John Lennon Songwriting Contest in the World Music category.

== Discography ==
Year	Album/single title	Details
2009	Ehsaas (EP)	Released : 17 April 2009 Label : Sur 'n' Soul Records Format : Digital & CD
2010	22 No. Faatak	Re-Released : 22 April 2012 Label : Sur 'n' Soul Records Format : Digital & CD
2011	Feel Freedom (single)	Released : 16 August 2011 Label : None Format : Digital
2012	Rabba Es Dil Nu – Acoustic (single)	Released : 31 January 2012 Label : None Format : Digital
2012	Saadi Wakhri Hai Shaan (feature film – music album)	Released : 23 September 2012 Label : Vibgyor Creations Format : Digital & CD
2013	Raat Din (single)	Released : 1 December 2013 Label : None Format : Digital
2014	Tu Thakur Tum Peh Ardas (single)	Released : 2 July 2014 Label : None Format : Digital
