= Lucky Di Unlucky Story =

Lucky Di Unluky Story
- Directed by: Smeep Kang
- Written by: Smeep Kang; Naresh Kathooria
- Starring: Gippy Grewal; Surveen Chawla; Binnu Dhillon; Gurpreet Ghuggi; Jaswinder Bhalla; Samiksha Singh; Karamjit Anmol
- Edited by: Jiten Rana
- Music by: Jatinder Shah
- Production companies: Gurfateh Films; Sippy Grewal Productions
- Release date: 26 April 2013
- Country: India
- Language: Punjabi

Lucky Di Unlucky Story (transl. Lucky's unlucky story) is a 2013 Punjabi comedy film directed by Smeep Kang, and featuring Gippy Grewal, Jaswinder Bhalla, Gurpreet Ghuggi and Binnu Dhillon in lead roles; the group earlier came together for 2012 Punjabi comedy Carry On Jatta. The story is based on the lives of ladiesman Lucky; and his three married friends and how they enhance minor trouble. The film was released on 26 April 2013. The core storyline was loosely based on the 2002 Tamil movie Panchathantiram which itself was inspired by the 1998 movie Very Bad Things.

== Plot ==
Lucky (Gippy Grewal) falls in love with Seerat (Surveen Chawla) and the two later get engaged. Lucky is taken on a vacation for his birthday by his three friends, Dimpy (Binnu Dhillon), Guri (Jaswinder Bhalla) and Jassi (Gurpret Ghuggi). A murder takes place and the four friends are the main suspects in their own eyes. They think they may have killed Sehffy (Sameksha). A funny sequence of events takes place and finally they find out the real killer and who the real victim was.

== Cast ==
- Gippy Grewal as Lucky
- Jaswinder Bhalla as Guri Brar
- Gurpreet Ghuggi as Jassi
- Binnu Dhillon as Dimpy
- Surveen Chawla as Seerat
- Jackie Shroff as Fateh
- Karamjit Anmol as Dimpy's brother in law
- Sameksha as Sheffy
- Roshan Prince as Sunny (cameo)

== Soundtrack ==
| No. | Title | Singer(s) | Length |
|---|---|---|---|
| 1. | "Desi Ganna" | Gippy Grewal | 3:07 |
| 2. | "Dil Tut Na Jave" | Gippy Grewal | 5:09 |
| 3. | "Ishq-E-Da Rog" | Gippy Grewal, Sunidhi Chauhan | 3:17 |
| 4. | "Kach Da Samaan" | Gippy Grewal | 2:31 |
| 5. | "Lucky Di" | Mika Singh | 2:28 |
| 6. | "Sap Keel Lay" | Gippy Grewal | 3:46 |
| 7. | "Whisky" | Gippy Grewal |

== Release ==
The movie was released on the big screens on 26 April, 2013. It also streams on the Ott platform Chaupal.
