= Kande (film) =

- Directed by: Kavi Raz
- Produced by: Rakesh Sharma
- Edited by: Rohit Dhiman
- Music by: Gurmeet Singh; score by Sandeep Saxena
- Production company: VRV Production
- Release date: 11 May 2018
- Running time: 117 minutes
- Country: India
- Language: Punjabi

Kande is an Indian Punjabi-language romantic action comedy movie directed by Kavi Raz and produced by VRV Production. It stars Preet Baath opposite Kamal Virk. The movie opened worldwide on 11 May 2018.

== Plot ==
Jind Kaur is a reputable woman. Chandu Pehlwan, on the other hand, has made a name for himself with his notoriety. Both Chandu Pehlwan and Jind Kaur have had their differences in the past, and those differences are heightened by time. The fight that started in the previous generation takes a toll on the coming generation to obtain their objectives. Both Jind Kaur and Chandu Pehlwan raise their children as they would like themselves to be in their respective world. Mehar (Preet Baath) is the village kabaddi champion, who has lived by every word his mother (Jind Kaur) has taught him. Whereas Baaz is his father's (Chandu Pehlwan) perfect prodigy, learning every dirty trick in the book to defeat the enemy. After losing the village kabaddi championship, the opposing team's captain Baaz takes the loss personally and vows to take his revenge. Mehar gets lost in the labyrinth of addiction which puts a strain on relations and reveals the inner frustrations rising up in everyone's heart.

== Cast ==
- Preet Baath as Mehar
- Kamal Virk as Resham
- Yograj Singh as Chandu Pehlwan
- Sunita Dhir as Jind Kaur
- B. N. Sharma as Daler Singh
- Baaz as Baaz
- Jeet Rudka as Sarpanch
- Jobanpreet Singh as Deepa

== Song list ==
Song	Singer	Lyrics	Music
Pachaan Jatt Di	Nachattar Gill	Baaz	Gurmeet Singh
Thumka	Nachattar Gill, Sonu Kakkar	Baaz	Gurmeet Singh
Bapu De Kille 40	Geeta Zaildar	Baaz	Gurmeet Singh
Kande Title Song	Kanwar Grewal	Baaz	Gurmeet Singh
DJ Waleya	Jasbir Jassi, Tarannum Malik	Baaz	Gurmeet Singh
Tere Naal	Sonu Kakkar, Feroz Khan	Baaz	Gurmeet Singh
