= Binnu Dhillon =

Indian actor

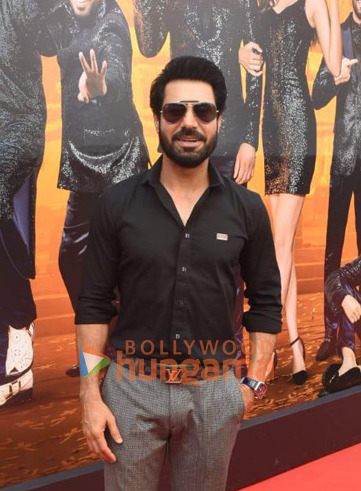
- Dhillon at the media meet of Carry On Jatta 3
- Born: 29 August 1975 (age 51); Dhuri, Punjab, India
- Education: Punjabi University
- Occupations: Actor; stand-up comedian; film producer; television presenter
- Years active: 1996–present
- Organization: Binnu Dhillon Production
- Known for: Comedy
- Spouse: Gurjinder Kaur
- Children: 2

Binnu Dhillon (born 29 August 1975) is an Indian actor who is known for his roles in Punjabi and Hindi films .

== Early life and education ==
Dhillon was born on 29 August 1975 in Dhuri, Sangrur, Punjab. He went on to attend Guru Teg Bahadur Public School. He did his post-graduate degree in theatre and television from Punjabi University, Patiala.

== Personal life ==
Dhillon is married to Gurjinder Kaur and has two daughters.

== Career ==
Binnu Dhillon began his career as a Bhangra performer and had an opportunity to perform at the Indian Festivals in Germany and the UK, he appeared in television and serials before he entered the acting field. He continued to act in plays during his time in university such as a student and as part of the theatre and television department's repertory too.

He made his debut on television with the serial Parchhawain written and directed by Gurbir Singh Grewal in 1998 and went on to work in popular television serials Sarhad, Lori, Gaoundi Dharti, Sirnaave, Man Jeetey Jag Jeet, Channo Chan Vargi, Professor Money Plant, Jugnu Hazir Hai, Jugnu Mast Mast, Padam Paria, Kankaal, Aaste and Pagdandian. He continued to perform in telefilms like Khara Dudh and Khich Ghuggi Khich.

He also played small roles in commercially successful Hindi films like Shaheed-E-Azam and Dev D.

In 2010, he directed a play Naughty Baba in Town that was performed in both US and Canada. Binnu is now one of the most known comedian of Punjabi movies.

Binnu Dhillon rose on the Punjabi comedy scene with films like Carry On Jatta, Sirphire, Raula Pai Gaya, Tu Mera 22 Main Tera 22, Lucky Di Unlucky Story, Rangeelay and Vekh Baraatan Challiyan.

== Filmography ==
Key
†	Denotes films that have not yet been released

Year	Film	Role	Notes
2002	Shaheed-E-Azam		Hindi language film
2005	Nalaik		
2007	Mitti Wajaan Maardi		
2007	Kaun Kise Da Beli	Jeona	
2009	Dev.D	Dwij Dhillon	Hindi language Film
2009	Tera Mera Ki Rishta	Shingara	
2009	Munde UK De	Jaile Brar	
2009	Lagda Ishq Hogaya	Sarjeet Naggar	
2009	Love U Bobby		
2010	Ekam - Son of Soil	Bhagat	
2010	Akh Labdi	Harjit	
2010	Mel Karade Rabba	Taari	Cameo
2010	Chhevan Dariya	Ranjit	
2011	Jihne Mera Dil Luteya	Karanveer	
2012	Mirza – The Untold Story	Diler Singh	
2012	Taur Mittran Di	Dulla	
2012	Kabaddi Once Again	Kirpal 'Clutch' Singh	
2012	Carry On Jatta	Goldy Dhillon	
2012	Sirphire	Happy Singh	
2012	Yaar Pardesi	Tarsem Singh	
2012	Raula Pai Gaya	Sunny	
2012	Saadi Wakhri Hai Shaan	Raunak	
2012	Munde Patiala De	Mama Ji	
2013	Tu Mera 22 Main Tera 22	Sher Singh	
2013	Singh vs Kaur	Taari	
2013	Lucky Di Unlucky Story	Dimpi	
2013	Rangeelay	Titli	
2013	Jatts in Golmaal	Titoo	
2013	Oye Hoye Pyar Ho Gaya	Chamkila	
2013	Best of Luck	Happy	
2013	Naughty Jatts	Laali	
2013	Punjab Bolda		
2013	Jatt Airways	Inspector Hukum Singh	
2013	Viyah 70 Km	Lakha	
2014	Ishq Brandy	Pritam	As a Lead
2014	Mr & Mrs 420	Deputy / Neeru / Japji	Lead role
2014	Oh My Pyo	Binnu	As a Lead
2014	Goreyan Nu Daffa Karo	Mann Sahib	
2015	What the Jatt!!	Daljeet	
2015	Angrej	Aslam	
2015	Munde Kamaal De	Tinku	
2015	Dildariyaan	Bus Conductor	
2016	Channo Kamli Yaar Di	Taaji	Lead role
2016	Love Punjab	Naseem	
2016	Ambarsariya	SHO Hakam Singh	
2016	Vaisakhi List	Minister	
2016	Dulla Bhatti Wala	Dara	
2016	Bambukat	Resham Singh	
2017	Vekh Baraatan Challiyan	Jaggi Waraich	Lead role
2017	Bailaras	Jagga	• Lead role • Co-producer also
2018	Carry On Jatta 2	Goldy Dhillon	
2018	Vadhayiyaan Ji Vadhayiyaan	Pargat	•Lead role • Co-producer also
2018	Mar Gaye Oye Loko	Gill Bai	
2018	Yamla Pagla Deewana Phir Se	Billa	
2019	Kala Shah Kala	Lovely ‘Naag	•As a Lead
2019	Naukar Vahuti Da	Shivinder / Satnam Singh	•Double role •Lead role
2019	Band Vaaje	Inder	Lead role
2019	Jhalle		• Lead role •Also Producer As a Lead Actor
2021	Jinne Jamme Saare Nikamme	Barinder Singh	
2021	Fuffad Ji	Arjan Singh	
2023	Gol Gappe	Jaggi	
2023	Carry on Jatta 3	Goldy Dhillon	
2023	Maujaan Hi Maujaan		
2023	Gaddi Jaandi Ae Chalaangaan Maardi	Barinder Singh "Bhola"	
2025	Fateh	Sandhu	Hindi Language film
2025	Pind Peya Saara Jombieland Baneya	Jatinder Singh / Jeeti	
2026	Bambukat 2	Resham Singh	
