= Diljit Dosanjh discography =

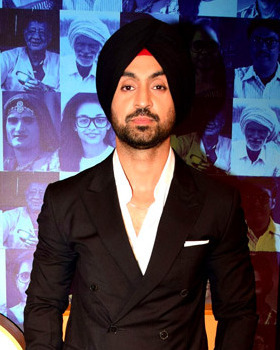
- Studio albums: 13
- EPs: 1
- Singles: 41
- As exec. producer: 1

Indian singer Diljit Dosanjh has released 13 studio albums, 1 extended play, and 41 singles. In 2020, he entered the Social 50 chart by Billboard, following the release of his 11th album G.O.A.T. The album also entered the top 20 in the Canadian Albums Chart. His 12th album MoonChild Era charted at number 32 on the Canadian Albums Chart.

== Albums ==
=== Studio albums ===
Title	Album details	Peak chart positions				Music
Title	Album details	AUS	CAN	NZ	UK Digital	Music
DIL	Released: 2002; Label: Finetone (India); Formats: CD, digital download, streaming	—	—	—	—	Sukhpal Sukh (India)
Ishq Da Uda Adaa	Released: 2002; Label: Newtek Music Co (Canada); Formats: CD, digital download, streaming	—	—	—	—	Babloo Mahendra
Haysha (UK)	Released: 2004; Label: Kiss (UK); Formats: CD, digital download, streaming	—	—	—	—	Sukhpal Sukh (India) Steve Singhfello (UK)
Smile (India & Canada) Over Exposure (UK)	Released: 2 May 2005; Label: Finetone (India), Saahil Music (UK), Planet (Canada); Formats: CD, digital download, streaming	—	—	—	—	Sukhpal Sukh
Ishq Ho Gaya	Released: 2006; Label: Finetone (India & Canada); Formats: CD, digital download, streaming	—	—	—	—	Sachin Ahuja
Chocolate	Released: 14 February 2008; Label: Speed (India), Planet (Canada), VIP Music (UK); Formats: CD, digital download, streaming	—	—	—	—	Pavneet Birgi
The Next Level	Released: 22 August 2009; Label: T-Series; Formats: CD, digital download, streaming	—	—	—	—	Yo Yo Honey Singh
Sikh	Released: 27 April 2012; Label: Speed; Formats: CD, digital download, streaming	—	—	—	—	JSL, NG, Amandeep Singh
Back 2 Basics	Released: 1 November 2012; Label: Moviebox (UK), Speed (India); Formats: CD, digital download, streaming	—	—	—	87	Tru Skool
Con.Fi.Den.Tial	Released: 26 February 2018; Label: T-Series; Formats: CD, digital download, streaming	—	—	—	31	Snappy
Roar	Released: 18 December 2018; Label: Famous Studios; Format: Digital download, streaming	—	—	—	81	Jatinder Shah
G.O.A.T.	Released: 29 July 2020; Label: Self-released; Format: Digital download, streaming	—	16	—	47	Various
MoonChild Era	Released: 22 August 2021; Label: Self-released; Format: Digital download, streaming	—	32	—	41	Intense
Ghost	Released: 29 September 2023; Label: Diljit Dosanjh; Format: Digital download, streaming	—	5	24	24	Thiarajxtt, Intense
Aura	Released: 15 October 2025; Label: Warner Music India; Format: Digital download, streaming	56	39	—	—	MixSingh, Intense, Preet Hundal, Avvy Syra, Offgrid

== Extended plays ==
List of EPs, with release date, label and selected chart positions
Title	EP details	Peak chart positions
Title	EP details	CAN
Urban Legend (with Mickey Singh)	Released: March 1st, 2016; Label: Diljit Dosanjh, Treehouse; Format: Digital download, streaming	
Drive Thru	Released: 15 July 2022; Label: Self-released; Format: Digital download, streaming	39
Advisory	Released: 6 February 2025; Label: Famous Studios; Format: Digital download, streaming	
The Call of Panjab (with Tru Skool)	Released: 23 April 2026; Label: Famous Studios; Format: Digital download, streaming	
I'm an Artist Bro (with Intense)	Released: 4 September 2026; Label: Famous Studios; Format: Digital download, streaming	

== Singles ==
=== As lead artist ===
Title	Year	Music	Peak chart positions				Certifications	Lyrics	Label	Album
Title	Year	Music	CAN	NZ Hot	UK Asian	UK Punjabi	Certifications	Lyrics	Label	Album
"Daka"	2002	Sachin Ahuja	—	—	—	—		Diljit Dosanjh, Raj Kakra, Nimma Lubana, Jaggi, Satta Kotli	T-Series & Finetone	Ishq Ho Gaya
"Smile"	2005	Sukhpal Sukh	—	—	—	—		Balvir Bhoparai	T-Series & Finetone	Smile
"Chocolate"	2008	Pavneet Birgi	—	—	—	—		Jaggi Singh	Times Music	Chocolate
"Soormay Pistolan Waley – Bhagat Singh" (with Yo Yo Honey Singh)	2009	Yo Yo Honey Singh	—	—	—	—		Pirti		Non-album single
"Jatt Bukda Firre"	2009	Bhinda Aujla	—	—	—	—			Kamlee Records Ltd.(UK)	2009 Vich No Tension
"Dil Nachda"	2009	Yo Yo Honey Singh	—	—	—	—		Balvir Boparai	T-Series	The Next Level
"Panga" (with Yo Yo Honey Singh)	2009	Yo Yo Honey Singh	—	—	—	—		Pirti Silon	T-Series	The Next Level
"Desi Daaru"	2009	Yo Yo Honey Singh	—	—	—	—		Pirti Silon	T-Series	The Next Level
"Los Angelas [sic] (LA)" (featuring Yo Yo Honey Singh)	2009	Yo Yo Honey Singh	—	—	—	—		Pirti Silon	T-Series	The Next Level
"Dance with Me" (featuring Yo Yo Honey Singh)	2009	Yo Yo Honey Singh	—	—	—	—		Yo Yo Honey Singh	UK Punjabi Studios	Non-album single
"Punjabi Munde" (featuring Deep Cold)	2010	Jaidev Kumar	—	—	—	—		Jaggi Singh, Kamla Punjabi	Tips Music	Mel Karade Rabba
"Battle Of Mundeer " (featuring Yo Yo Honey Singh)	2010	Yo Yo Honey Singh, Raftaar, Lil Golu, Ikka Singh & Alfaaz	—	—	—	—		Yo Yo Honey Singh	Mafia Mundeer	International Villager
"Dubb Ch Revalver"	2010	Jassi Brothers	—	—	—	—		Pirti Selio	T-Series	Ral Bhangra Payiye
"Warrant"	2011	Jaidev Kumar	—	—	—	—		Tejpal Mizaj	T-Series	Dharti
"Lak 28 Kudi Da" (featuring Yo Yo Honey Singh)	2011	Bachan Bedil	—	—	—	—		Yo Yo Honey Singh	Speed Records	The Lion of Punjab
"Jithe Ho Jive Khade" (with Gippy Grewal)	2011	Bhinda Aujla	—	—	—	—		Kala Nizampuri	Tips Music	Jihne Mera Dil Luteya
"Jhanjhar" (with Gippy Grewal & Gurlez Akhtar)	2011	Bhinda Aujla	—	—	—	—		Jaggi Singh	Tips Music	Jihne Mera Dil Luteya
"Chustiyan"	2011	Sachin Ahuja	—	—	—	—		Sachin Ahuja		Non-album singles
"Kale Kale Suit "	2011	Raftaar & Bohemia	—	—	—	—		Veet Baljeet	Urban Pendu	Non-album singles
"Miss Lonely" (featuring Ikka)	2012	JSL Singh	—	—	—	—		Ikka	Diljit Dosanjh	Non-album singles
"Bodyguard – Gaddafi Song"	2012	Joy Atul	—	—	—	—		Veet Baljeet	T-Series	Bhangra Paa Mittra
"Gobind De Lal"	2012	Amandeep Singh	—	—	—	—		Jaggi Singh	Lokdhun Punjabi	Sikh
"Nanki Da Veer"	2012	Amandeep Singh	—	—	—	—		Jaggi Singh	Lokdhun Punjabi	Sikh
"Fatto"	2012	Jatinder Shah	—	—	—	—		Kumaar	Speed Records	Jatt & Juliet
"Kharku"	2012	Tru Skool	—	—	1	—		Veet Baljit	Speed Records	Back 2 Basics
"Radio"	2012	Tru Skool	—	—	5	—		Kumaar	Speed Records	Back 2 Basics
"Truck"	2012	Tru Skool	—	—	23	—		Veet Baljit	Speed Records	Back 2 Basics
"Aaja Bhangra Pa Laiye"	2012	Jaidev Kumar	—	—	—	—		Kumaar	Eros Now Music	Saadi Love Story soundtrack
"Main Fan Bhagat Singh Da"	2013	JSL Singh	—	—	—	—		Ikka	Sony Music	Bikkar Bai Senti Mental soundtrack
"Shoulder"	2013	Jatinder Shah	—	—	9	—		Kumaar	Speed Records	Jatt & Juliet 2
"Mr Singh"	2013	Jatinder Shah	—	—	12	—		Kumaar	Speed Records	Jatt & Juliet 2
"Proper Patola" (with Badshah)	2013	Badshah & Sachh	—	—	—	—		Badshah	Sony Music Vevo	Non-album singles
"ELTT – The Judai Song"	2013	JSL Singh	—	—	—	—		Ikka	Diljit Dosanjh	Non-album singles
"Soorma"	2014	Sachin Ahuja	—	—	1	—		Jagroop Sarbha	Speed Records	Non-album singles
"RayBan"	2014	Millind Gaba	—	—	—	—		Ikka	Diljit Dosanjh	Non-album singles
"Kamm Sardara Da (Work of Warriors)"	2014	Tejwant Kittu	—	—	6	—		Traditional	Dharam Seva	Work of Warriors
"Beautiful Billo"	2014	Jatinder Shah	—	—	16	—		Ikka	Speed Records & Lokdhun Punjabi	Disco Singh
"Sweeto"	2014	Jatinder Shah	—	—	3	—			Speed Records & Lokdhun Punjabi	Disco Singh
"Happy Birthday"	2014	Jatinder Shah	—	—	7	—			Speed Records & Lokdhun Punjabi	Disco Singh
"Laatu"	2014	Jatinder Shah	—	—	31	—			Speed Records & Lokdhun Punjabi	Disco Singh
"Rangrut"	2014	Gurmeet Singh	—	—	13	—		Jagvir Sohi	Speed Records	Punjab 1984
"Channo"	2014		—	—	10	—			Speed Records	Punjab 1984
"Swaah Ban Ke"	2014		—	—	15	—			Speed Records	Punjab 1984
"Kismat"	2014		—	—	12	—			Speed Records	Punjab 1984
"Selfie"	2014	Millind Gaba	—	—	—	—		Ikka	Diljit Dosanjh	Non-album singles
"This Singh Is So Stylish" (featuring Ikka)	2014	Intense	—	—	—	—		Ikka	Diljit Dosanjh, MTV Spoken Word	Non-album singles
"Holla Holla"	2014	Millind Gaba	—	—	—	—		Ikka	Diljit Dosanjh	Non-album singles
"Patiala Peg"	2014	Nick Dhammu	—	—	1	—		Veet Baljeet	Speed Records	Non-album singles
"Singh Naal Jodi" (with Sukhshinder Shinda	2014	Sukhshinder Shinda	—	—	—	—		Koki Deep	T-Series	Collaboration 3
"Ishq Hazir Hai"	2015	Mickey Singh	—	—	1	—		Mickey Singh, Diljit	Filmy Shots	Non-album singles
"Jatt Fire Karda"	2015	Preet Hundal	—	—	1	—		Amrit Maan	Paan-Aab Records	Non-album singles
"Faiz-E-Noor"	2015	Joy Atul	—	—	14	—		Traditional	Dharam Seva	Non-album singles
"I Love U Ji"	2015	Nick Dhammu	—	—	39	—		Veet Baljeet	Speed Records	Sardaar Ji
"Time"	2015	"Jatinder Shah"	—	—	30	—		Veet Baljeet	Speed Records	Sardaar Ji
"Sardaar Ji"	2015	"Jatinder Shah"	—	—	7	—		Veet Baljeet	Speed Records	Sardaar Ji
"Veervaar" (featuring Tarunam)	2015	"Jatinder Shah"	—	—	1	—		Ranbir Sandhu	Speed Records	Sardaar Ji
"AK-47"	2015	"Jatinder Shah"	—	—	—	—		Veet Baljit	Speed Records	Hero Naam Yaad Rakhi
"Shoon Shaan"	2015	JSL Singh	—	—	—	—		Ikka	Eros Now Music	Mukhtiar Chadha
"Ki Banu Duniya Da" (with Gurdas Maan)	2015	Jatinder Shah	—	—	1	—		Gurdas Maan	Coke Studio India (season 4)	
"Sewa Nanaksar Di"	2015	Bear Minister	—	—	—	—		Veet Baljeet	Next Level Music	
"5 Taara"	2015	Jatinder Shah	—	—	1	—		Ranveer Sandhu	Speed Records	
"Supremacy of Khalsa"	2016	Nick Dhammu	—	—	—	—		Ranveer Sandhu	Dharam Seva	
"You Think"	2016	Jatinder Shah	—	—	16	—		Deep Arraicha	Tips Music	Ambarsariya soundtrack
"Pagg Wala Munda"	2016	Jatinder Shah	—	—	—	—		Happy Raikoti	Tips Music	Ambarsariya soundtrack
"Poplin / Pappleen"	2016	Jatinder Shah	—	—	2	—		Veet Baljit	Speed Records	Sardaar Ji 2 soundtrack
"Do You Know"	2016	B Praak	—	—	1	—		Jaani	Famous Studios	
"Dhan Guru Nanak"	2016	Jassi Brothers	—	—	—			Veet Baljit	White Hill Music	
"Laembadgini"	2016	Jatinder Shah	—	—	3	—		Veet Baljit	Speed Records	
"Kalliyan Kulliyan"	2017	Jatinder Shah	—	—	24	—		Ranbir Singh	Zee Music	Super Singh soundtrack
"El Sueño"	2017	Tru Skool	—	—	2	—		Lally Mundi	Famous Studios	
"Raat Di Gedi"	2017	Jatinder Shah	—	—	3	—		Ranveer Sandhu	Speed Records	
"High End Gaddiyan"	2018	Snappy	—	—	1	—		Rav Hanjra	T-Series	Confidential
"Big Scene"	2018	Snappy	—	—	—	—		Rav Hanjra	T-Series	Confidential
"Roti"	2018	Jatinder Shah	—	—	—	—		Rav Hanjra	Speed Records	Sajjan Singh Rangroot soundtrack
"Putt Jatt Da" (featuring Kaater)	2018	Archie	—	—	1	—		Ikka	Speed Records	Non-album singles
"Pagal"	2018	Goldboy	—	—	14	—		Babbu	Speed Records	Non-album singles
"Aar Nanak Paar Nanak"	2018	Gurmoh	—	—	—	—		Harmanjeet	White Hill Music	Non-album singles
"Jind Mahi"	2018	Manni Sandhu	—	—	1	—		Gurnazar Chattha	Famous Studios	Non-album singles
"Gulabi Pagg"	2018	Jatinder Shah	—	—	6	—		Ranbir Singh	Famous Studios	Roar
"Thug Life"	2018	Jatinder Shah	—	—	10	—		Ranbir Singh	Famous Studios	Roar
"Gabru Nu"	2019	Rishie Rich	—	—	17	—		Ikka Singh	Famous Studios	
"Kylie & Kareena"	2019	Money Musik, Manu, XD Pro	—	—	17	—		Tej Gill, Money Musik, Herman Atwal	Famous Studios	
"Mehfil"	2019	V Rakx Music	—	—	—	—		Rav Hanjra	Zee Music Company	Shadaa soundtrack
"Mood"	2019	Snappy	—	—	28	—		Rav Hanjra	Famous Studios	
"Muchh"	2019	The Boss	—	—	7	—		Kaptaan	Saga Music	
"Nanak Aadh Jugaadh Jiyo"	2019	Grumoh	—	—	—	—		Harmanjeet	Rhythm Boyz	
"Surma"	2019	Jatinder Shah	—	—	18	9		Sukh Sandhu	Sony Music	
"Stranger" (featuring Simar Kaur)	2020	Mofusion	—	—	—	—		Alfaaz	YRF	
"G.O.A.T"	2020	G.Funk	—	—	1	1		Karan Aujla	Diljit Dosanjh (Famous Studios)	G.O.A.T.
"Clash"	2020	The Kidd	—	—	3	2		Raj Ranjodh	Diljit Dosanjh (Famous Studios)	G.O.A.T.
"Peed"	2020	Gupz Sehra	—	—	2	2		Raj Ranjodh	Diljit Dosanjh (Famous Studios)	G.O.A.T.
"Born to Shine"	2020	Desi Crew	—	—	—	—		Amrit Maan	Diljit Dosanjh (Famous Studios)	G.O.A.T.
"Welcome to My Hood"	2020	Flamme	—	—	16	14		Kharewala Brar (Manjinder Brar)	Diljit Dosanjh (Famous Studios)	Non-album singles
"RiRi"	2021	Intense	—	—	6	3		Raj Ranjodh	Diljit Dosanjh (Famous Studios)	Non-album singles
"Umbrella" (with Intense)	2021	Intense	—	—	3	2	MC: Gold	Chani Nattan	Double Up Entertainment	Non-album singles
"Lover"	2021	Intense	—	—	9	5	MC: Gold	Raj Ranjodh	Diljit Dosanjh (Famous Studios)	Moon Child Era
"Black & White"	2021	Intense	—	—	11	6	MC: Gold	Raj Ranjodh	Diljit Dosanjh (Famous Studios)	Moon Child Era
"Vibe"	2021	Intense	—	—	2	1	MC: Gold	Raj Ranjodh	Diljit Dosanjh (Famous Studios)	Moon Child Era
"Luna"	2021	Intense	—	—	—	12		Arjan Dhillon	Diljit Dosanjh (Famous Studios)	Moon Child Era
"Number 5"	2021	Intense	—	—	—	—		Raj Ranjodh	Tips Punjabi	Honsla Rakh soundtrack
"Sher"	2021	Yeah Proof	—	—	38	—		Laddi Chahal	Tips Punjabi	Honsla Rakh soundtrack
"Dihaan Dhar Mehsoos Kar"	2021	Gurmoh	—	—	—	—		Harmanjeet	Diljit Dosanjh (Famous Studios)	Non-album singles
"What Ve" (with Nimrat Khaira)	2021	Desi Crew	—	—	23	—		Arjan Dhillon	Diljit Dosanjh (Famous Studios)	Non-album singles
"Unforgettable"	2021	Intense	—	—	22	9		Chani Nattan	Double Up Entertainment	Non-album singles
"Chauffeur" (with Tory Lanez)	2022	Ikky	32	8	3	1	MC: Gold	Jangdip Singh Dhillon & Sandor Schwisberg	Warner Music	Non-album singles
"Peaches"	2022	Intense	—	31	1	1		Raj Ranjodh	Diljit Dosanjh (Famous Studios)	Drive Thru
"Lemonade"	2022	Intense	—	—	7	6	MC: Gold	Raj Ranjodh	Diljit Dosanjh (Famous Studios)	Drive Thru
"Caviar"	2022	Intense	—	—	—	11		Raj Ranjodh	Diljit Dosanjh (Famous Studios)	Drive Thru
"Red Chilli"	2022	Intense	—	—	6	5		Raj Ranjodh	Diljit Dosanjh (Famous Studios)	Drive Thru
"Vanilla"	2022	Intense	—	—	—	9		Chani Nattan	Diljit Dosanjh (Famous Studios)	Drive Thru
"Peaches" (featuring Anne-Marie)	2022	Intense, Cameron Gower Poole	—	—	—	—	MC: Gold	Raj Ranjodh, Anne-Marie	Diljit Dosanjh (Famous Studios)	Drive Thru
"Chauffeur" (JBee Remix) (with JBee featuring Tory Lanez)	2022	Ikky	—	—	—	—		Jangdip Singh Dhillon, JBee & Sandor Schwisberg	Warner Music	
"Koka"	2022	Avvy Sran	—	—	25	13		Raj Ranjodh	Saregama Music	Babe Bhangra Paunde Ne soundtrack
"Jugni" (with Diamond Platnumz)	2022	Salim Kasimu Maengo	—	—	11	10		Laddi Chahal, Diamond Platnumz	Warner Music, Diljit Dosanjh	
"Balle Jatta"	2022	Intense	—	—	—	18		Raj Ranjodh	Diljit Dosanjh	
"Nanak Ji"	2022	Bhai Manna Singh	—	—	—	—		Bir Singh	Diljit Dosanjh	
"Challa" (with Gurdas Maan)	2023	Ikky	—	—	—	—		Gurdas Maan	Gurdas Maan & Diljit Dosanjh	
"Jodi Teri Meri" (with Nimrat Khaira)	2023	Tru Skool	—	—	—	—		Raj Ranjodh	Rhythm Boys	Jodi soundtrack
"What Ve" (with Nimrat Khaira)	2023	Desi Crew						Arjan Dhillon	Tips Punjab	Phir Mel Karade Rabba soundtrack
"Palpita" (with Camilo)	2023	Jon Leone	—	—	—	—		Camilo, Indrr Bajwa	Sony Music Latin (Coke Studio)	
"Feel My Love"	2023	Intense	—	—	—	11		Raj Ranjodh	Diljit Dosanjh	Ghost
"Case"	2023	Intense	53	19	13	6	MC: Gold	Raj Ranjodh	Diljit Dosanjh	Ghost
"Lalkara" (featuring Sultaan)	2023	Intense	—	21	—	13	MC: Gold	Raj Ranjodh, Sultaan	Diljit Dosanjh	Ghost
"Hass Hass" (with Sia)	2023	Greg Kurstin	37	6	2	1		D.Dosanjh, Sia Furler, Inder Bajwa	Warner Music	
"Ghost"	2023	Thiarajxtt	—	—	—	16		Jassajxtt	Diljit Dosanjh	Ghost
"Jatt Vailly"	2023	Thiarajxtt	—	—	—	—			Diljit Dosanjh	Ghost
"Rooh Vairagan"	2023		—	—	—	—			Diljit Dosanjh	
"Psychotic"	2023	Thiarajxtt	—	—	—	—			Diljit Dosanjh	Ghost
"Whatcha Doin"	2023	Thiarajxtt	—	—	—	—			Diljit Dosanjh	Ghost
"Love Ya"	2024	Hunny Bunny	—	—	—	—				
"Magic"	2024	Thiarajxtt	—	—	—	—				
"Khutti" (with Saweetie)	2024	Raj Ranjodh	—	32	—	—		Raj Ranjodh, Saweetie, Price	Diljit Dosanjh	
"Muhammad Ali" (with NLE Choppa)	2024		—	26	—	—				
"Water"	2024	MixSingh	—	—	—	—		Raj Ranjodh, Sukhchain Sandhu	Diljit Dosanjh	
"Ranjha" (with Sia and David Guetta)	2026		—	24	—	—				
"Dealer"	2026		62	—	—	—				
"Morni" (with Chani Nattan and Tru Skool)	2026		100	—	—	—				

=== As featured artist ===
Title	Year	Music	Peak chart position		Lyrics	Label	Album
Title	Year	Music	UK Asian	UK Punjabi	Lyrics	Label	Album
"Goliyaan" (Yo Yo Honey Singh featuring Diljit Dosanjh)	2011	Yo Yo Honey Singh	—	—	Alfaaz	Speed Records	International Villager
"V.I.P" (Raj Ranjodh featuring Diljit Dosanjh)	2022	Yeah Proof	23	14	Raj Ranjodh	Crazy Production	Non-album single
"Jagga Jatt" (Ikka featuring Diljit Dosanjh & Badshah)	2024	Sez on the Beat	—	—	Ikka, Badshah	T-Series	Only Love Gets Reply
"Buck" (Jackson Wang featuring Diljit Dosanjh)	2025	Jackson Wang, Dem Jointz			Raj Ranjodh, Alexis Andrea Boyd, Jackson Wang	TEAM WANG	Magic Man 2
"Pokito" (Daddy Yankee featuring Diljit Dosanjh)	2026	OMB, Xound, Luny Tunes, Jeremy Ayala			Daddy Yankee, Diljit Dosanjh	DY Records	La Postal

== Other charted songs ==
List of other charted songs, with selected chart positions
Title	Year	Peak chart positions				Album
Title	Year	CAN	NZ Hot	UK Asian	UK Punjabi	Album
"Poppin'"	2023	—	—	—	14	Ghost
"Amiri"	2023	—	—	—	18	Ghost
"Jatt Vailly"	2023	54	15	9	3	Ghost
"Whatcha Doin'"	2023	—	31	23	9	Ghost
"Kinni Kinni"	2023	—	—	—	17	Ghost
"Daytona"	2023	—	—	—	20	Ghost
"Amiri"	2023	—	—	—	18	Ghost

== Soundtrack contributions ==
=== Punjabi ===
Title	Year	Songs	Music	Notes
Mel Karade Rabba	2010	"Punjabi Munde"	Jaidev Kumar	
Dharti	2011	"Warrant"	Jaidev Kumar	Cameo
The Lion of Punjab	2011	"Lak 28 Kudi Da, "Ishq Tilasmi Jaadu", "Gore Gore", "Lions Of Punjab", "Wow Wow"	Yo Yo Honey Singh	
Jihne Mera Dil Luteya (with Bhinda Aujla & Gippy Grewal)	2011	"Fukre", "Jithe Ho Jiye Khadde", "Jhanjhar" "Supna", "Aakadd Dikhawe"	Yo Yo Honey Singh, Bhinda Aujla	
Jatt & Juliet	2012	"Fatto", "HiFi Juliet", "Kudiye Mind Na Kari" "Bachaa, ""Main Jaagan Swere"	Jatinder Shah	
Saadi Love Story (with Amrinder Gill)	2012	"Aaja Bhangra Pa Laiye", "Laltain Nachdi"	Jaidev Kumar	
Bikkar Bai Sentimental	2013	"Main Fan Bhagat Singh Da"	JSL Singh	Cameo
Jatt & Juliet 2	2013	"Police", "Shoulder", "Suited Booted", "Bhugi", "Mr.Singh"	Jatinder Shah	
Disco Singh	2014	"Ae Ji Oo Ji", "Beautiful Billo", "Disco Singh", "Happy Birthday" "Lattu", "Sweeto"	Jatinder Shah	
Punjab 1984	2014	"Rangrut", "Swaah Ban Ke", "Kismat", "Channo", "Ammi Udeek Ki", "Sodha Laun Nu"	Nick Dhamu, Gurmeet Singh	
Sardaar Ji	2015	"I Love U Ji", "Sardaarji", "Taare Mutiyare", "Time", "Veervaar"	Jatinder Shah, Nick Dhammu	
Hero Naam Yaad Rakhi	2015	"AK-47"	Jatinder Shah	
Mukhtiar Chadha	2015	"Shoon Shaan", "Click Click", "Gapuchi Gapuchi", "Gum Gum" "Gun Vargi Bolian Pave", "Kol Kinare"	JSL Singh	
Ambarsariya	2016	"Pagg Wala Munda", "Ju Think"	Jatinder Shah	
Sardaar Ji 2	2016	"Desi Daaru", "Mitran Da Junction", "Pappleen/Poplin", "Razamand", "Sardaarji", "Rumaal"	Jatinder Shah, Nick Dhammu	
Super Singh	2017	"Hawa Vich", "Kalliyan Kulliyan", "Ho Gaya Talli" "Glorious Gallan"	Jatinder Shah	
Sajjan Singh Rangroot	2018	"Roti", "Sajjna", "Pyaas", "Peepa", "Mera Ki Mareya"	Jatinder Shah, Uttam Singh	
Shadaa	2019	"Shadaa Title Song", "Expensive", "Mehndi", "Mehfil", "Mor"	Nick Dhammu, JSL Singh and V Rakx Music	
Honsla Rakh	2021	"Chanel No 5", "Sher", "Lallkara", "Suroor", "Honsla Rakh (Title Track)"	Avvy Sra, Mix Singh, JSL, Intense, Yeah Proof	
Babe Bhangra Paunde Ne	2022	"Koka", "Babe Bhangra Paunde Ne (Title Track)", "Nazaare", "Hass K Kude"	Avvy Sra	
Jodi	2023	"Jigra Te Laija Gabrua", "Jodi Teri Meri", "Chan Wargi", "Meri Kalam Na bole", "Jatt Di Jaan", "Akhiri Salaam", "Gal Kise Di", "Parohna Banke", "Lalkaare Jatt De", "Jatt Jaati Saati"	Tru Skool	
Jatt & Juliet 3	2024	"Tu Juliet Jatt Di", "Haye Juliet", "Sheraan Da", "Lehnga"	Bunny	

=== Hindi films ===
Title	Year	Track	Co-artist(s)	Music	Note
Tere Naal Love Ho Gaya	2012	"Pee Pa Pee Pa Ho Gaya"	Priya Saraiya	Sachin-Jigar	Also featured in the song
Mere Dad Ki Maruti	2013	"Mere Dad Ki Maruti"	Sachin Gupta	Sachin Gupta	
Yamla Pagla Deewana 2	2013	"Aidaan Hi Nachna"	Dharmendra, Sunny Deol, Bobby Deol, Karan Deol, Sachin Gupta	Sachin Gupta	
Singh is Bling	2015	"Tung Tung Baje"	Nooran Sisters	Sneha Khanwalkar	
Udta Punjab	2016	"Ikk Kudi (Reprised Version)"	Solo	Amit Trivedi	Also as an actor
Udta Punjab	2016	"Ikk Kudi (Club Mix)"	Alia Bhatt	Amit Trivedi	Also as an actor
Phillauri	2017	"Naughty Billy"	Nakash Aziz, Anushka Sharma, Shilpi Paul	Shashwat Sachdev	Also as an actor
Phillauri	2017	"Dum Dum (Reprise)"	Solo	Shashwat Sachdev	Also as an actor
Noor	2017	"Move Your Lakk"	Badshah, Sonakshi Sharma	Badshah	Also featured in the song
Raabta	2017	Sadda Move	Raftaar, Pradeep Singh	Pritam	
Jab Harry Met Sejal	2017	"Raula"	Neeti Mohan	Pritam	
Soorma	2018	"Ishq Di Baajiyan"	Solo	Shankar-Ehsaan-Loy	Also as an actor
Welcome to New York	2018	Pant Mein Gun	Sajid-Wajid		Also as an actor
Namaste England	2018	"Proper Patola (Remake)"	Astha Gill, Badshah	Badshah, Diljit Dosanjh	
Arjun Patiala	2019	"Dil Todeya"	Solo	Guru Randhawa, Sachin-Jigar	Also as an actor
Good Newwz	2019	"Sauda Khara Khara"	Sukhbir, Dhvani Bhanushali	Sukhbir, DJ Chetas-Lijo George	Also as an actor
Shehzada	2023	"Munda Sona Hoon Main"	Nikhita Gandhi	Pritam	
Dunki	2023	"Banda"	Solo	Pritam	
Crew	2024	"Naina"	Badshah	Raj Ranjodh	Also as an actor
Crew	2024	"Choli Ke Peeche"	Alka Yagnik, Ila Arun, IP Singh	Laxmikant-Pyarelal, Akshay-IP	Also as an actor
Kalki 2898 AD	2024	"Bhairava Anthem"	Vijaynarain	Santhosh Narayanan	Also featured in the song
Jigra	2024	"Chal Kudiye"	Alia Bhatt	Manpreet Singh	Also featured in the song
Bhool Bhulaiyaa 3	2024	"Bhool Bhulaiyaa"	Neeraj Shridhar, Pitbull	Tanishk Bagchi, Pritam	
Baby John	2024	"Nain Matakka"	Dhee	Thaman S	Also featured in the song
The Ba***ds of Bollywood	2025	"Tenu Ki Pata"	Aryan Khan, Ujwal Gupta	Ujwal Gupta	
Dhurandhar	2025	"Ez-Ez"	Hanumankind, Shashwat Sachdev	Shashwat Sachdev, Raj Ranjodh	
Dhurandhar	2025	"Teri Ni Kararan"	Shashwat Sachdev	Lal Chand Yamla Jatt, Shashwat Sachdev	Remake of "Das Main Ki Pyar Wichon Khatyal" by Lal Chand Yamla Jatt
Border 2	2026	"Ghar Kab Aaoge"	Sonu Nigam, Arijit Singh, Vishal Mishra	Mithoon, Anu Malik	Also as an actor
Border 2	2026	"Ishq Da Chehra"	Sachet Tandon, Parampara Tandon	Sachet-Parampara	Also as an actor
Ramayana: Part 1	2026	"Shree Hanuman Chalisa"	Sukhwinder Singh, Mohit Chauhan, Shankar Mahadevan, Kailash Kher	A. R. Rahman	

=== Hindi singles ===
Album	Year	Track	Co-artist(s)	Music	Note
Gangster 2	2012	"Goliyan"	Yo Yo Honey Singh	Pritam	
Fraud No.1	2013	"Nachna"		Pritam	
Dune	2016	"Patiala Peg"	-	Amaal Mallik	
Valkyria Chronicles	2017	"Do You Know"	-	Mithoon	
M.I.L.F	2022	"Jugni"	Diamond Platinumz	Sachin-Jigar	

=== Other films ===
Title	Year	Track	Co-artist(s)	Language	Music	Note
Kalki 2898 AD	2024	"Bhairava Anthem"	Deepak Blue, Santhosh Narayanan	Telugu	Santhosh Narayanan	
Kalki 2898 AD (Tamil Dub)	2024	"Bhairava Anthem" (Tamil)	Santhosh Narayanan	Tamil	Santhosh Narayanan	Tamil dub
Kantara: Chapter 1 (Hindi dub)	2025	"Rebel Song"	–	Kannada	B. Ajaneesh Loknath	Hindi dubbed

== As executive producer ==
Year	Title	Artists	Music	Label
2019	Muscle Car	Raj Ranjodh	Byg Byrd	Famous Studios
