= List of awards and nominations received by Diljit Dosanjh =

Diljit Dosanjh awards and nominations
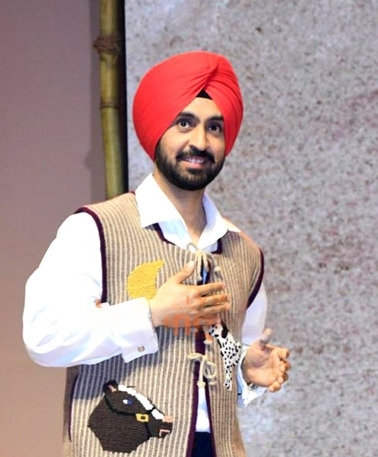
- Dosanjh in 2024
Awards and nominations
Award	Wins	Nominations

Totals (Note: Certain award groups do not simply award one winner. They acknowledge several different recipients, have runners-up, and have third place. Since this is a specific recognition and is different from losing an award, runner-up mentions are considered wins in this award tally. For simplification and to avoid errors, each award in this list has been presumed to have had a prior nomination.)
- Wins: 35
- Nominations: 23

The following is a list of awards and nominations received by Indian actor and singer Diljit Dosanjh. Dosanjh received the Best Actor award from the PTC Punjabi Film Awards and PIFA Awards in 2012. He received the Filmfare Award for Best Male Debut in 2017 for the film Udta Punjab and later received the Filmfare Award Punjabi for Best Actor for the film Ambarsariya.

He won the Most Folk Pop Album award at the PTC Punjabi Music Awards for his 2009 album The Next Level, and in 2012, he won the Most Popular Song of the Year award at the PTC Music Awards for his song "Luck 28 Kudi Da" from the film The Lion of Punjab.

== Awards and nominations ==
Award ceremony	Year	Category	Nominee(s)/work(s)	Result
Brit Asia TV Music Awards	2013	Best Bhangra Single	"Kharku"	Won
Brit Asia TV Music Awards	2013	Best Album of the Year	Back 2 Basics	Won
Brit Asia TV Music Awards	2013	Best International Act	Himself	Won
Brit Asia TV Music Awards	2014	Best International Act	Himself	Won
Brit Asia TV Music Awards	2015	Best World Single	"Patiala Peg"	Won
Brit Asia TV Music Awards	2015	Best Male Act	Himself	Won
Brit Asia TV Music Awards	2017	Best Music Video	"Do You Know"	Won
Brit Asia TV Music Awards	2017	Best Male Act	Himself	Won
Brit Asia TV Music Awards	2018	Album of the Year	CON.FI.DEN.TIAL	Won
IIFA Awards	2020	Best Supporting Actor	Good Newwz	Nominated
Filmfare Awards	2017	Best Male Debut	Udta Punjab	Won
Filmfare Awards	2017	Best Supporting Actor	Udta Punjab	Nominated
Filmfare Awards	2020	Best Supporting Actor	Good Newwz	Nominated
Filmfare Awards Punjabi	2017	Best Actor	Ambarsariya	Won
Mirchi Music Awards	2015	Listeners' Choice Film Song of the Year	"Swaah Banke"	Won
Mirchi Music Awards	2015	Listeners' Choice Film Song of the Year	Punjab 1984	Won
Mirchi Music Awards	2015	Film Album of the Year	Punjab 1984	Won
Mirchi Music Awards	2015	Song of the Year – Non Film	"Patiala Peg"	Won
PIFAA Awards	2012	Best Actor	Jihne Mera Dil Luteya	Won (Note: shared with Gippy Grewal)
PTC Punjabi Film Awards	2012	Best Male Debut	The Lion of Punjab	Nominated
PTC Punjabi Film Awards	2012	Best Actor	The Lion of Punjab	Nominated
PTC Punjabi Film Awards	2012	Best Actor	Jihne Mera Dil Luteya	Won
PTC Punjabi Film Awards	2013	Best Actor	Jatt & Juliet	Won
PTC Punjabi Film Awards	2014	Best Actor	Jatt & Juliet 2	Won
PTC Punjabi Film Awards	2015	Best Actor	Disco Singh	Nominated
PTC Punjabi Film Awards	2015	Best Actor	Punjab 1984	Won
PTC Punjabi Film Awards	2016	Best Actor	Sardaarji	Nominated
PTC Punjabi Film Awards	2017	Best Actor	Ambarsariya	Nominated
PTC Punjabi Film Awards	2018	Best Actor	Super Singh	Nominated
PTC Punjabi Film Awards	2019	Best Actor	Sajjan Singh Rangroot	Nominated
PTC Punjabi Film Awards	2020	Best Actor	Shadaa	Won (Note: shared with Gurpreet Ghuggi)
PTC Punjabi Music Awards	2010	Best Folk Pop Album	The Next Level	Won
PTC Punjabi Music Awards	2012	Best Playback Singer Male	Lak 28 Kudi Da	Nominated
PTC Punjabi Music Awards	2012	Most Popular Song of the Year	Lak 28 Kudi Da	Won
PTC Punjabi Music Awards	2012	Most Popular Song of the Year	Fukre	Nominated
PTC Punjabi Music Awards	2013	Best Playback Singer Male	Bacha Ho Gaya	Nominated
PTC Punjabi Music Awards	2013	Most Popular Song of the Year	Bacha Ho Gaya	Nominated
PTC Punjabi Music Awards	2013	Best Bhangra Song of the Year	Kharku	Won
PTC Punjabi Music Awards	2013	Best Pop Vocalist Male	Kharku	Won
PTC Punjabi Music Awards	2013	Best Album of the Year	Back 2 Basics	Nominated
PTC Punjabi Music Awards	2014	Most Popular Song of the Year	Shoulder	Nominated
PTC Punjabi Music Awards	2014	Best Playback Singer Male	Main Fan Bhagat Singh Da	Nominated
PTC Punjabi Music Awards	2014	Best Pop Vocalist Male	Proper Patola	Won
PTC Punjabi Music Awards	2014	Most Popular Song of the Year	Proper Patola	Won
PTC Punjabi Music Awards	2014	Best Music Video	Proper Patola	Nominated
PTC Punjabi Music Awards	2015	Most Popular Song of the Year	Happy Birthday	Won
PTC Punjabi Music Awards	2015	Best Playback Singer (Male)	Happy Birthday	Nominated
PTC Punjabi Music Awards	2015	Best Playback Singer (Male)	Swaah Banke	Nominated
PTC Punjabi Music Awards	2015	Channo	Most Popular Song of the Year	Nominated
PTC Punjabi Music Awards	2015	Beautiful Billo	Most Popular Song of the Year	Nominated
PTC Punjabi Music Awards	2015	Rangrut	Most Popular Song of the Year	Nominated
PTC Punjabi Music Awards	2015	"Patiala Peg"	Best Pop Vocalist Male for a Single	Won
PTC Punjabi Music Awards	2015	"Patiala Peg"	Best Bhangra Song of the Year	Won
PTC Punjabi Music Awards	2015	"Patiala Peg"	Most Popular Song of the Year	Nominated
PTC Punjabi Music Awards	2016	Taare Mutiyaare	Best Playback Singer (Male)	Nominated
PTC Punjabi Music Awards	2016	Veervaar	Best Playback Singer (Male)	Nominated
PTC Punjabi Music Awards	2016	Veervaar	Most Popular Song of the Year	Won
PTC Punjabi Music Awards	2016	5 Taara	Most Popular Song of the Year	Won
PTC Punjabi Music Awards	2016	5 Taara	Best Bhangra Song of the Year	Won
Zee Cine Awards	2020	Best Actor in a Comic Role	Good Newwz	Won
Filmfare OTT Awards	2024	Best Actor in a Web Original Film – Male	Amar Singh Chamkila	Won
Critics' Choice Awards	2025	Best Actor	Amar Singh Chamkila	Won
