= PIFA =

PIFA or Pifa may refer to:

- PIFA F.C., an Indian football club based in Mumbai
- Pennsylvania Intercollegiate Football Association
- Phenyliodine bis(trifluoroacetate)
- Pifá, the Bactris gasipaes
- Pifa, an instrumental movement from George Frideric Handel's Messiah
- pifa, a hairstyle in hufu fashion
- Planar inverted-F antenna
- Protecting Internet Freedom Act
- Punjabi International Film Academy Awards
- Ivaylo Petrov (footballer born 1973) (born 1973), Bulgarian footballer
