= Vanilla (disambiguation) =

Vanilla is a spice used as a flavoring.

Vanilla may also refer to:

== Botany and biology ==
- Vanilla extract, containing vanillin as the primary ingredient
- Vanilla (genus), a genus of orchids
  - Vanilla planifolia, species providing vanilla flavoring

== Arts and media ==
=== Film and television ===
- Vanilla (2018 film), India, in Kannada language, directed by Jayatheertha
- Vanilla (2025 British film), directed by Joseph A. Adesunloye
- Vanilla (2025 Mexican film), directed by Mayra Hermosillo
- "Vanilla" (Drifters), a 2015 TV episode
- Vanilla Series, a brand of pornographic anime

=== Music ===
- Vanilla (group), a British girl band
- Vanilla (EP), an EP by Eiko Shimamiya
- "Vanilla" (Gackt song)
- "Vanilla" (Leah Dizon song)
- "Vanilla", a 2020 song by Holly Humberstone from Falling Asleep at the Wheel
- "Vanilla", a 2021 song by Lightsum
- "Vanilla", a 2022 song by Diljit Dosanjh

=== Fictional characters ===
- Vanilla, in Asterix
- Vanilla Minaduki, in Nekopara
- Vanilla the Rabbit, in the Sonic the Hedgehog franchise

== People ==
- Vanilla Beane (1919–2022), American milliner and businesswoman
- Vanilla Ice (born 1967), American rapper, actor, and television host
- Vanilla Vargas, Puerto Rican professional wrestler
- Vanilla Yamazaki (born 1978), Japanese actress and choreographer

== Other uses ==
- Plain vanilla, something standard or conventional
  - Vanilla software, computer software which is not customized
  - Vanilla sex, sexual behavior which a culture regards as standard or conventional
- Vanilla (color), a yellow color variation
- Vanilla, Pennsylvania, US
- Vanilla Air, a Japanese airline
- Vanilla Forums, an Internet forum package
- Vanilla Car, a mobile billboard in Japan
