= Inderpal Singh =

Indian actor

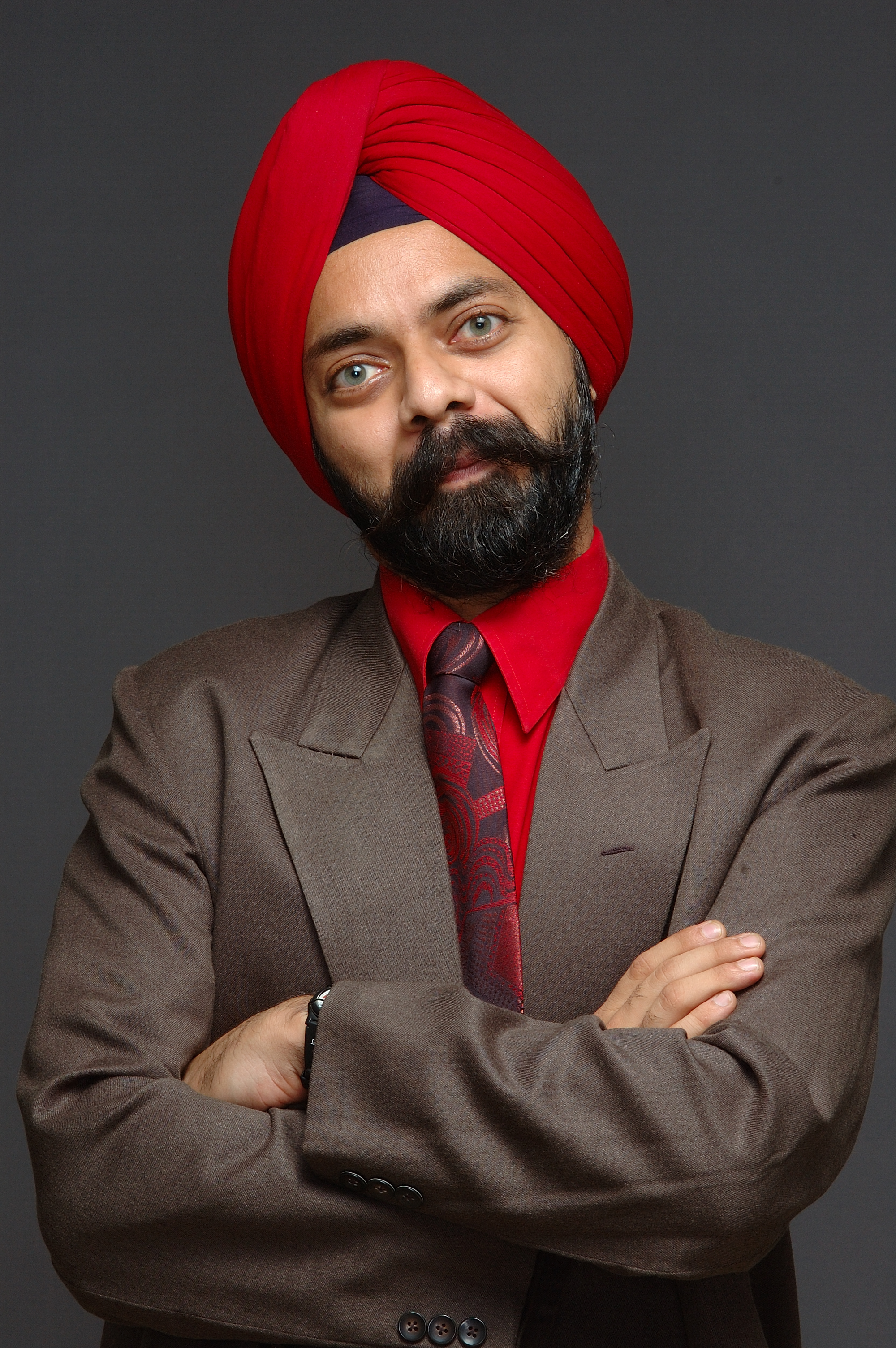
- Actor Inderpal Singh
- Born: Inderpal Singh
- Occupations: Actor television anchor, writer
- Years active: 1990–present
- Parent(s): Mr Ranjit Singh and Mrs Harbans Kaur
- Website: inderpalsingh.in

Inderpal Singh (IPA: [ind̪ərpaːl sɪŋɡ]) is an Indian television anchor, film actor, and writer. He made his film debut in 2006 in Dibakar Banerjee's comedy drama film Khosla Ka Ghosla, which won the National Film Award For Best Feature Film in India. Despite its small budget, upon release the film was a commercial success. Although Inderpal Singh just had a small cameo in the movie, he was later signed up for two bigger budget movies – Vicky Donor as Taya Ji and Besharam as Bhura Paaji.

== Early life and education ==
Inderpal Singh is a native of Delhi and he completed schooling from Mumbai, Jammu and Delhi. He graduated in BSc (PCM) from SGTB Khalsa College, Delhi University. In 1996, he completed Masters in Finance and Control from Panjab University, Chandigarh. Inderpal Singh has conceptualised and enacted in various commercial series. He played a character INDyeah Singh, who made people aware of India's history.

=== Television and early career ===
Inderpal Singh started his career as television actor. He started a program named Nikke Nikke Hasse which was broadcast on ETC Punjabi in 2009 Channel. The program aimed at instilling confidence in children. Inderpal Singh also worked as an actor in Ads with Amir Khan in Atithi devo Bhav, Incredible India in this commercial ad a Sikh saves a tourist, and also with Divya Dutta in IPL6 ad. He also ideated for brands like Maruti Swift, Dainik Jagran, UTV, Escotel, etc. He conducted Creativity Trainings for brands like Pidilite and Pragya TV.

== Filmography ==
Year	Film	Role	Notes
2009	Bad Luck Govind	funny Punjabi 'Inderpal' Singh	People appreciate Inderpal Singh
2012	Vicky Donor	Taya ji	Performed a step "bulb utaro thalle rakkho"
2013	Besharam	as bhura paaji	A garage owner
2015	Mukhtiar Chadha	Mama Ji	with Diljit Dosanjh
TBA	3 Monkeys	Manjeet Saluja	

|Mamla legal hai season-2 |Judge sahab

== Personal life ==
Inderpal Singh originally belongs to Chandigarh Punjab and his family are still based there. His wife Mrs Japneet Kaur works as an Art Teacher with The Khaitan School, Noida and his father Mr Ranjit Singh, worked as Drilling Engineer with ONGC, while his mother late Mrs Harbans Kaur was a housewife. His daughter's name is Evleen Kaur. His elder brother Mr Amardeep Singh is a Civil Engineer by profession.
