= Sarah Barlondo =

French actress

- Born: Sète, France
- Citizenship: France, United Kingdom
- Education: Central Saint Martins; Architectural Association; Parsons; Lee Strasberg Theatre and Film Institute; Centro de Educación Artística; Cours Florent
- Occupation: Actress
- Years active: 2005-present
- Website: barlondo.com

Sarah Barlondo is a British-French actress and disability activist known for her role in Wonder Woman 1984 and her work the Mexican television series Un Refugio para el Amor produced by Televisa.

She also appeared on La Fuerza del Destino, Ni contigo ni sin ti, Esperanza del Corazón, La Guerre des Miss by Patrice Leconte

== Biography ==
Raised in the South of France, trained in Mexico City, Paris, and New York, Sarah is a professionally trained TV, film, and theater actress. Sarah honed her craft at the Cours Florent in Paris, Centro de Educación Artística in Mexico City, and the Lee Strasberg Theatre and Film Institute in New York, before appearing in French feature films La Guerre des Miss, and the Televisa Mexico series Un Refugio para el Amor, Ni Contigo, Ni Sin Ti, and La Fuerza del Destino. Outside of her acting and modeling work, Sarah is a forensic architect. She pursued her passion for architecture and humanitarian design, completing studies at Parsons in New York, and the Architectural Association and Central St Martins in London, graduating with honors and winning the Design for Peace award in 2018. Before her career as an actress, Sarah was a top-ranked ITF and WTA professional tennis player.

In 2018, obtained a role in the new Wonder Woman directed by Patty Jenkins and produced by Warner Bros. The feature film will be released in June 2020.

== Film ==
- La Guerre des Miss (2008) — Supporting role; directed by Patrice Leconte
- Wonder Woman 1984 (2020) — Played Max Lord’s mother; directed by Patty Jenkins
- Framed (2021) — Supporting role; directed by Nick Rizzini
- Crocodiles (2021) — Lead role; directed by Harry Law
- Accused: The Hampstead Paedophile Hoax (2024) — Lead role in Channel 4 / Netflix docudrama; directed by Emily Turner
- Detective Sherdil (2025) — Supporting lead role as Elizabeth Bhatti; directed by Ravi Chhabriya; Zee5 original

== Filmography ==
Year	Title	Role
2008	La Guerre des Miss	Miss 1995
2011	La Fuerza del Destino	Jenny
2011	Ni contigo ni sin ti	Sara
2011	Esperanza del Corazón	Constanza
2012	Un Refugio para el Amor	Aranza
2020	Wonder Woman 1984	Max Lord’s mother
2021	Framed	Cam
2021	Crocodiles	Lead
2024	Accused: The Hampstead Paedophile Hoax	Sara
2025	Detective Sherdil	Elizabeth Bhatii
