= My Dream =

My Dream may refer to:

- My Dream (album), an album by Yvette Michele
- "My Dream", a 1957 single by The Platters
- "My Dream" (Thea Garrett song), representing Malta, at the Eurovision Song Contest 2010
- "My Dream" (Thomas song), his winning song in the 2010 Danish series of X Factor
- "My Dream", a 2015 song by Sara Groves from the album Floodplain

== See also ==
- Mi Sueño (disambiguation)
