= Mi Sueño =

Mi Sueño may refer to:

== Music ==
- Mi Sueño (Marlon album). 2006
- Mi Sueño (Merche album), 2002
- Mi Sueño (Ibrahim Ferrer album) 2007
- Mi Sueño, 2010 album by Ana Isabelle
- "Mi Sueno", single by Vicente Fernández, written V. Fernández 1976
- "Mi Sueño", 2000 song by Luis Fonsi from the album Eterno
- "Mi Sueño", 2008 song by Franco De Vita from the album Simplemente La Verdad

== Other uses ==
- Mi Sueno (horse), winner of the 2009 Sorrento Stakes

== See also ==
- Sueño (disambiguation)
