= Detective Sherdil =

2025 Indian film by Ravi Chhabriya

- Official release poster
- Directed by: Ravi Chhabriya
- Written by: Ravi Chhabriya; Ali Abbas Zafar
- Screenplay by: Sagar Bajaj; Ali Abbas Zafar
- Produced by: Himanshu Kishan Mehra; Ali Abbas Zafar; Rohini Singh; Manmeet Singh
- Starring: Diljit Dosanjh; Diana Penty; Boman Irani; Ratna Pathak Shah; Chunky Panday; Banita Sandhu
- Cinematography: Marcin Laskawiec
- Edited by: Ravi Chhabriya
- Music by: Various Artists
- Production companies: Offside Entertainment; Maurya Entertainment; AAZ Films
- Distributed by: ZEE5
- Release date: 20 June 2025
- Running time: 106 minutes
- Country: India
- Language: Hindi

Detective Sherdil is a 2025 Indian Hindi-language mystery comedy film directed by Ravi Chhabriya, and produced by Himanshu Kishan Mehra, Ali Abbas Zafar, Rohini Singh, and Manmeet Singh under Offiside Entertainment, Maurya Entertainment, and AAZ Films. A ZEE5 original, the films features Diljit Dosanjh in the titular role, alongside Diana Penty, Boman Irani, Ratna Pathak Shah, Chunky Panday, and Banita Sandhu. The story follows Sherdil as he investigates the mysterious murder of an Indian-origin telecom tycoon in Budapest. The film was released on ZEE5 on 20 June 2025.

== Plot ==
In Budapest, wealthy Indian-origin businessman Pankaj Bhatti is found brutally murdered. What initially looks like a hate crime soon unravels into a complex conspiracy. Detective Sherdil, a witty and unorthodox investigator, joins forces with Natasha to solve the case. As the investigation unfolds, Sherdil encounters a host of eccentric suspects including Bodhi Mama, Shanti, and various members of the Bhatti family. Clues suggest hidden scams and long-held grudges. Sherdil's sharp mind and instinct ultimately expose the real culprit behind Bhatti's death.

== Cast ==
- Diljit Dosanjh as Detective Sherdil
- Diana Penty as Natasha
- Boman Irani as Pankaj Bhatti
- Ratna Pathak Shah as Rajeshwari Bhatti
- Chunky Panday as Bodhi Mama
- Banita Sandhu as Shanti Bhatti
- Sumeet Vyas as Angad Bhatti
- Kashmira Irani as Falak
- Mikhail Yawalkar as Danny
- Arjun Tanwar as Purvak
- Sarah Barlondo as Elizabeth
- Mukesh Bhatt as Jaipal

== Production ==
The film was directed and edited by Ravi Chhabriya and co-written by Ravi Chhabriya, Ali Abbas Zafar, and Sagar Bajaj. It was produced by Himanshu Kishan Mehra, Ali Abbas Zafar, Rohini Singh, and Manmeet Singh under Offside Entertainment, Maurya Entertainment, and AAZ Films. The entire film was shot in Budapest, Hungary.

== Reception ==
Rahul Desai of The Hollywood Reporter India said that "The pulpy detective drama wastes the screen presence and comic timing of Diljit Dosanjh". Shubhra Gupta of The Indian Express gave 1.5 stars out of five and described it as "There are enough adept actors in this ensemble, led by Diljit Dosanjh, for us to expect an engaging whodunit. But the treatment is flat, making the characters even flatter." Vineeta Kumar of India Today also rated 1.5/5 stars and said that "'Detective Sherdil' plays out like a long episode of 'Crime Patrol' - just less thrilling. While Sherdil tries his best to keep you invested, the film itself doesn't seem clever enough to make the entire journey worthwhile."

Shilajit Mitra of The Hindu described it as "Another ‘Knives Out’-like, this is a convoluted murder mystery with an unremarkable lead turn by Diljit Dosanjh." Ronak Kotecha of The Times of India gave 2.5 stars out of 5 and said that "‘Detective Sherdil’ tries to be a clever caper but ends up being just a colourful distraction. With a sharper script and smarter humour, it might’ve worked. But as it stands, this mystery is one you won't mind leaving unsolved." Vinamra Mathur of Firstpost writes in his review that "Unlike ‘Housefull 5 (A and B)’ and ‘36 China Town’, the final twist doesn't feel frivolous. It not only compliments the essence of the story but also exposes the fragility of dysfunctional relationships."

Amogh Ravindra of Deccan Herald said that Diljit Dosanjh plays the titular character, a quirky sleuth with charm and wit. While he brings his trademark likability, the character often slips into caricature, which takes some weight away from the mystery. Diana Penty’s role feels underwritten. Nandini Ramnath of Scroll.in writes that "Once the expectation of basic rigour is set aside – which is early on – the 106-minute move settles into a comedy in which grown-ups act like cartoon figures and Sherdil hops from one epiphany to the next. Diljit Dosanjh dominates the show without making it seem apparent." Yatamanyu Narain of News 18 observed that "Detective Sherdil is a slick murder mystery led by Diljit Dosanjh, mixing sharp humour, twists, and stunning visuals."

Devesh Sharma of Filmfare rated 2.5/5 stars and said that "Sherdil is a mishmash of themes. It's a murder mystery, comedy, moral drama and parody all rolled into one." Aishwarya Vasudevan of OTT Play also rated this film 2.5/5 stars and said that "Detective Sherdil banks on Diljit Dosanjh’s charm but delivers a predictable mystery with meme-style humour, stellar casting, and an underwhelming plot that lacks suspense and surprise." Shreyas Pande of Cinema Express gave 2 stars out of 5 and said that "the film wants to be slick and quirky but doesn’t go beyond surface-level embellishments".
