= Sueño =

Sueño, el sueño or sueños may refer to:

== Film ==
- Sueño (film), 2005 English-language American comedy

== Music ==
- "El Sueño" (song), by Diljit Dosanjh, 2017
- Sueños (music festival), annual American music festival in Chicago
- Sueños (Intocable album), 2002 Tejano album
- Sueños (Sech album), 2019 album
- Sueños (Yolandita Monge album), 1983 Latin pop album
- Sueño, a 1989 album by Eddie Palmieri
- "Sueño", a 1967 song by the Young Rascals from their album Groovin'
- Sueños, a 2003 album by Los Yonic's
- "Sueños", a 2001 song by Diego Torres from Un Mundo Diferente

== Other uses ==
- El sueño (La cama), a 1940 painting by Frida Kahlo

== See also ==
- Dream (disambiguation)
