= Vanilla, Pennsylvania =

Unincorporated community in Pennsylvania, U.S.

Coordinates: 39°46′41″N 77°51′02″W

Vanilla is an unincorporated community in Franklin County, in the U.S. state of Pennsylvania.

== History ==
A post office called Vanilla was in operation from 1902 until 1905.
