= Beauties at War =

- French: La guerre des miss
- Directed by: Patrice Leconte
- Written by: Fred Cavayé; Guillaume Lemans; Franck Chorot; Jean-Philippe Blime
- Produced by: Jean-Philippe Blime; Franck Chorot
- Starring: Benoît Poelvoorde; Olivia Bonamy
- Cinematography: Jean-Marie Dreujou
- Edited by: Joëlle Hache
- Music by: Étienne Perruchon
- Distributed by: Gaumont
- Release date: 14 November 2008 (Sarlat Film Festival)
- Running time: 89 minutes
- Country: France
- Language: French
- Budget: $11.2 million
- Box office: $1.7 million

Beauties at War is a 2008 French film. Originally titled La guerre des Miss in French, the film aired in France on 9 January 2009, directed by Patrice Leconte. It was also shown at the Seattle International Film Festival 2009.

== Plot ==
The villages of Charmoussey and Super-Charmoussey (Upper Charmoussey) have been longtime rivals despite the fact that many of their inhabitants are related to each other. While Charmoussey is relatively poor, Upper-Charmoussey enjoys the luxuries of a ski resort and thus a better economy than its sister village. The rivalry is also stressed because of the local beauty pageant, where the better trained and dressed girls of Upper-Charmoussey always win the contest. Since the size of both municipalities is very small, the local government has decided to merge Charmoussey into Upper-Charmoussey, this leaves the inhabitants of Charmoussey desperate because it is their last chance to win the beauty contest. In order to achieve that, they call the only person who has had any success outside the village, Franck (Benoît Poelvoorde) a second rate actor, who has been engaged mostly as an extra in many films (playing dead people) and is currently down on his luck after causing an accident that resulted in breaking the leg of actress Catherine Deneuve (his biggest role so far).

It is revealed that he left the village because he was regarded as strange and because his father was an eccentric scientist who died in trying a flying suit. He feels uneasy at coming back to his hometown but also recognizes that he cannot afford not to, so he uses his limited showbiz knowledge to train the local girls. Meanwhile, the inhabitants of Upper-Charmoussey have learned from the local postman that Franck has been engaged in training the contestants and start a counter espionage campaign of their own.

== Cast ==
- Benoît Poelvoorde: Franck Chevrel
- Olivia Bonamy: Cécile
- Jacques Mathou: The mayor of Charmoussey
- Christian Charmetant: The mayor of Super-Charmoussey
- Béatrice Michel: The mayor of Charmoussey's wife
- Michèle Garcia: The mayor of Super-Charmoussey's wife
- Cynthia Groggia: Camille
- Albert Delpy: The mayor of Super-Charmoussey's father
- Laurent Gamelon: Gaby
- Laurent Bateau: Jean-René Pouchard
- Jean-Paul Comart: The host
