= El Sueño (song) =

- Artwork of the song

Single by Diljit Dosanjh
- Language: Punjabi
- English title: The Dream
- Released: 19 October 2017 (video)
- Genre: World
- Length: 3:54
- Label: Famous Studios
- Songwriter: Lally Mundi

Music video
- "El Sueno feat. Tru-Skool" on YouTube

"El Sueño", meaning "The Dream" in Spanish, is a Punjabi single released by Diljit Dosanjh. Written by Lally Mundi, the song starts with a line in Spanish and features music by Tru-Skool. The music video for the song was shot in United Kingdom, and was directed by Kavar Singh. It was believed that the song would be later used in Diljit's upcoming movie based on First World War, but the movie "Sajjan Singh Rangroot" did not include it.

== Release ==
On 19 October 2017 the song's official video was released worldwide via Famous Studios YouTube channel. The song was released on 19 October 2017 at all major online music stores including iTunes. The video was directed by Kavar Singh and features Vanessa Calderon.
