= Back 2 Basics (Diljit Dosanjh album) =

Studio album by Diljit Dosanjh
- Released: 1 November 2012
- Genre: Punjabi, Bhangra
- Language: Punjabi
- Label: Moviebox Birmingham Limited

Diljit Dosanjh chronology
Sikh	Back 2 Basics	Sikh 2

Back 2 Basics is the eighth album by Diljit Dosanjh music by Tru Skool released worldwide on 1 November 2012. It is his eighth pop album and first in three years. His last pop album, The Next Level, was followed up with the religious album SIKH.

Back to Basics has nine tracks in which music is by Tru Skool and is under the label Speed Records. Dosanjh went on tour in 2012 in support of the album.

== Track listing ==
All music is composed by Tru Skool

Back 2 Basics
No.	Title	Length
1.	"Kharku"	3:37
2.	"Truck"	3:29
3.	"Strawberry"	3:51
4.	"Chunni"	5:18
5.	"Ranjha"	4:28
6.	"Band Bottle"	3:07
7.	"Radio"	4:04
8.	"iPhone"	3:40
Total length:		31:34

Bonus tracks composed by Tee-L
No.	Title	Length
9.	"Poh Di raat"	3:44
