= Mukhtiar Chadha =

- Theatrical release poster
- Directed by: Director Gifty
- Written by: Director Gifty; Diljit Dosanjh
- Produced by: Vivek Ohri
- Starring: Diljit Dosanjh; Oshin Sai; Yashpal Sharma; Inderpal Singh; Kiran Juneja; Vikash Kumar; Jaswant Rathore
- Music by: JSL Singh
- Production companies: Ohri Productions Pvt. Ltd.; Wahid Sandhar Showbiz
- Distributed by: Eros International
- Release date: 27 November 2015
- Running time: 120 minutes
- Country: India
- Language: Punjabi
- Box office: ₹8.16 crore (US$850,000)

Mukhtiar Chadha is a Punjabi romantic comedy film starring Diljit Dosanjh and Oshin Brar. The film was directed and written by Director Gifty while it was produced by Ohri Productions & Wahid Sandhar Showbiz and by presentation of Eros International. The other roles are done by Yashpal Sharma, Kiran Juneja, Vikash Kumar, Jaswant Rathore and Rajasthani comedian Khayali. Dialogues of the film were written by Raman k Jangwal & Manoj Sabberwal.

== Cast ==
- Diljit Dosanjh as Mukhtiar Chadha
- Oshin Brar as Dimple
- Yashpal Sharma as Chidi Hussain
- Kiran Juneja as Mukhtiar's Mother
- Inderpal Singh as Mukhtiar's maternal uncle
- Vikash Kumar as Scientist
- Khayali Saharan as Balingdi

== Plot ==
Mukhtiar Chadha (Diljit Dosanjh) is a Delhi-based jack of all trades, without a stable source of income. He lives with his widowed mother (Kiran Juneja), and does a variety of professions including being a property dealer, and sometimes being a con-artist. He is also an avid investor in stocks. Mukhtiar also falls in love with his neighbor (Oshin Brar), though the girl's father does not approve of him.

Trouble arises for Mukhtiar, when he brokers a land deal, but the buyers (Yashpal Sharma and Khayali Ram) illegally grab his client's land by only making a part payment to his client. Mukhtiar fights those goons and manages to defeat them.

== Planning and Shooting ==
Director Gifty (Chetan Parwana) and Diljit Dosanjh decided about movie while working on music track called Kharku. Yashpal Sharma claimed he was the funniest villain ever to be seen in Punjabi cinema and termed the film as hardcore comedy. Oshin Brar was also part of music video Kharku when she was offered this film. She had to walk barefoot on desert sand while shooting the movie song Main Deewani at Jaisalmer thus burning her feet and in conditions of 55 degree Celsius temperatures she was dehydrated.

During the filming of the song 'Main Deewani,' the cast and crew faced significant challenges due to the extreme heat in Jaisalmer. Despite the harsh conditions, including temperatures reaching 55 degrees Celsius, the team managed to complete the shoot, showcasing their dedication and resilience.

== Promotions ==
During Promotions Diljit revealed his character Mukhtiar Singh Chadha is seen with a typical Delhi Sikh trader accent, for which he took diction classes in Old Delhi. Oshin Brar also visited an education institute in Hisar for the promotions. For promotions of Dilwale and Mukhtiar Chadha together on an entertainment channel, Diljit also interviewed Shah Rukh Khan where SRK pulled off a mimicry of Chadhaji's character successfully to Diljit in Chaddaji's language saying famous dialogue assisted by Kriti Sanon alongside Dilwale team, Varun Dhawan and Rohit Shetty for Dubsmash video.

== Songs ==
Mukhtiar Chadha has music from JSL Singh and lyrics by rapper Ikka Singh.

=== Track listing ===
- "Shoon Shaan" - Diljit Dosanjh
- "Main Deewani" - Nooran Sisters
- "Click Click" - Diljit Dosanjh
- "Gapuchi Gapuchi Gum Gum" - Diljit Dosanjh
- "Gun Vargi Bolian Pave" - Diljit Dosanjh
- "Kol Kinare" - Diljit Dosanjh

== Release ==
The film was released on 27 November 2015. Trailer of film was released on 22 October 2015 and was regarded as very funny.

== Reception ==
=== Box office ===
Mukhtiar Chadha was released in 85 cinema halls in the five key international markets on 27 November such as Canada, UK, US, Australia, and New Zealand. It did decent business collecting ₹2.31 crore (US$240,000) at the overseas box office in 10 days.

=== Critical response ===
CNN-IBN in their movie review by Divya Pal and live Twitter review appreciated the movie and actor Diljit Dosanjh. Hindustan Times reviewed the movie as a good watch and stated Diljit Dosanjh's comic timing makes it a fun film with a laughter guarantee for a good part of it. Jasmine Singh of The Tribune wrote that Diljit has definitely showed yet again that he is a spontaneous actor who can act without a storyline and also the film has a lot of fun-filled moments. Punjabi channels like ABP Sanjha and Hamdard TV gave very positive reviews to the film.
