= Tru Skool =

- Also known as: Tru Skool
- Born: Sukhjit Singh OLK
- Origin: Derby, Midlands, UK
- Genres: Bhangra; hip-hop
- Occupations: Record producer; musician; music director
- Instruments: Dhol; dholak; tabla; tumbi; harmonium; drums; keyboard; guitars; algozey; bugchu
- Years active: 2004–present
- Labels: VIP Music UK; Check One Recordz; Moviebox Records UK; Speed Records; T Series

Tru Skool (born Sukhjit Singh OLK) is a Derby, Midlands, UK-based Punjabi bhangra and hip hop record producer. Two albums he produced, Back to Basics by Diljit Dosanjh and Bacthafucup by Karan Aujla, charted on the Billboard Canadian Albums chart. He has also been awarded multiple Brit Asia TV Music Awards.

He is known for using a variety of Punjabi folk instruments along with traditional hip-hop beats. He usually plays all instruments such as dhol, tabla, harmonium, and drums in his songs by himself.

== Career ==
In 2004, Tru-Skool started his career with the Word Is Born which was collaborated with Mandeep Singh Marwah known as The Specialist. After this, he produced his second album Repazent again with The Specialist. He worked with Diljit Dosanjh for Back 2 Basics (2012). Later he worked with JK, Kulvinder Singh Johal and many more.

In 2013 he was awarded for Best Asian Music Producer at the Brit Asia TV Music Awards. In 2017, he was awarded both Best Album for One Time 4 Ya Mind and Best Music Producer.

In 2021, Karan Aujla's debut album, Bacthafucup, produced by him, appeared at number 19 on the Billboard Canadian Albums chart.

== Solo discography ==
Release	Album	Artist	Record label
2009	In Tha House (with Kaos Productions)	Various	Vip Records/Universal Music
2007	Raw As Folk	Various	Bazaar Records/Speed Records
2006	Repazent (with The Specialist)	Various	Vip Records/T-Series
2004	Word Is Born (with The Specialist)	Various	EasyLife Records/Vip Records/Music Waves

== Religious discography ==
Release	Album	Artist	Record label
2012	Beant Satwant Da Badla	Pavitar Singh Pasla	Immortal Productions
2009	Tera Anth (From Album Chaurasi 84)	Pavitar Singh Pasla (With The Specialist)	Immortal Productions

== Discography as a producer ==
Release	Album	Artist	Record label
2026	The Call of Panjab	Diljit Dosanjh	Famous Studios
2021	BacThaFucUp	Karan Aujla	Speed Records/Times Music
2016	One Time 4 Ya Mind	Ashok Prince	Moviebox UK
2014	Once Upon Tha Mic (1 Song: Gidheyan Di Rani)	Kulvinder Johal	MovieBox
2012	Back To Basics	Diljit Dosanjh	Speed Records/Moviebox UK
2012	Panjabi Touch (1 Song: Chak Dhen Geh)	Gurbhej Brar	VIP Records
2011	Gabru Panjab Dha	JK	Vip Records UK/Indya Records
2010	Mundeh Panjabi / The Folk Star Of Punjab	Kulvinder Singh Johal	Vip Records UK/Indya Records

== Film projects ==
Release	Film	Starring	Singer	Music
2022	Jodi	Diljit Dosanjh, Nimrat Khaira	Diljit Dosanjh and many more.	Tru Skool
2013	Jatt Boys Putt Jattan De	Jazzy B, Garry Sandhu	Surinder Shinda, JK, Gurbhej Brar, Kulvinder Johal	Tru Skool, Dr Zeus, Laddi Gill

== Single tracks ==
Release	Title	Singer	Music	Label
2023	82	JK	Tru Skool	Check One Recordz
2022	Jatti Di Torh	JK ft. Munraj	Tru Skool	Check One Recordz
2021	On The Mic	JK	Tru Skool	Juqebox Records
2020	Set It Off	Prince	Tru Skool	Checkone Recordz
2019	Sanu Nasha	Dav Singh	Tru Skool	VIP Music
2019	Bhabieh	JK	Tru Skool	VIP Music
2018	Shindeh Di Tape	JK	Tru Skool	VIP Music
2018	Jatt Da Flag	Jazzy B	Tru Skool	T Series
2017	Pomp Pomp tha Music	JK	Tru Skool	VIP Music
2017	El-Sueño	Diljit Dosanjh	Tru Skool	Famous Studios
2016	Baaghi Tera Yaar	JK	Tru Skool	VIP Music
2015	Putt Sardaran De	Gurj Sidhu	Tru Skool	MovieBox UK
2014	Pauna Bhangra (With Kaos Productions)	Baljit Malwa	Tru Skool	Moviebox UK
2013	Kharrak	Jaswant Heera	Tru Skool	VIP Music
2011	Chak Dhen Geh	Gurbhej Brar	Tru Skool	VIP Music
