= Jodi (2023 film) =

- Trailer poster
- Directed by: Amberdeep Singh
- Written by: Amberdeep Singh
- Produced by: Karaj Gill; Daljit Thind
- Starring: Diljit Dosanjh; Nimrat Khaira
- Cinematography: Sandeep Patil
- Edited by: Manish More
- Music by: Tru Skool
- Production companies: Rhythm Boyz Entertainment; Thind Motion Films
- Distributed by: Rhythm Boyz
- Release date: 5 May 2023
- Running time: 139 minutes
- Country: India
- Language: Punjabi

Jodi (pronounced [d͡ʒoːɽiː]) is an Indian Punjabi-language romantic-comedy period film written and directed by Amberdeep Singh. It is co-produced by Karaj Gill under Rhythm Boyz Entertainment and Daljit Thind under Thind Motion Films. The film stars Dosanjh and Nimrat Khaira.

Dosanjh started working on music of the film in August 2019, and its filming began on 5 October 2019. The film was scheduled to be released on 26 June 2020 but it was postponed due to the COVID-19 pandemic. The film was scheduled for release on 24 June 2021, but was postponed again due to COVID-19. It was finally released on 5 May 2023.

== Cast ==
- Diljit Dosanjh as Amar Singh Sitaara
- Nimrat Khaira as Kamaljot
- Hardeep Gill as Ustaad
- Harsimran as Joshila
- Drishtii Garewal as Neelam Komal
- Ravinder Mand as Bhola

== Production ==
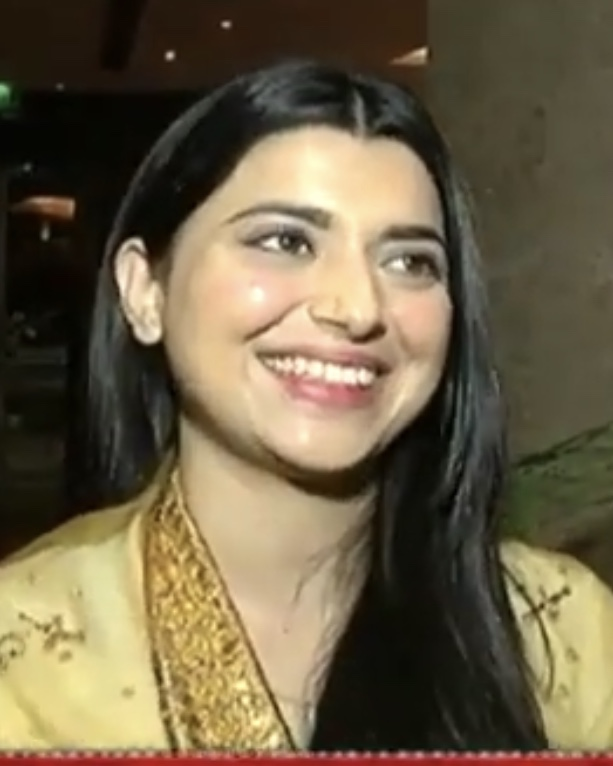
Jodi is Nimrat Khaira's (pictured 2020) second collaboration with Amberdeep Singh and Rhythm Boyz, after Lahoriye.

=== Development ===
Amberdeep Singh started working on Jodi in 2011, and was announced by him in December 2018. Singh and Gurpreet Singh Palheri developed the film and joined Rhythm Boyz Entertainment to produce. Karaj Gill in an interview disclosed that the film was discussed every time before their another films. On 30 January 2019, Diljit Dosanjh was confirmed as a lead actor. Dosanjh started working on music of the film in August 2019. Also, he disclosed that Amrinder Gill is a producer, but he would not be seen on the screen for this film.

=== Filming ===
Principal photography of the film was scheduled to begin in September–October, and finally began on 5 October 2019, where Sandeep Patil served as cinematographer. First schedule of the filming was completed on 29 November 2019. Nimrat Khaira was confirmed as a lead actress. Drishti Grewal was also confirmed as the part of the film.

== Soundtrack ==
The soundtrack of the film contains 15 songs composed and produced by Tru Skool, with a bonus single produced by Gurmeet Singh. The lyrics are penned by Happy Raikoti, Raj Ranjodh, Veet Baljit, Harmanjeet and many more. The music is of the Panjabi folk genre, featuring genre specific instrumentation all recorded live in Derby, England. Musical pieces also composed and directed by Tru Skool.

Tracklisting (order of release, complete tracklisting yet TBA)
No.	Title	Lyrics	Music	Singer(s)	Length
1.	"Jigra Te Laija Gabrua"	Raj Ranjodh	Tru Skool	Diljit Dosanjh, Nimrat Khaira	2:54
2.	"Takue Chalaon Ni Main Janda"	Happy Raikoti	Tru Skool	Diljit Dosanjh, Nimrat Khaira	4:32
3.	"Jodi Teri Meri"	Raj Ranjodh	Tru Skool	Diljit Dosanjh, Nimrat Khaira	4:15
4.	"Chan Wargi"	Happy Raikoti	Tru Skool	Diljit Dosanjh, Nimrat Khaira	3:36
5.	"Meri Kalam Na bole"	Happy Raikoti	Tru Skool	Diljit Dosanjh	3:28
6.	"Lagge Magh Di Trail Wargi"	Happy Raikoti	Tru Skool	Raj Ranjodh, Nimrat Khaira	4:44
7.	"Jatt Di Jaan"	Raj Ranjodh	Tru Skool	Diljit Dosanjh, Nimrat Khaira	2:53
8.	"Jinde"	Harmanjeet	Gurmeet Singh	Amrinder Gill	3:20
9.	"Akhiri Salaam"	Raj Ranjodh	Tru Skool	Diljit Dosanjh	4:05
10.	"Gal Kise Di"	Veet Baljit	Tru Skool	Diljit Dosanjh	2:53
11.	"Parohna Banke"	Raj Ranjodh	Tru Skool	Diljit Dosanjh, Nimrat Khaira	TBA
12.	"Lalkaare Jatt De"	Raj Ranjodh	Tru Skool	Diljit Dosanjh, Nimrat Khaira	4:05
13.	"Jatt Jaati Saati"	Raj Ranjodh	Tru Skool	Diljit Dosanjh, Nimrat Khaira	4:05
Total length:					TBA

== Release and marketing ==
Jodi was announced by Amberdeep Singh in December 2018 on his social media handle, following the release of Bhajjo Veero Ve. In January 2019, the title poster of the film was released revealing Diljit Dosanjh as a lead actor and producer along with Amrinder Gill and Karaj Gill. Also, the poster was released along a caption "Punjabi Cinema Zindabaad" which means "Long Live Punjabi Cinema". The film was initially scheduled to be released in 2019 but was postponed to 26 June 2020. It was again postponed due to the COVID-19 pandemic.

It was finally released on 5 May 2023. Four days before the film's release, a local court in Ludhiana stayed its release after a person named Ishdeep Randhawa filed a motion claiming that Chamkila's first wife Gurmail Kaur had sold the exclusive rights to make Chamkila's biopic to his father Gurdev Singh, who died in November 2022. Randhawa further alleged that Gurmail Kaur had collected ₹ 5 lakh from his father in exchange for the rights and signed a written agreement, after which the court postponed the film's release and all the morning shows scheduled for 5 May were cancelled. However, it was released in the evening after the distributor sent a letter to the theatres and multiplexes claiming that the situation had been resolved and both parties had reached an agreement.
