= Ambarsariya =

- Directed by: Mandeep Kumar
- Written by: Dheeraj Rattan
- Screenplay by: Dheeraj Rattan
- Produced by: Tips Industries
- Starring: Diljit Dosanjh; Navneet Kaur Dhillon; Monica Gill; Lauren Gottlieb; Gul Panag; Gurpreet Ghuggi; Binnu Dhillon
- Cinematography: Anshul Chobey
- Edited by: Manish More
- Music by: Jatinder Shah
- Production company: Tips Industries
- Distributed by: Tips Industries; White Hill Studios
- Release date: 25 March 2016
- Running time: 139 minutes
- Country: India
- Language: Punjabi
- Box office: est. ₹24.88 crore (US$2.6 million)

Ambarsariya is an Indian Punjabi comedy thriller film directed by Mandeep Kumar, written by Dheeraj Rattan and starring Diljit Dosanjh, Monica Gill, Navneet Kaur Dhillon, and Lauren Gottlieb as the main cast. It was released worldwide on 25 March 2016. The movie was remade in Odia in 2018 as Prem Kumar: Salesman of the Year.

== Plot ==
Jatt Ambarsariya (Diljit Dosanjh) lives a dual life as a RAW agent and insurance agent. He is put on a mission to save the honest and idealistic Home Minister of Punjab from a drug mafia who is plotting the minister's murder.

During the course of the mission, Jatt Ambarsariya meets Jasleen Kaur (Navneet Kaur Dhillon), his boss at the insurance company. His boss falls for him. Then there is Kirat (Monica Gill), his landlord who is smitten by his charm and calmness. In accomplishing his mission, he falls in love with both of them and the same goes for them, resulting in a love triangle.

We flash forward to present time where Jatt is at a Dhaba and he is talking to some bystanders. One of them asks what happened with the girls he loved? Jatt stated that after the conclusion of his mission, he vowed to remain true to his job so he broke their hearts. The bystanders in shock walk away in disgust. We see Jatt hop on his motorcycle riding away in the night.

== Cast ==
- Diljit Dosanjh as Jatt Ambarsariya alias Diljit Singh, an Insurance Agent/RAW agent
- Navneet Kaur Dhillon as Jasleen Kaur, Insurance office boss
- Monica Gill as Kirat, Landlord's Daughter
- Lauren Gottlieb as Manpreet, a photographer
- Gul Panag as Geet Sandhu, Officer RAW Intelligence Department
- Gurpreet Ghuggi as Manpreet, a Doctor (Hakim)
- Rana Ranbir as Manpreet, a Bhangra Teacher
- Karamjit Anmol as Dhabha Owner
- Binnu Dhillon as Punjab Police
- Ravinder Mand as Dhaba Employee
- Raghveer Boli as Punjab Police Constable
- Shavinder Mahal as Punjab Home Minister
- Rana Jung Bahadur as Jatt Ambarsariya's Landlord
- Seema Kaushal as Landlord's wife

== Production ==
Ambarsariya is second film of Diljit Dosanjh with director Mandeep Kumar after film Jihne Mera Dil Luteya (also with same producer, Kumar Taurani of Tips). Diljit Dosanjh turned tutor for Lauren Gottlieb and taught her the punjabi language on set. Femina Miss India 2013 winner Navneet Kaur Dhillon revealed that working with Diljit Dosanjh is dream come true for her. The film is shot at different locations in the holy city, Amritsar. Diljit also revealed that the holy city of Amritsar is one of his favourite destinations for movie shooting. Singh Saab the Great actress Urvashi Rautela was first cast in a lead role for the film but she was not able to, due to date issues.

== Track list ==
S.No	Track	Singer	Lyrics	Music	Duration
1.	"Pagg Wala Munda"	Diljit Dosanjh	Happy Raikoti	Jatinder Shah	3:03
2.	"Ju Think"	Diljit Dosanjh	Deep Arraicha	Jatinder Shah	2:46

== Release and marketing ==
Ambarsariya was released in many new countries like France, Austria alongside the key international markets on 25 March 2016 like India, Pakistan, Canada, UK, US, Australia, and New Zealand. Ambarsariya was also second film of Diljit Dosanjh after his Jatt & Juliet 2 to be released in various theatres across Pakistani Punjab but was banned by Pakistan's Central Board of Film Certification (CBFC) alongside Punjab Board of Film Certification (PBFC) and Sindh Board of Film Certification (SBFC) due to direct references to Indian intelligence agency RAW in the film.

=== Marketing ===
During Ambarsariya's promotions in New Delhi, Diljit dedicated a song for Alia Bhatt's 23rd birthday (also his co-star in Udta Punjab). The cast of the film also appeared on Krishna Abhishek's show Comedy Nights Live to promote their film. Singer Mika Singh support the Diljit. Lauren Gottlieb revealed her role as an Indo-Canadian Punjabi girl and also praised Punjab liking Punjabi culture, food, colours, clothes as well as Diljit as a rockstar, Singer, actor, dancer. During the promotions, Diljit recalled to Mumbai Mirror about his meeting with Anushka Sharma's co-producer brother, Karnesh and writer-director Anshai Lal for Bollywood film Phillauri in December 2015 admitting that Rab Ne Bana Di Jodi as his favourite Anushka film. Diljit also visited office of Box Office India with Mandeep Kumar for an interview. Diljit Dosanjh also translated some iconic Hindi dialogues into Punjabi during a visit to The Times of India's Noida office. There, he also revealed that during his visit to YouTube headquarters in US, they told him that Delhi searches him the most on YouTube so he is very thankful to the people of Delhi. Diljit told CNN-IBN that they have talked about Sardar Udham Singh (Tiger of Punjab) in the film alongside dealing with some issues that have been ailing Punjab thus film comes with several important lessons. Diljit stated his dream role that he would love to play a pirate similar to Johnny Depp did in the blockbuster Pirates of the Caribbean series.

== Reception ==
=== Box office ===
Ambarsariya grossed ₹3.10 crore (US$320,000) on its first day Box office earnings excluding US, Canada and few other markets. Movie however failed to beat the opening weekend business record of Sardaar Ji as movie was released in over 114 screens and collected approximately ₹5.40 crore (US$560,000) at the overseas box office in the first weekend. It also beat John Abraham's Rocky Handsome in all international markets except in US. Ambarsariya minted ₹6.2 crore (US$640,000) from India and in the international markets it shattered the records of Airlift as it minted ₹1.24 crore (US$130,000) from the US box office, ₹1.51 crore (US$160,000) from Canada box office, ₹93.8 lakh (US$97,000) from the UK-Ireland box office, ₹1.26 crore (US$130,000) from Australia and ₹44.15 lakh (US$46,000) from New Zealand. Film was blockbuster hit with a box office collection of ₹7 crore (US$730,000) from four-day run in India. The film Crossed ₹12 crore (US$1.2 million) in 10 Days.

=== Critical response ===
Subhash K. Jha in his review appreciated the film. Amann Khuranaa of The Times of India praised the film's script, describing it as "beautifully penned" and noting that it had "done justice to every character." Khuranaa also praised Dosanjh's comic timing, a sentiment shared by Jasmine Singh of The Tribune who wrote, "The actor is like nitrous oxide that spreads a wave of laughter by just saying a word or even maintaining a poker face." Khuranaa also praised the film's direction, as did Singh, who wrote, "The director needs a pat for handling so many characters, pretty much in a balanced way." Divya Pal of CNN-IBN described the film as "unpredictable and enjoyable."
