= Protecting Internet Freedom Act =

The Protecting Internet Freedom Act (S. 3034) is a bill introduced in June 2016 by United States Senator Ted Cruz to "prohibit the National Telecommunications and Information Administration from allowing the Internet Assigned Numbers Authority functions contract to lapse unless specifically authorized to do so by an Act of Congress."

Considering that "past proceedings of one Congress do not bind its successor, business remaining at the end of one Congress does not carry over to the beginning of a new Congress (with the exception of impeachment)" the bill effectively died with the ending of the 114th United States Congress.

== Background ==
United States government oversight of the Internet Corporation for Assigned Names and Numbers (ICANN) by the National Telecommunications and Information Administration (NTIA) was scheduled to end in October 2016. A prior agreement had ensured that the United States government must be consulted on any "modifications, additions, or deletions" to the root zone file which is maintained under subcontract by ICANN.

On June 9, 2016, NTIA announced ICANN's plan for replacing its oversight with a "multi-stakeholder model". The California non-profit has a board of 20 members and an advisory committee made up of representatives of 171 countries. In order to make a recommendation to the board, all countries must agree unanimously. The board can then reject their recommendations.

The goal of the Protecting Internet Freedom Act is to disallow the transition to the multi-stakeholder model in favor of continued US government oversight. However, the NTIA argued that the opposite is true, and preventing privatization would in fact lead to "the United Nations...or another intergovernmental organization to take over stewardship of the DNS."
