= Punjabi International Film Academy Awards =

Punjabi International Film Academy Awards also known as PIFAA Awards are presented to honour both artistic and technical excellence of professionals Punjabi Film Industry. The first ever awards function was held in Toronto, Canada in August 2012. The awards were organized by Parvasi Media Inc. and Canadian Government. The PIFA Awards consist of 15 categories and recognizes Punjabi films from across the world. Punjabi films from Pakistan are also included in a special category.

== History ==
The awards were vision of Rajinder Saini, President of the Parvasi Entertainment, whose dream was to create high quality awards for Punjabi Cinema just like Bollywood awards functions. Dharmendra was the Brand Ambassador for the 2012 PIFA Awards.

== Awards Ceremonies ==
The following is a listing of all Punjabi International Film Academy Awards ceremonies since 2012

Ceremony	Date	Host(s)	Venue	City
1st PIFAA Awards	4 August 2012	Kapil Sharma, Sonu Sood, Gurpreet Ghuggi & Divya Dutta	Air Canada Centre	(Canada) Toronto

== Awards ==
Popular Awards

- Best Film - Jury
- Best Film - Public Choice
- Best Director
- Best Actor - Male
- Best Actor - Female
- Best Supporting Actor - Male
- Best Supporting Actor - Female
- Best Performance in Negative Role
- Best Performance in Comic Role
- Best Music Director
- Best Lyricist
- Best Story Rajan Gangahar
- Best Playback Singer - Male
- Best Playback Singer - Female
- Best Cinematography
- Best Editor
- Best Dialogue
- Best Screenplay
- Lifetime Achievement Awards
