= The Lion of Punjab (film) =

2011 film directed by Guddu Dhanoa

Lion of Punjab
- Theatrical release poster
- Directed by: Guddu Dhanoa
- Written by: Santosh Dhanoa
- Screenplay by: Sanyanshu Gupta
- Produced by: Balvir Tanda; Shikha Tanda; Yo Yo Honey Singh
- Starring: Diljit Dosanjh; Jividha Sharma; Pooja Tandon; Gurpreet Ghuggi
- Cinematography: Raju Kay Gee
- Edited by: Umesh Rane
- Music by: Songs: Anand Raj Anand; Score: Surinder Sodhi
- Production company: Tanda Films Norway
- Distributed by: Kumar Films
- Release date: 11 February 2011 (India)
- Running time: 155 minutes
- Country: India
- Language: Punjabi

Lion of Punjab is an Indian Punjabi action film starring Diljit Dosanjh, making his debut as a lead actor. It is also the debut Punjabi film of director Guddu Dhanoa. It is a remake of 2003 Tamil film Dhool.

The film was released on 11 February 2011. with a music release on 31 January 2011.

The plot revolves around the lead character, Avtar Singh, who leads a fight against a powerful politician. The battle is as a result of the politicians factory polluting the water of a local village, which leads to a rise in cancer cases for the inhabitants of the village.

== Cast ==
- Diljit Dosanjh as Avtar Singh
- Jividha Sharma as Jassi
- Pooja Tandon as Amrit
- Gurpreet Ghuggi as Amrit's Brother
- Deep Dhillon as Politician Balwant Rai
- Vivek Shauq as Balwant Rai's P.A.
- Vindu Dara Singh as Inspector Balbir Singh
- Bhotu Shah as Tiwari
- Yaad Grewal as Babbar
- Rupinder Kaur
- Malkit Meet
- Sukhmeet Sidhu as police inspector
- Parandeep Kainth

== Music ==
The Lion of Punjab

Soundtrack album by Diljit Dosanjh, Various Artists
- Released: 31 January 2011
- Genres: Punjabi, Bhangra
- Label: Speed Records

The album was released on Speed Records in India and digitally around the world by Music Waves.

The lead track on the soundtrack is "Lak Twenty Eight Kudi Da", a collaboration with producer Honey Singh, although the track itself does not feature in the film.

In the UK, "Lak 28 Kudi Da" (as it was re-titled for that market) reached the number-one position on the official Asian Download Chart on 30 April 2011. The track was released by Kamlee Records in the UK despite the soundtrack not being picked up for a physical release in that territory.

=== Track listing ===
| Track | Song | Singers | Lyrics |
|---|---|---|---|
| 1 | "Lak Twenty Eight Kudi Da" | Diljit Dosanjh feat. Honey Singh | Bachan Bedil , Alfaaz , Honey Singh |
| 2 | "Karreena Saif Tattoo" | Anand Raj Anand feat. Ritu Pathak | Anand Raj Anand |
| 3 | "Lions of Punjab" | Diljit Dosanjh | Anand Raj Anand |
| 4 | "Ishaq Tilasmi Jaadu" | Diljit Dosanjh feat. Ritu Pathak | Anand Raj Anand |
| 5 | "Wow Wow" | Diljit Dosanjh feat. Ritu Pathak | Anand Raj Anand |
| 6 | "Gore Gore" | Diljit Dosanjh feat. Shaintnee | Anand Raj Anand |
| 7 | "Sachhe Paatshah" | Anand Raj Anand | Anand Raj Anand |
| 8 | "Lions of Punjab" | Anand Raj Anand | Anand Raj Anand |
| 9 | "Aj Tenu Nachna Di" | Diljit Dosanjh, Sukshinder Shinda | Anand Raj Anand |
