= The Next Level =

Studio album by Diljit Dosanjh
- Released: 20 August 2009
- Genre: Pop, Pop rap, Bhangra, Punjabi
- Length: 28:57
- Language: Punjabi
- Producer: Yo Yo Honey Singh

Diljit Dosanjh chronology
Chocolate (2008)	The Next Level (2009)	Sikh (2012)

Singles from The Next Level
- 1. "Dil Nachda"; 2. "Panga"; 3. "Desi Daaru"; 4. "Los Angeles LA"

The Next Level is the sixth studio album by singer Diljit Dosanjh, released on 20 August 2009 worldwide by T-Series, making it one of his most successful albums. It was also released internationally to US, Canada, and UK.

The album was composed and produced by Honey Singh, and contained eight tracks.

== Background ==
"Dil Nach Da", the lead single of the album, was written by Balvir Boparai, while four other songs were written by Pirti Silon. The title of the album was coined by Singh after he asked Diljit whether "he wants to do whatever is being done or something next level", to which Diljit replied "next level".

== Release ==
The album was preceded by the lead single, "Dil Nach Da" which impacted worldwide. Following the success of his first single, "Panga" was released, featuring Honey Singh, which was another success. The duo also appeared on the track "Los Angeles (LA)" which also featured Singh. The album received positive reviews.

== Track listing ==
All music is composed by Honey Singh.

The Next Level
No.	Title	Lyrics	Length
1.	"Dil Nach Da"	Balvir Boparai	3:51
2.	"Panga ft. Yo Yo Honey Singh"	Pirti Silon, Honey Singh	4:39
3.	"Desi Daroo"	Pirti Silon	3:04
4.	"Los Angeles (LA) ft. Yo Yo Honey Singh"	Pirti Silon	3:37
5.	"Punjab"	Sata Kotliwala	3:20
6.	"Kabaddi"	Sata Kotliwala	3:47
7.	"Ru Ba Ru"	Honey Singh	2:56
8.	"Talwaran"	Pirti Silon	3:42
Total length:			28:57
