= Jihne Mera Dil Luteya =

2011 Punjabi-language romantic comedy

- Official film poster
- Directed by: Mandeep Kumar
- Written by: Dheeraj Rattan
- Produced by: Batra Showbiz Pvt. Ltd.
- Starring: Gippy Grewal; Diljit Dosanjh; Neeru Bajwa; Binnu Dhillon
- Music by: Aman Hayer; Honey Singh; Jatinder Singh Shah; Bhinda Aujla
- Distributed by: Tips Films / Speed Records
- Release date: 29 July 2011
- Country: India
- Language: Punjabi

Jihne Mera Dil Luteya (transl. The one who stole my heart) is a 2011 Indian Punjabi language romantic comedy film directed by Mandeep Kumar with story and screenplay by Dheeraj Rattan, produced by Batra Showbiz Pvt. Ltd. and starring Gippy Grewal, Diljit Dosanjh, Neeru Bajwa, and Binnu Dhillon.

== Plot ==
Life is carefree and filled with series of mischievous events for dashing and happy-go-lucky Yuvraj and the handsome rocking rebel Gurnoor at Punjabi University, Patiala. Both are neighbours whose families do not get along with one another. They are then are bedazzled by the charming and sexy Noor, whose dad is very wealthy, and has recently returned from abroad. Both Yuvraj and Gurnoor's dads tell the boys to make her fall in love with them. After a while Noor's dad goes bankrupt. Both Yuvraj and Gurnoor's dads tell them not to go after her and focus on their education. But both have fallen for Noor who has swept them off their feet the moment she landed in their lives. The comedy unfolds and Noor tells Gurnoor she loves Yuvraj. Yuvraj then marries Noor with the help of Gurnoor.

== Cast ==
- Gippy Grewal as Yuvraaj Randhawa
- Diljit Dosanjh as Gurnoor Randhawa
- Neeru Bajwa as Noor Bajwa
- Binnu Dhillon as Karanveer
- B.N. Sharma as P.K. Palta
- Karamjit Anmol as Karma
- Jaswinder Bhalla as Professor Bhalla
- Rana Jung Bahadur as Advocate Shingara
- Tej Sapru as Pritpal Randhawa, Gurnoor’s Father
- Sardar Sohi as Shamsher Randhawa, Yuvraaj‘s Father
- Sunita Dhir as Mrs. Randhawa, Yuvraaj‘s Mother
- Shivender Mahal as Mr. Bajwa, Noor‘s Father

== Reception ==
Jihne Mera Dil Luteya saw the biggest opening day, weekend and week ever for a Punjabi movie at the time of release. It had an opening week of Rs 26.5 million in Punjab.

== PTC Punjabi Film Awards 2012 ==
Jihne Mera Dil Luteya won eight awards at the 2nd PTC Punjabi Film Awards in 2012.

Category	Winner's Name
Best Actor	Gippy Grewal
Best Editing	Manish More
Best Screenplay & Dialogues	Dheeraj Rattan
Best Performance In a Comic Role	B.N. Sharma
Best Actress	Neeru Bajwa
Best Film	Batra Showbiz Pvt. Ltd
Best Actor	Diljit Dosanjh
Best Director	Mandeep Kumar

== Soundtrack ==
Jihne Mera Dil Luteya

Soundtrack album
- Genre: Feature film soundtrack
- Label: Tips

=== Track list ===
Track	Song	Artist(s)	Composer	Writer
01	"Munde Jattan De"	Gippy Grewal	Aman Hayer	Veet Baljit
02	"Channa"	Gippy Grewal	Jatinder Singh Shah	Raj Kakra
03	"Fukre"	Diljit Dosanjh	Honey Singh	Pirti Silon
04	"Jitthe Ho Jiye Khadde"	Gippy Grewal, Diljit Dosanjh	Bhinda Aujla	Kala Nizampuri
05	"Jhanjhar"	Gippy Grewal, Diljit Dosanjh, Gurlez Akhtar	Bhinda Aujla	Karamjeet Kado
06	"Supna"	Diljit Dosanjh	Honey Singh	Alfaaz
07	"Billi Billi Akkh Waliye"	Gippy Grewal	Aman Hayer	Jitt Salala
08	"Aakadd Dikhawe"	Diljit Dosanjh	Bhinda Aujla	Pirti Silon
09	"Bina Galoo Kise Naal"	Gippy Grewal	Bhinda Aujla	Veet Baljit
10	"Jadoo Kade Tohaar Shohar"	Gippy Grewal	Bhinda Aujla	Satti Khokhewalia
11	"Yaari Nalo Vadh Cheez"	Diljit Dosanjh	Bhinda Aujla	Raj Kakra
