= Diljit Dosanjh =

Indian-American singer and actor (born 1984)

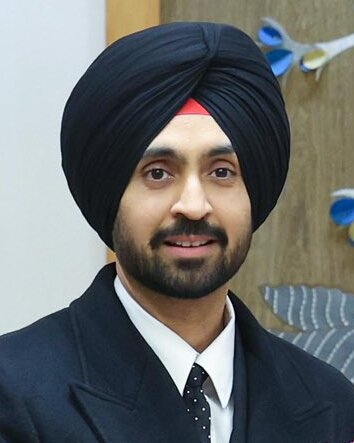
- Dosanjh in c. 2025
- Born: Diljit Singh; 6 January 1984 (age 42); Dosanjh Kalan, Punjab, India
- Citizenship: India (1984–2022); United States (2022–present)
- Occupations: Singer; actor; film producer; Sanjh Foundation
- Years active: 2002–present
- Spouse: Sandeep Kaur
- Children: 1
- Awards: Full list
- Musical career
- Genres: Pop; R&B; hip-hop; pop rap
- Instruments: Vocals; tumbi
- Labels: Warner Music; Sony Music India; Speed Records; Dharam Seva; Moviebox Records; Finetone Cassettes; T-Series; Famous Studios; Zee Music Company; Saregama
- Website: diljitdosanjh.com

Diljit Dosanjh (Punjabi: [d̪ɪldʒiːt̪ d̪oːsáːndʒ], born 6 January 1984) is an Indian-born American singer, actor, and film producer who works in Punjabi music as well as Punjabi and Hindi cinema. His films, including Jatt & Juliet 2 (2013), Sajjan Singh Rangroot (2018), Honsla Rakh (2021), and Jatt & Juliet 3 (2024) are among the highest grossing Punjabi films in history.

Dosanjh began his career in 2002 and gained success in Punjabi music with his albums Smile (2005) and Chocolate (2008), followed by the hit album The Next Level (2009) with Yo Yo Honey Singh. He had a cameo in the Punjabi film Mel Karade Rabba in 2010 and began to pursue acting, debuting as a leading man in The Lion of Punjab in 2011. After his breakthrough in the romantic comedy Jihne Mera Dil Luteya (2011), he established himself with Anurag Singh-directed Jatt & Juliet (2012). The actor-director duo later went on collaborate on multiple hit projects throughout the 2010s. As of 2020, he has won the PTC Award for Best Actor five times. He also starred in the National Award winning film Punjab 1984 (2014).

He made his Bollywood debut in 2016 with the crime thriller Udta Punjab, for which he earned the Filmfare Award for Best Male Debut, in addition to a nomination for the Filmfare Award for Best Supporting Actor. This was followed by Good Newwz (2019), for which he received his second nomination for the Filmfare Award for Best Supporting Actor. He has also appeared as a judge in three seasons of the reality show Rising Star. Dosanjh gained wider acclaim in Hindi cinema for playing the titular role in Imtiaz Ali's biopic Amar Singh Chamkila (2024), earning an International Emmy nomination for Best Performance by an Actor. In 2026, he was part of the ensemble in the highest grossing Indian war film Border 2.

In 2024, Dosanjh performed across the globe on his sold-out, record-breaking Dil-Luminati Tour.

== Early life ==
Diljit Dosanjh was born on 6 January 1984 to a Jat Sikh family in the village of Dosanjh Kalan in Phillaur tehsil, Jalandhar district, Punjab, India. His father, Balbir Singh, is a former employee of Punjab Roadways and his mother, Sukhwinder Kaur, is a homemaker. He has two siblings, one elder sister and one younger brother. During his childhood, Dosanjh moved into his uncle's home in Ludhiana and was schooled at the Guru Harkrishan Public School, due to financial reasons.

== Career ==
=== 2003–2015: Regional success ===
Dosanjh released his first album Ishq Da Uda Ada in 2003 with Finetone Cassettes, a division of T-Series. Rajinder Singh of Finetone, who helped Dosanjh make a debut in the Punjabi music industry, suggested to him to spell his first name as Diljit instead of Daljit.

Dosanjh's popularity soared with the release of his third album, Smile, produced by Sukhpal Sukh, which included the tracks "Nachh Diyan Alran Kuwariyan" and "Paggan Pochviyan Wale." The album was released by Finetone Cassettes in 2005. His next album Ishq Ho Gaya was released in 2006 by Finetone Cassettes. His fifth album, titled Chocolate, came out in 2008.

In 2009, Dosanjh released several different singles – "Bhagat Singh (The Tribute)", "Ego (Me and Myself)" and "No Tension," "Power of Duets" as well.

On 20 August 2009, Dosanjh released his sixth studio album titled The Next Level with music composed by Yo Yo Honey Singh containing 8 tracks, making it one of his most successful albums. The album 's opening track was "Dil Nach Da" which was a huge success followed by tracks, "Panga" which was a gangsta rap track. The album became a hit and received positive reviews.

Dosanjh gave his next song in 2010 for the film Mel Karade Rabba's soundtrack. The track was included in the film during the opening credits.

2011 saw Dosanjh's entry into mainstream Punjabi films. His debut film in the lead role The Lion of Punjab, was released in February 2011. Though the film flopped at the box office, his track "Lak 28 Kudi Da", from the films's soundtrack, composed by and featuring Yo Yo Honey Singh, reached number 1 on the official Asian Download Chart in the US published by the BBC, according to Firstpost. In July 2011, his second Punjabi film Jihne Mera Dil Luteya was released. The film, also featuring Gippy Grewal and Neeru Bajwa, did well. Dosanjh gave vocals to six of the twelve tracks in the film's soundtrack. In November 2011, Dosanjh announced that he would not release his upcoming album Urban Pendu, that included the single "15 Saal", due to the controversy surrounding it. That single, featuring Yo Yo Honey Singh, talked about the promiscuous behaviour of underage girls and their indulgence in alcohol, drugs and tattoos. He wrote on his Facebook page: "It was not my intention to hurt anyone's sentiments. I apologize to my fans who were waiting for this song."

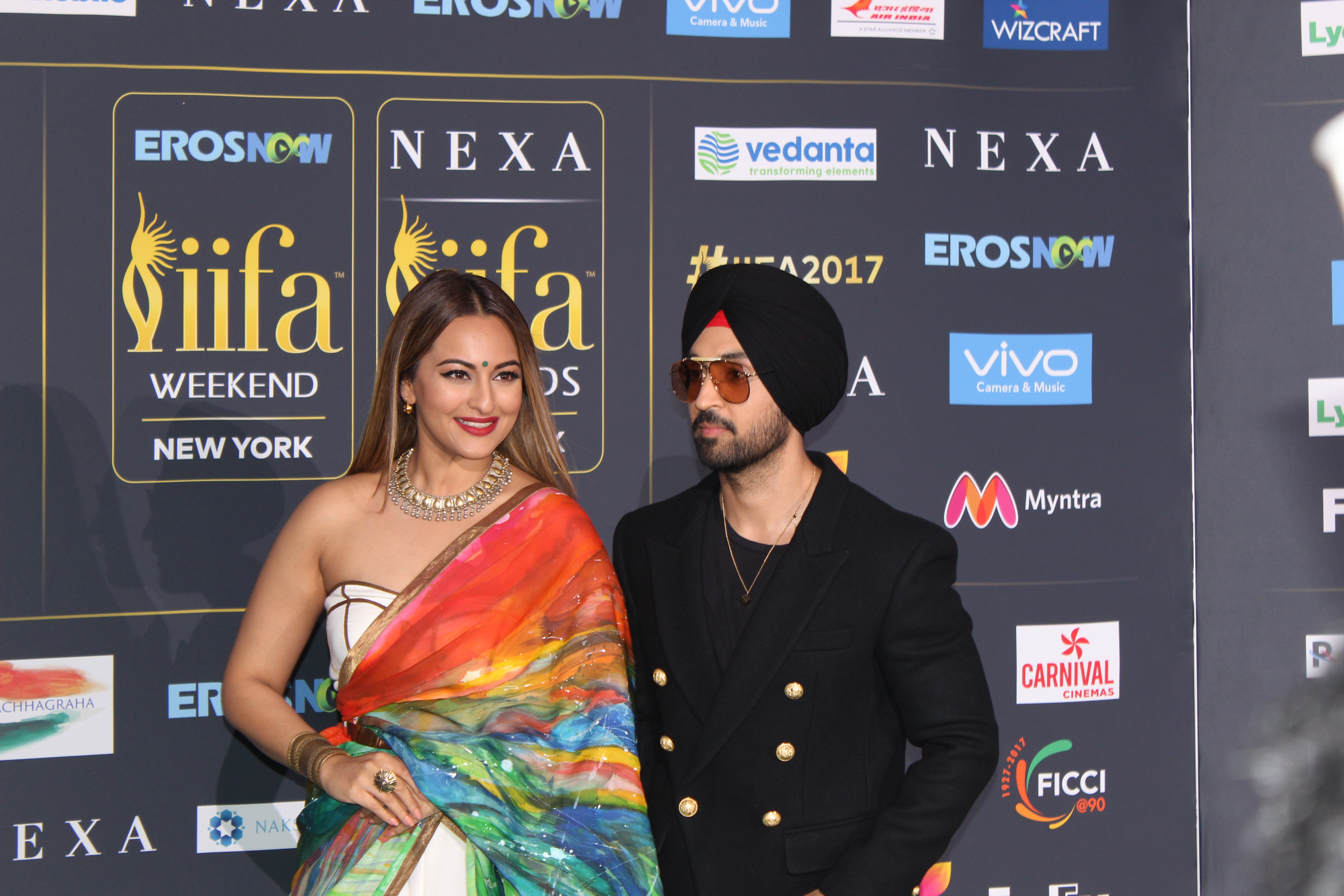
Dosanjh and Sonakshi Sinha at 18th IIFA Awards

Dosanjh continued his collaboration with Yo Yo Honey Singh in 2011 with the track "Goliyan" which was subsequently released as a part of the latter's album International Villager. He next sang for the soundtrack of the Bollywood film Tere Naal Love Ho Gaya, released in January 2012, in a single called "Pee Pa Pee Pa" that also featured Priya Panchal. He also acted in that music video in the film. His subsequent single "Bodyguard", glorified the fall of Libyan revolutionary and politician, Muammar Gaddafi, where Dosanjh sang about his lifestyle, capture and death. His subsequent single "Miss Lonely", was composed by JSL Singh. In March 2012, he released his first religious album titled Sikh. The album featured eight singles and talked about the principles and philosophy of Sikh religion. Dosanjh played a lead role in 2012 film Jatt & Juliet. The movie became one of the biggest hits in the Punjabi film industry. The award-winning film, directed by Anurag Singh, also featured actress Neeru Bajwa and was shot in Punjab and Mumbai in India and Vancouver, British Columbia, Canada. Dosanjh won the PTC Punjabi Film Award for Best Actor for the film. He sang on five of the seven songs in the soundtrack of the film.

The same year in November, he released his eighth album, called Back 2 Basics, with nine tracks and the music composed by Tru Skool. The duo worked together to produce the incredibly popular "Kharku" which won the "Best Bhangra Song of the Year" award at both the Brit Asia TV Music Awards, and the PTC Punjabi Music Awards. In January 2013, Dosanjh's third Punjabi film Saadi Love Story hit the big screens. The film, that also starred Amrinder Gill and Surveen Chawla, flopped at the box office. Dosanjh sang for two songs in the film's soundtrack, which was composed by Jaidev Kumar.

Dosanjh made a guest appearance in the April 2013 Punjabi film Bikkar Bai Sentimental with his track "Main Fan Bhagat Singh Da". Inspired by the success of Jatt & Juliet, the producers of the film released a sequel to the film, titled Jatt & Juliet 2, in June 2013. Dosanjh played the role of a cop in the film. The film had nine songs in the soundtrack, of which four were sung by Dosanjh. He gave vocals for the track "Main Taan Aidaan Hi Nachna" from the soundtrack of the Bollywood film Yamla Pagla Deewana 2, which was released in June 2013. In August 2013, Dosanjh's music video "Proper Patola" was released on Vevo, making it the first Punjabi song to be featured on Vevo. The single, composed by Badshah, received over one million hits on YouTube just within a fortnight of its release. Dosanjh said: "I extend my thanks to all who have liked watching the song. I'm glad to live up to the expectations of all, and with their faith in me." Dosanjh shot for his next Punjabi film Disco Singh, which was released on 11 April 2014. The film, directed and written by Anurag Singh, also features Surveen Chawla and is shot in Delhi NCR. In 2014, he worked for the film Punjab 1984, which is set in the backdrop of 1984–86 Punjab insurgency. The film was released on 27 June 2014 and is directed by Anurag Singh. The film won National Film Award for Best Feature Film in Punjabi. Dosanjh is only the first south Asian artist who visited the US headquarters of Google, Facebook, Twitter, YouTube, and Instagram on the same day. In 2015, he sang in a duet song in Coke Studio @ MTV Season 4, Ki Banu Duniya Da, with the singer Gurdas Maan which was released on 15 August 2015 and was broadcast on 16 August 2015 on MTV India. Dosanjh's second film from 2015 Mukhtiar Chadha was appreciated for his unique role in it. In 2015, the Most Sensational Celebrities (MSC) study among most famous people in Pollywood, the riskiest personalities on the web, Dosanjh was found number one from number five in 2014 thus leaving behind Mika Singh, Gippy Grewal and Harbhajan Mann.

=== 2016–2019: Mainstream expansion ===
Dosanjh next starred in the crime drama Udta Punjab (2016), his first Hindi film. With a worldwide collection of ₹996.7 million, the film proved to be a commercial success. Directed by Abhishek Chaubey, the film deals with the subject of substance abuse in the Indian province of Punjab. Co-starring alongside Kareena Kapoor, Shahid Kapoor and Alia Bhatt, Udta Punjab generated controversy when the Central Board of Film Certification deemed that the film represented Punjab in a negative light and demanded extensive censorship before its theatrical release. The Bombay High Court later cleared the film for exhibition with one scene cut. Dosanjh also sang the song "Ik Kudi" for the film. In a highly positive review, The Hindu said that Dosanjh was "successful" in delivering a "highly hitting performance".

In 2017, Dosanjh starred in Phillauri, alongside Anushka Sharma and Suraj Sharma, a fantasy romantic comedy set in 1910s pre-independence India, where he portrayed a deceased local singer and the lover of a ghost. The film was released on 23 March 2017 and grossed over nearly ₹50 crore during its box-office to emerge a moderate success. Dosanjh's portrayal earned praise for bringing a lean, attractive Sikh lead to Bollywood screens for the first time. In the same year, Dosanjh made his national television debut as an expert/judge on the singing reality series Rising Star, an Indian adaptation of the international series of the same name, which aired on Colors TV. He featured on the show for two subsequent seasons.

In 2018, he returned to Punjabi cinema to star in the war drama that depicts the experiences of Sikh soldiers of the British Indian Army fighting on the Western Front during World War I, titled Sajjan Singh Rangroot in which Dosanjh played the titular character. The film was one of the first of its genre in Pollywood and received acclaim, becoming one of the biggest regional hits in Punjab. In July, he portrayed Indian hockey player Sandeep Singh in the Hindi sports biopic Soorma. The film, which opened to mixed-to-positive reviews, chronicles Singh's rise, his famous drag-flicking technique that earned him the nickname "Flicker Singh," his paralysis after being accidentally shot, and his miraculous recovery to lead India at the Commonwealth Games.

In 2019, he became the first turbaned Sikh to be honoured with a wax figure at Madame Tussauds. Later in the year, he headlined the Bollywood comedy film Good Newwz, alongside Akshay Kumar, Kareena Kapoor and Kiara Advani, which revolves around in vitro fertilisation. The film went on to become one of the highest grossing films of 2019. The film also received positive reviews, holding a 71% fresh rating on Rotten Tomatoes, while noted critic Rajeev Masand praised Dosanjh for his comedic timing and portrayal of the childlike, invasive meddler Honey Batra.

=== 2020–present: Global crossover ===
In 2020, he appeared in social satire Suraj Pe Mangal Bhari alongside Manoj Bajpayee and Fatima Sana Shaikh. The film was released theatrically on 13 November 2020. In the same year, Dosanjh sang a spiritual song, "Paigambar". Later in the year, Dosanjh entered the Social 50 chart by Billboard, following the release of his 11th album G.O.A.T.. The album later rose to the top of Billboard's Top Triller Global chart.

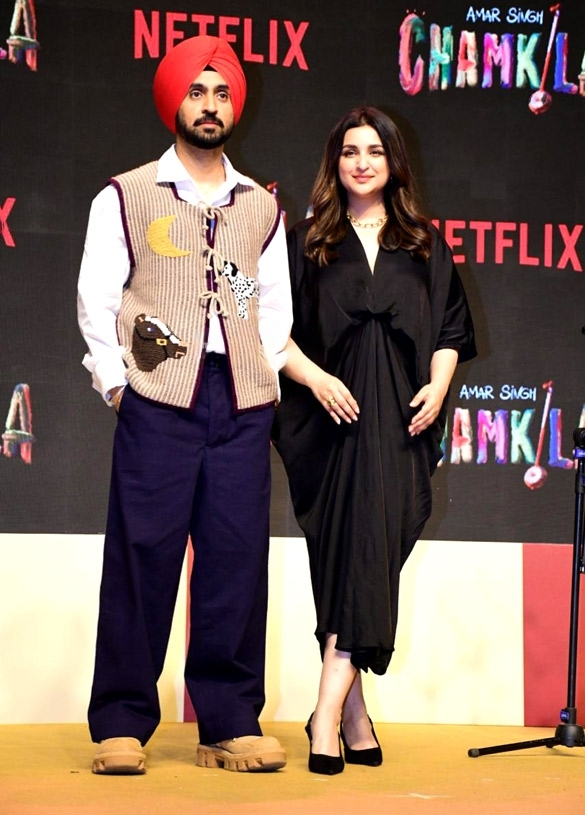
Dosanjh with Parineeti Chopra at Amar Singh Chamkila trailer launch

In 2021, Dosanjh released his twelfth album Moonchild Era, which was penned by Raj Ranjodh and Arjan Dhillon. Album charted at #32 on Billboard Canadian Albums Chart making him the first Indian artist to have his three albums on Billboard charts. In 2021, he made it to the Sikh 100 list. He released his debut film as producer Honsla Rakh starring Sonam Bajwa, Shehnaaz Gill, Shinda Grewal alongside him. The film made 5.05 crore on its opening day making it the highest grossing Punjabi film on openings day. He signed with Warner Music in March 2022.

In April 2023, Dosanjh performed at Coachella Valley Music and Arts Festival, making him the first Indian Punjabi artist to do so.

In 2024, Dosanjh played Punjabi singer Amar Singh Chamkila opposite Parineeti Chopra in Imtiaz Ali film Amar Singh Chamkila, that released on Netflix. In her review for The Week, Suparna Sharma was appreciative of Dosanjh's portrayal and noted, "Diljit's eyes are lively pools of expression and the range of things he can convey just with his eyes is exceptional. As a singer, he is of course in his element here -- confident and engrossed. But he carries Chamkila's fame with the confused smile of someone who can't quite believe what is happening."

Dosanjh performed two songs, "Born to Shine" and "GOAT" on The Tonight Show Starring Jimmy Fallon in June 2024. He sang the promotional song "Bhairava Anthem" where he shared screen with Prabhas for the Telugu sci-fi film Kalki 2898 AD (2024). He played the lead role of an insecure lover alongside Neeru Bajwa in the Punjabi language comedy film Jatt & Juliet 3 directed by Jagdeep Sidhu. Like its predecessors, it received positive reviews and became a major success in Punjabi cinema. It emerged as the 2nd highest grossing Punjabi film of all time.

In 2025, Dosanjh debuted at the Met Gala, embodying his Punjabi heritage with a custom Maharaja ensemble featuring an ivory turban, gold embroidery, a cape, jewellery, and a ceremonial sword. This appearance at the Superfine: Tailoring Black Style themed event highlighted Indian culture alongside fellow Bollywood attendees like Shah Rukh Khan, Kiara Advani, and Priyanka Chopra. According to a Vogue poll, he was voted the best dressed celebrity. The same year, he played the titular character in the poorly received ZEE5 release Detective Sherdil. Around that time, Dosanjh became involved in a controversy regarding the inclusion of Pakistani actress Hania Aamir in his next film Sardaarji 3, following the Pahalgam attack. Dosanjh chose not to release the film in India, opting instead for a release in Pakistan and other territories. This decision led to increased backlash. Despite the controversy, Sardaarji 3 became a commercial success upon its release. He also released his fifteenth studio album, Aura, on 15 October 2025.

Dosanjh reunited with director Anurag Singh for Border 2. He portrayed Indian Air Force flying officer Nirmal Jit Singh Sekhon from No. 18 Squadron. The ensemble led by Sunny Deol, emerged as one of the highest grossing Indian films of 2026. In April 2026, Dosanjh made his second appearance on The Tonight Show Starring Jimmy Fallon, both as a talk show guest and musical performer. During the interview, he discussed the 1914 Komagata Maru incident, noting that his recent concert in Vancouver took place two kilometres from the site where passengers from Punjab were previously denied entry. He performed the song "Morni" on the show, from his third EP, The Call of Punjab, that released in the same month. In May 2026, during Pride Month, the song "Aroma" from the EP, was criticised for its usage of a transphobic slur. He reunited with the director Imtiaz Ali, for the period romance Main Vaapas Aaunga, set during the partition of India, also featuring newcomer Vedang Raina, along with Naseeruddin Shah and Sharvari. The film released in June 2026 to critical acclaim, and emerged a sleeper hit despite an underwhelming opening.

In July 2026, his highly controversial film Satluj, in which he essayed the role of Sikh human rights activist Jaswant Singh Khalra, was released on ZEE5. The film depicts Khalra's struggle to unearth alleged extrajudicial killings during militancy in Punjab. It was earlier supposed to release under the title Panjab '95 in February 2025, but it was indefinitely delayed after the Central Board of Film Certification demanded 120 cuts to the film. The film opened to critical acclaim but was removed for Indian viewers two days after its release by the government. It was subsequently removed from the platform for international viewers as well on 11 July 2026. However, it was heavily pirated and went viral. In September 2026, he released the EP I'm an Artist Bro, the title being a satirical reference to the statement he gave while asked about the 2026 Delhi Jantar Mantar protests, for which he was trolled. Dosanjh sang a rendition of the Hanuman Chalisa for the soundtrack of Namit Malhotra's Ramayana. He performed the song "Pokito" with Daddy Yankee at the 27th Annual Latin Grammy Awards in November 2026.

He is now set to perform at the 2027 Coachella festival.

== Artistry ==
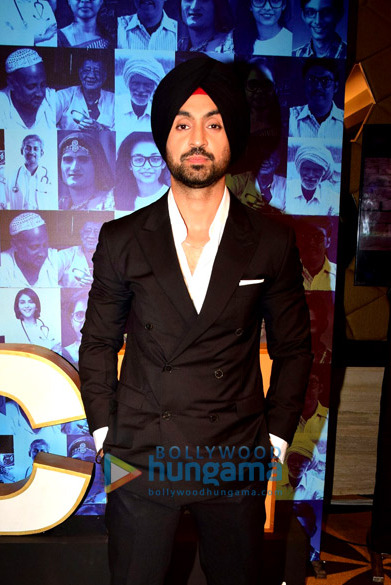
Dosanjh promoting Rising Star in 2018

Continually experimenting with new musical ideas and images, Dosanjh's musical and performance style is the subject of analysis and scrutiny from critics. Dosanjh grew up learning music from Gobinder Singh Alampuri and Kartar Singh, and his initial work reflected their style. His later collaboration with Honey Singh lent a different dimension to his music. The composers Jaidev Kumar, Sukhpal Sukh, Sachin Ahuja, Pavneet Birgi, Jassi Bros Bhinda Aujla, and Tru Skool have all influenced him. His goal is to make a Punjabi song that becomes a worldwide hit like the Korean single "Gangnam Style".

== In the media ==
Dosanjh was ranked in The Times of India's Most Desirable Men at No. 9 in 2016, at No. 13 in 2017, at No. 20 in 2018, at No. 16 in 2019, at No. 14 in 2020.

He was ranked in the Chandigarh Times' Most Desirable Men at No. 2 in 2018, at No. 1 in 2019, at No. 2 in 2020.

In August 2020, he became the first Punjabi artist to get featured at Times Square in New York City.

In 2026, Time magazine named him to its TIME100 Next India list, recognising him as one of India's emerging influential figures.

=== Brand endorsements ===
In August 2015, Coca-Cola signed Dosanjh as brand endorser for Punjab, India. Flipkart, India's leading e-commerce company chose Dosanjh for its Flipkart Connect campaign for Punjab. Dosanjh was appointed the brand ambassador of Season 4 of the Star Sports Pro Kabbadi along with Rana Daggubati and Puneeth Rajkumar. He sang and performed the Pro Kabbadi League theme song "Asli Panga", produced by Yo Yo Honey Singh. In October 2024, Dosanjh was appointed as the brand ambassador of the lifestyle and luggage brand Mokobara.

== Personal life ==
Dosanjh became a US citizen in 2022. He is married to Sandeep Kaur, an American citizen. The couple has a son.

== Discography ==
- DIL (2002)
- Ishq Da Uda Aada (2002)
- Haysha (UK) (2004)
- Smile (India & Canada)
  Over Exposure (UK) (2005)
- Ishq Ho Gaya (2008)
- Chocolate (2008)
- The Next Level (2009)
- Sikh (2012)
- Back 2 Basics (2012)
- Con.fi.den.tial (2018)
- Roar (2018)
- G.O.A.T. (2020)
- MoonChild Era (2021)
- Ghost (2023)
- Aura (2025)

== Filmography ==
=== Films ===
Key
†	Denotes films that have not yet been released

==== Punjabi ====
Year	Title	Role	Notes
2010	Mel Karade Rabba	Rajveer Dhillon	Cameo
2011	The Lion of Punjab	Avtar Singh	
2011	Jihne Mera Dil Luteya	Gurnoor Singh Randhawa	
2012	Jatt & Juliet	Fateh Singh	
2013	Saadi Love Story	Rajveer (Billa)	
2013	Jatt & Juliet 2	Fateh Singh	
2014	Disco Singh	Laatu	
2014	Punjab 1984	Shivjeet Singh Mann (Shiva)	
2015	Sardaarji	Jaggi	
2015	Mukhtiar Chadha	Mukthtiar Chadha	Also screenwriter
2016	Ambarsariya	Jatt Ambarsariya	
2016	Sardaarji 2	Sardaarji Jaggi Singh, Sardaarji Athraa Singh & Sardaarji Satkaar Singh (Note: Diljit Dosanjh plays in a triple role films.)	Triple role
2017	Super Singh	Sajjan Singh aka Sam aka Super Singh	
2018	Sajjan Singh Rangroot	Sajjan Singh	
2019	Shadaa	Chadta	
2021	Honsla Rakh	Varyaam Singh Waraich aka Yenky	Also producer
2022	Babe Bhangra Paunde Ne	Jaggi	Also producer
2023	Jodi	Sitaara	
2024	Jatt & Juliet 3	Fateh Singh	Also producer
2025	Sardaar Ji 3	Jaggi Singh	Also producer
2027	Ranna Ch Dhanna †	TBA	

==== Hindi ====
Year	Title	Role	Notes
2012	Tere Naal Love Ho Gaya	Himself	Special appearance in song "Pee Pa Pee Pa"
2016	Udta Punjab	Sartaaj Singh	
2017	Phillauri	Roop Lal Phillauri	
2018	Welcome to New York	Teji	
2018	Soorma	Sandeep Singh	
2019	Arjun Patiala	Arjun Patiala	
2019	Good Newwz	Honey Batra	
2020	Suraj Pe Mangal Bhari	Suraj	
2022	Jogi	Joginder "Jogi" Singh	
2024	Crew	Jaiveer "Jai" Singh	
2024	Amar Singh Chamkila	Amar Singh Chamkila	
2025	Detective Sherdil	Sherdil	
2026	Border 2	Fg Offr Nirmal Jit Singh Sekhon, PVC	
2026	Main Vaapas Aaunga	Nirvair Grewal	
2026	Satluj	Jaswant Singh Khalra	

=== Television ===
Year	Title	Role	Notes
2010	Awaaz Punjab Di	Himself	Host; reality show
2012	PTC Punjabi Film Awards 2012	Himself	Host; television special
2013	PTC Punjabi Film Awards 2013	Himself	Host; television special
2014	PTC Punjabi Film Awards 2014	Himself	Host; television special
2017–2019	Rising Star	Himself	Judge; reality show
2024	The Tonight Show Starring Jimmy Fallon	Himself	Performance only
2026	The Tonight Show Starring Jimmy Fallon	Himself	Appearance on talk show as well as performance
