= The Stoneman Murders =

2009 film by Manish Gupta

- Theatrical release poster
- Directed by: Manish Gupta
- Written by: Manish Gupta
- Produced by: Bobby Bedi; Sheetal V. Talwar
- Starring: Kay Kay Menon; Arbaaz Khan; Vikram Gokhale; Rukhsar Rehman
- Edited by: Sanjib Datta
- Music by: Siddhartth-Suhas
- Release date: 13 February 2009
- Running time: 115 minutes
- Country: India
- Language: Hindi

The Stoneman Murders is a 2009 Indian neo-noir crime thriller film based on the real life Stoneman serial killings that made headlines in the early 1980s in Bombay. The helpless victims of the mystery killer, who was never caught, were footpath dwellers in Bombay. They were stoned to death in their sleep. The movie weaves fiction around reality in an attempt to provide answers to the questions around the case. The Stoneman Murders was director Manish Gupta's first full-length feature film.

== Plot ==
The serial killer dubbed 'Stoneman' by the media has just claimed his fifth victim and the case is still of little interest to the Bombay police. But to suspended sub-inspector Sanjay Shelar (for custodial death of a gangster) this killer poses an opportunity for reinstatement. With the secret aid of his patronizing superior AIG Satam, Sanjay takes up the arduous process of tracking the murderer without any legal assistance. He asks help from an aide constable and friend Kamble whose wife has apparently run away. The official investigator of the case, Inspector Kedar Phadke, clashes incessantly with Sanjay. They, separately, delve deeper into the case, patrolling the city on their own. Sanjay takes the help of his informer Ghanshu who tells him about Mohammed, a cab driver operating only at midnight, whom everyone on the streets is starting to suspect as being the Stoneman. Ghanshu is eventually also murdered on the footpath by the Stoneman. The Stoneman is shown to be killing people sleeping on the streets (beggars, workers, sweepers etc.). Another night the Stoneman tries to kill a beggar sleeping on the roadside but is saved by Kedar and some patrolling policemen. Kedar sees Sanjay and now starts to suspect him as the murderer. Sanjay finds that his private investigation room has been visited by the Stoneman as he sees vermillion smeared everywhere in the room. He also learns that Mohammed has run away from the city.

Sanjay contemplates possible danger to his wife Manali and asks her to leave for her village. At the railway station he encounters the Stoneman again, trying to kill another roadside man. Before he can catch him, Kedar with his team arrives and shoots Sanjay in the thigh, thinking him to be the killer. Sanjay escapes and the incident brings him closer to his wife who nurses his wounds. A search is out in the city for Sanjay now, who goes into hiding. He researches and realizes the killer himself is a policeman, from Kusumi Tribe, performing tantric rituals to cure impotency that calls for human sacrifices. He asks his trusted cop Kamble to tell this to AIG Satam, giving his research documents as evidence. In the climax, it is shown that Mohammed was only an ex-convict deployed by Kedar as a decoy to roam the streets at the latter's orders, and Kamble turns out to be the killer Stoneman when Sanjay arranges to meet him. Kamble attacks Sanjay with a stone about to commit his ninth and last murder, but both are saved by the police (Kedar and team). In a trap laid by the police in the hospital, when Kamble sneaks in to kill Sanjay, he is nabbed and the matter is closed. Satam and Phadke decide to hush up the case. Kamble is shot and buried in the jungle by Sanjay at Satam's orders. He tells Sanjay that he cannot be taken back into the police force.

In the end, a tantric is shown in Kamble's village performing a ritual, asking a man to make nine human sacrifices and this time to kill people in Calcutta. The story ends showing killings in Bombay and Calcutta in 1983 and 1987.

== Cast ==
- Kay Kay Menon as Sanjay Shellar: a hot-headed suspended police sub-inspector unofficially investigates the case in the hope of getting back into the police force.
- Arbaaz Khan as Inspector Kedar Phadke: the official investigator who is more interested in winning against Sanjay than in his assignment of tracking down the killer.
- Vikram Gokhale as AIG Satam: Sanjay's senior who comes to his aid by unofficially letting Sanjay continue his investigation and to save his job.
- Rukhsaar Rehman as Manali Shellar
- Virendra Saxena as Kamble
- Ashraful Haque as Ghanshu
- Rajesh Balwani as Police psychiatrist
- Annu Shah as a slum landlord
- Rashid as pimp
- Vishwajeet Soni as eunuch
- Ashok Raj as a cook
- Ali Shah as Mohammad Reza
- Changazi Khan as beggar in subway
- Vikram Sahoo as Commissioner
- Jayshankar Tripathi as AIG's constable
- Veebha Anand as Sanjay's daughter
- Yogita Dandaykar as bar singer
- Satish Kumar as man at the PCO
- Priya Ahuja as Rukhsana
- Dhanu Mangela as bar bouncer
- Suleman Sheikh as bar-tender
- Pushpender Sain as pavement dweller boy
- Sameer Khan as a beggar boy
- Manju Chauhan as a beggar girl
- Jagdish Sen as a villager
- Rachana Maurya as the lead dancer in the bar (item number)

== Production ==
The research that went into the scripting of The Stoneman Murders involved an intensive search for newspaper articles dating to 1983 (when the killings took place). The director Manish Gupta and his team combed the Asiatic Library, the Government Archival Library at Elphinstone College, the Times of India archives and the archival departments of Indian Express, Maharashtra Times, Navbharat Times and other newspapers. Before this, the preliminary research done by the director was over the internet where a few articles about the Stoneman had been posted. The dates obtained from the internet were later used to carry out more detailed research in the libraries and newspaper archives.

Before the shooting of the film, the director and his team visited nearly all the known murder sites, like the area surrounding Tilak Hospital in Sion, the Gandhi Market near King's Circle, the area outside Matunga police station, Rafi Ahmed Kidwai Road in Wadala and one small street in Lalbaug. The visits to these sites were made late at night to enable the creative team to absorb a feel of the area and the eerie late-night ambiance, which was later recreated in the film in terms of location selection, photography and the general styling of the film.

The production team had to re-create the look of 1980s Bombay despite the fact that cars, shops, and advertisements had changed. The pavements where the murders took place were made of black tar unlike the multi-colored jigsaw shaped tiles of today. This restricted the shooting in myriad manners. For the wide shots of pavements, the unit often had to cover half a kilometer of pavement with black tarpaulin sheets to achieve the look of a tar footpath. The unit often waited until the late night before rolling the camera since they needed all modern vehicles off the roads. Often some vehicles remained parked on the road and had to be covered by black tarpaulins. Likewise, the neon hoardings and contemporary advertisements were hidden by 1980s style advertisements and film posters that were sourced out painstakingly by the art director from obscure raddi shops.

The sound design of the film was also done after thorough research. Hit film songs from the period depicted were used along with famous radio jingles and TV commercials of that era.

== Soundtrack ==
The music was composed by Siddharth-Suhas and released by Times Music.

The Stoneman Murders

Soundtrack album by Siddharth-Suhas
- Released: 2009
- Recorded: 2009
- Genre: Soundtrack
- Length: 26:22
- Label: Times Music
- Producer: Siddharth-Suhas

Track list
No.	Title	Lyrics	Singer(s)	Length
1.	"Qaatilaana"	Kumaar	Sunidhi Chauhan	3:34
2.	"Sooni Sooni Raah Pe"	Kumaar	Suraj Jagan	4:04
3.	"Stoneman"	Manish Gupta	Suhas Shetty	2:33
4.	"Midnight At Matunga"		Instrumental	2:26
5.	"The Stoneman Cometh"		Instrumental	2:36
6.	"Killer In The Kholi"		Instrumental	1:43
7.	"The Chase"		Instrumental	2:49
8.	"The Ritual"		Instrumental	3:41
9.	"Requiem To The Stoneman"		Instrumental	2:56
Total length:				26:22

== Reception ==
Nikhat Kazmi of Times of India gave The Stoneman Murders a 3-star rating out of 5 and praised it for its gripping story and taut performances. "The film has an ample thrill quotient with the shadowy frame of the Stoneman flitting across on one hand and the police department, especially Arbaaz Khan, holding the renegade cop, Kay Kay Menon, as the prime suspect. Once again, Mumbai and its alleys which turn sinister by night, tower prominently as the perfect backdrop of a film which boasts of some high-tension moments. But the real lure is Kay Kay's full-bodied portrayal of the trigger-happy cop who is wedded to his duty, yet doesn't mind a bit of black money."

Nithya Ramani of Rediff.com praises TSM, writing, "Writer-director Manish Gupta does a wonderful job in telling the story, which has a very realistic touch. Despite being a murder mystery, Gupta avoids gore and bloodshed, and makes it visually appealing. The story keeps you on the edge of your seat, occasionally sending a chill down your spine."

Noyon Jyoti Parasara of AOL India gave the film a 2.5 out of 5 and wrote, "Overall, The Stoneman Murders is an honest portrayal of 'what could have been'. But it's not as gripping as it should have been. Nonetheless it's a novel concept and worth a watch…for Kay Kay, if nothing else."

== See also ==
- Raman Raghav
- Raman Raghav 2.0
