= Banjara (2018 film) =

2018 Indian Punjabi-language film

- Film poster
- Directed by: Mushtaq Pasha
- Screenplay by: Dheeraj Rattan
- Story by: Krishan sharma
- Starring: Babbu Maan; Rana Ranbir; Shraddha Arya; Sara Khatri; Jiya Mustafa
- Cinematography: Binendra Menon; Pankaj Kathuria
- Edited by: Bunty Saini
- Music by: surinder Maan
- Production companies: Ohri Productions; Rana Ahluwalia; Maan Films; Ameri-Can Systems; Motion Pictures
- Distributed by: World Cinema Partners (United States and Canada)
- Release date: 7 December 2018
- Running time: 132 minutes
- Country: India
- Language: Punjabi

Banjara (transl. Nomad) is a 2018 Indian Punjabi-language drama film directed by Mushtaq Pasha. The film stars Babbu Maan in a triple role alongside, Sarah Khatri, Rana Ranbir, Gurpreet Bhangu, Jiya Mustafa and Shraddha Arya. It is Maan's first film released after Baaz (2014). The film is based on the life of truck drivers and the film highlights the eras of 1947, 1984 and 2018, presenting the love stories of the three generations. The film was theatrically released on 7 December 2018.

== Cast ==
- Babbu Maan in a Triple role as
  - Harnek Singh
  - Binder Singh
  - Nachhatar Singh
- Rana Ranbir
- Gurpreet Bhangu
- Jiya Mustafa
- Shraddha Arya
- Malkit Rauni
- Prakash Yadu
- Sara Khatri
- Sunny Sandhu

== Production ==
=== Development ===
Mushtaq Pasha the director of the film wanted to sign a film with Babbu Maan since last 10 years but Maan rejected his as he doesn't want to do action or comedies which were being told by Pasha. As, Babbu Maan is from family who used to have trucks and he also has personal interest in trucks so he suggested Pasha to create a film on trucks. Then, Pasha started working on the project and the story was written Dheeraj Rattan and dialogues by Surmeet Maavi. And hence, the project started and was titled as "Banjara" which refers to "traveller" in Punjabi.

=== Casting ===
As the story consists of three love stories of three generations of a family grandfather, father and son respectively. So, it was difficult task to cast three actors and actress. Then, Pasha suggested Maan to play all three roles as all the characters are from same family and the minor difference would be created by make-up. In all Maan's films every time new faces are seen as he is willing to give chance to new performers in Punjabi cinema so the three television actresses Shraddha Arya, Jiya Mustafa and Sara Khatri were cast opposite to Maan. The film also stars Rana Ranbir, Gurpreet Bhangu, Rana Ahluwalia in supporting roles.

=== Filming ===
Principal photography of Banjara took place in Canada, Punjab and Suratgarh, Rajasthan between January 2018 and February 2018 where Binendra Menon served as a cinematographer. The principal photography of old part of the film shot in Suratgarh took place in January 2018 whereas next schedule of the film was shot in Canada in February 2018.

== Soundtrack ==
Banjara

Soundtrack album by Babbu Maan
- Released: 21 November 2018
- Recorded: 2018
- Genre: Feature film soundtrack
- Length: 27:43
- Language: Punjabi
- Label: Swag Music

The soundtrack of the film is also composed by Babbu Maan. All the songs in the film are written, sung and composed by himself only. All the songs were released on iTunes, Google Play Music and all other platforms on 21 November 2018 by record label Swag Music. "Tralla 2" song from the soundtrack got huge response from audience and has been viewed million times on YouTube.

No.	Title	Singer(s)	Length
1.	"Jua"	Babbu Mann
2.	"Safar"	Babbu Mann, Shreya Ghoshal
3.	"Nachne Da Mood"	Babbu Mann
4.	"Tralla 2"	Babbu Mann
5.	"Dil Ta Dil Hai"	Babbu Mann

== Release ==
Initially, the film was scheduled to release in mid-2018 later, was postponed to 14 September 2018. In September, the film was postponed second time and was released on 7 December 2018. The official trailer of the film was launched on 30 October 2018 at Elante Mall, Chandigarh. Banjara was released in 114 theatres worldwide including 49 in India, 31 in North America and 25 in Oceania.

=== Home Media Release ===
The film is now available for streaming on the Chaupal OTT platform.

== Reception ==
=== Box office ===
Banjara has grossed est. ₹6.9 crore worldwide in its opening weekend, including est. ₹1.65 crore in India and ₹3.25 crore in other territories including ₹2.54 crore in United States, ₹1.64 crore in Canada, ₹2.1 crore in United Kingdom, ₹17.02 lacs in Australia, ₹7.17 lacs in New Zealand.

=== Critical reception ===
Jasmine Singh of The Tribune gave just 1 star out of 5 and calls the film "Strictly for Babbu Maan fans". Singh criticised the story and dialogues of the film saying, "If you don’t find a storyline, any hard-hitting effective dialogues, you will at least find the truck, in the old and the new versions."

And also criticised the cast, "It is in this phase that Babbu Mann talks in a pre-partition language, which sounds amusing and very forced. The story shifts from here to present day Vancouver where you are numbed by Babbu Mann’s dead pan expression (he lets his eyes do all the talking and acting), Shraddha Arya’s over acting, Rana Ranbir’s completely put on and fake Canadian Punjabi accent, and the omnipresent truck."

In last added, "If you have set out to find anything other than the truck and Babbu Mann in the film, then you will be completely disheartened but if this is all you wanted to see, you’ve hit the right road!"
