= Faruk Kabir =

Indian actor and director (born 1983) Married to Rukshar Rehman

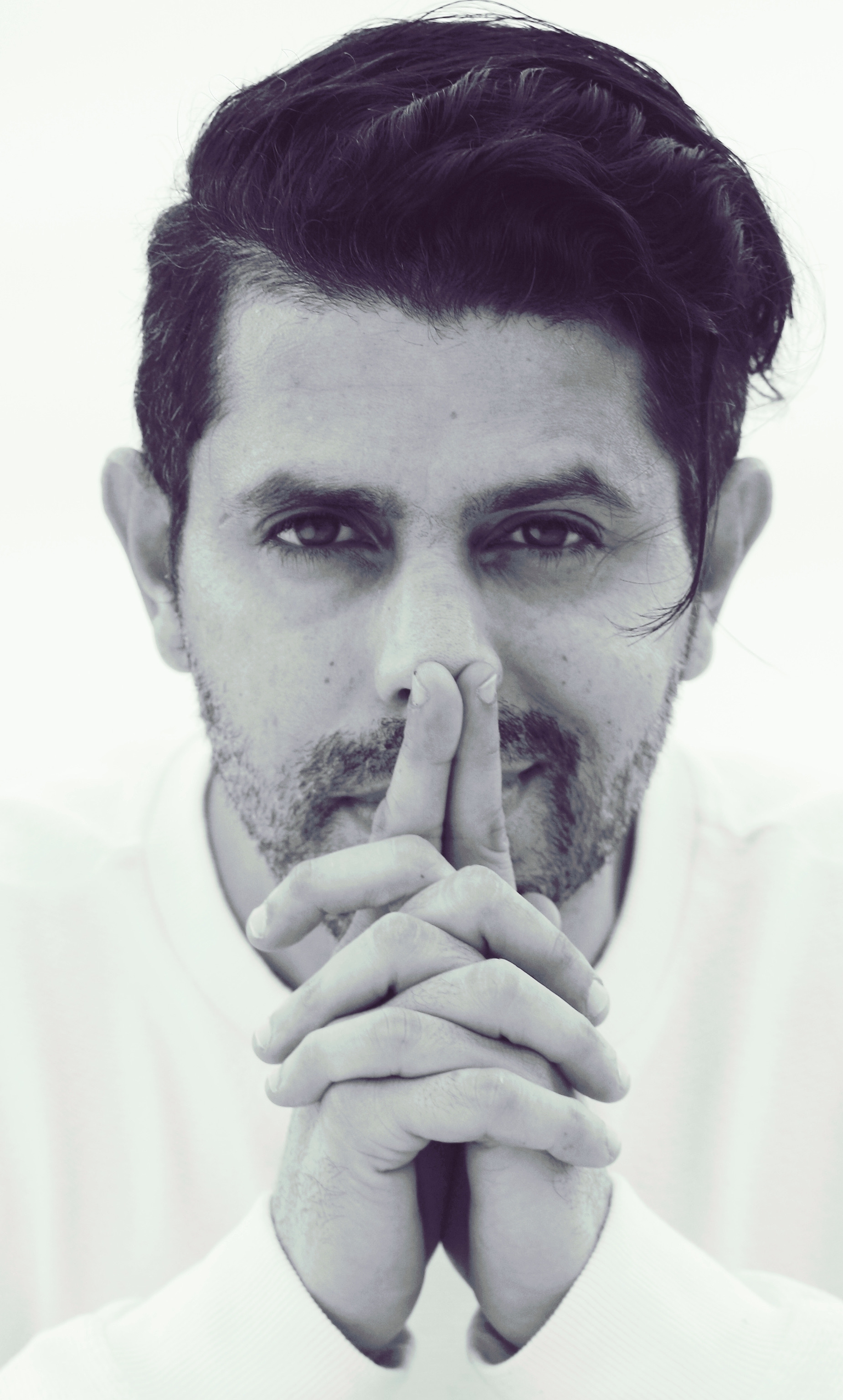
- Born: 18 March 1983 (age 43); Delhi, India
- Occupations: Film director, Producer, screenwriter
- Years active: 2000–present
- Notable work: Salakaar; Khuda Haafiz; Allah Ke Banday; The Awakening

Faruk Kabir (born 18 March 1983) is an Indian film director, writer and producer who is mainly known for his work in Hindi films. Kabir started his career as an assistant director in films like Phir Bhi Dil Hai Hindustani and Asoka. He made his directorial debut in 2006 with The Awakening, a short film, starring Ajay Devgn. He then rose to fame with Allah Ke Banday, which he directed and acted in as well.

== Career ==
Having started his career at a young age of 18 as an assistant director to veterans like Aziz Mirza and Santosh Sivan, Kabir worked on films like Phir Bhi Dil Hai Hindustani and Asoka. He then joined the New York Film Academy (NYFA) in screenwriting and filmmaking. He was also an assistant director on the film Pyaar Ishq Aur Mohabbat.

Kabir later became an independent director with the acclaimed documentary Unheard Voices of the People of India, for which he travelled 27,000 kilometres by road. The documentary was produced by Saeed Mirza. In 2006, he marked his directorial debut with the short film The Awakening, which starred Ajay Devgan. The film brought forth the issue of water disasters, and was applauded by the audiences.

Kabir debuted as a director and actor for feature films with Allah Ke Banday, which brought together an ensemble star cast including Naseeruddin Shah, Sharman Joshi, Atul Kulkarni to name a few. The film, which dealt with juvenile crime, was well received by the audiences. The film was also screened at the Chicago Film Festival. The film went on to receive 13 nominations in 2011, including Best Debut Director nominations for Kabir at the Filmfare and Star Screen Awards and others at the Stardust, Balaji and IIFA Awards.

Kabir has also directed over a dozen music videos with artists like Sanober and Jassi. Kabir is a part of and has associated with the Super Fight League, which holds martial arts related events that are aired on Indian television. He collaborated with SFL and BodyPower UK for the Body Power Expo which was held in March 2014. Kabir has expertise in Boxing, Taekwondo, Brazilian Jujutsu, Judo and the Israeli combat art of Krav Maga.

In 2020, Kabir wrote and directed Khuda Haafiz, a direct-to-OTT action thriller that emerged as one of Disney+ Hotstar's most-watched titles of the year. Its sequel, Khuda Haafiz: Chapter 2 – Agni Pariksha (2022), saw Kabir again take on writing, directing, action direction, and choreography, drawing positive audience response . In 2025, Faruk's Recent Release Salakaar, an espionage thriller inspired by real events, Premieres on JioHotstar.

=== Shockers ===
Kabir is currently directing Shockers, India's first horror web series, which he has created in association with Spiders Web, his production house. The series currently airs on online platform Hotstar, and features actors like Kalki Koechlin, Dia Mirza, Amit Sadh, Amyra Dastur, Rajat Barmecha, Neha Mahajan, Jaideep Ahlawat and Prateik Babbar. Season 3 is rumored to have Arjun Rampal.

=== Khuda Haafiz (2020) ===
In 2020, Kabir wrote and directed Khuda Haafiz, a direct-to-OTT action thriller released on Disney+ Hotstar. The film emerged as one of the platform's most-watched titles of the year and received widespread audience appreciation.

=== Khuda Haafiz: Chapter II – Agni Pariksha (2022) ===
Kabir followed with Khuda Haafiz: Chapter 2 – Agni Pariksha in 2022, continuing the story of the lead characters Sameer and Nargis. He served not only as writer and director but also as action director and choreographer. The film received a positive audience response and was nominated at the Filmfare Awards and Zee Cine Awards in the "Best Action Film" category.

=== Salakaar (2025) ===
Kabir's upcoming work, Salakaar, is an espionage thriller inspired by true events. Co-written and directed by him, the series stars Naveen Kasturia, Mouni Roy, Surya Sharma, and Mukesh Rishi. Its story explores a buried Cold War weapon, a covert mole, and a spymaster's haunting past. The series is slated to premiere on Disney+ Hotstar on 15 August 2025 ).

=== Other Work ===
Apart from directing and acting in films, Kabir has also directed over a dozen music videos with T-Series, and artists like Sanober, Jassi and Mikka. He has also produced for the NCPA Theatre Festival with plays like Bade Miyan Diwanae and Falsafa, and has also directed TVCs for UP Tourism, Jabong and Tata to name a few. He has also been an Honorary Creative Director for Mumbai's largest out of home media company, RoshanSpace.

== Personal life ==
Kabir married actress Rukhsar Rehman in 2010. Rukhsar and Kabir were in a relationship for six years before they tied the knot on 23 March 2010. In July 2023, the couple announced their separation.

== Filmography ==
Year	Title	Role	Notes
2005	Unheard Voices of the People of India	Director	Documentary film
2006	The Awakening	Director	
2010	Allah Ke Banday	Actor, director, writer	
2019	377 Ab Normal	Director	Released on ZEE5
2020	Khuda Haafiz	Director, writer	
2022	Khuda Haafiz: Chapter 2 – Agni Pariksha	Director, writer, lyricist	
2025	Salakaar	Director, Co-Writer	Released on JioHotstar
