= Harjit Harman =

Indian singer (born 1975)

- Born: 14 July 1975 (age 51)
- Origin: Doda village, near Nabha, East Punjab
- Genres: Punjabi, bhangra, romantic, pop
- Occupation: Singer
- Years active: 1999–present
- Website: www.harjitharman.com

Harjit Harman (Punjabi: ਹਰਜੀਤ ਹਰਮਨ) is an Indian singer songwriter and actor associated with Punjabi language music and films.

Harman released his solo album Zanjeeri in 2002. He has since produced several albums including Panjebaan, Mundri and Hoor. In 2011, his album Shaan-E-Quam (Pride of the Nation) was nominated for the Global Indian Music Awards in the category "Best Folk Album".

== Filmography ==
Year	Movie	Role	Notes	Record label	Music
2009	Tera Mera Ki Rishta	Guest appearance song	With Pammi Bai, Lehmber Hussainpuri	Tips	Jaidev Kumar
2012	Raula Pai Gaya	Guest appearance	With Ravinder Grewal	Goyal Music	Ravinder Grewal
2012	Desi Romeos	Sandhu	With Babbu Maan, Bhupinder Gill	Point Zero	Babbu Maan
2013	Moga to Melbourne Via Chandigarh		Azure Productions		
2018	Kurmaiyan	Harjeet			

== Discography ==
Year	Album	Record label	Tracks	Music
1999	Kudi Chiran Ton Vichhari	Saregama, RPG	8	Ali Posley
2001	Zanjeeri	T-Series	9	Atul Sharma
2002	Tere Pain Bhulekhe	Lucky Star Entertainment	8	Atul Sharma
2003	Mutiyare	T-Series	9	Atul Sharma
2004	Punjebaan	T-Series	9	Atul Sharma
2005	Singh Soorme	T-Series	9	Atul Sharma
2007	Mundri	T-Series	9	Atul Sharma
2009	Hoor	T-Series	9	Atul Sharma
2010	Shaan-E-Kaum	T-Series	9	Atul Sharma
2012	Jhanjhar	T-Series	9	Atul Sharma
2020	24 Carat	T-Series	9	Atul Sharma

== Achievements and awards ==
- Shaan-E-Quam was nominated for IGMA Awards.
