= Singh Better Than King =

Studio album by Babbu Maan
- Released: 16 November 2009
- Genre: Punjabi, religious, bhangra
- Length: 44:50
- Producer: Babbu Maan

Babbu Maan chronology
Aao Sare Naciye 2	Singh Better Than King	Ekam - Son of Soil

Singles from Singh Better Than King
- 1. "Ik Baba Nanak Si"; 2. "Marno Mool Na Darde"

Singh Better Than King is the tenth studio album, and his first religious album, by the Punjabi singer Babbu Maan, released on 16 November 2009. The album was also released in the USA, Canada and the UK.

The album was preceded by the lead single, "Ik Baba Nanak Si". The song was Mann's first religious single. Following the success of the single, "Marno Mool Na Darde" was released and was also successful. The album received good reviews.

== Track listing ==
Indian Edition
No.	Title	Length
1.	"Ik Baba Nanak Si"	4:39
2.	"Att de shikari"	6:23
3.	"Sangraand"	6:06
4.	"Kaum De Heere"	6:27
5.	"Khalsa"	3:36
6.	"Waheguru"	5:15
7.	"Soorveer"	6:07
8.	"Pawan Guru Paani Pita"	6:16
