= Naoki Kusumi =

Japanese artist (born 1972)

- Born: 1972 (age 53–54)
- Education: Apprenticed with master plaster craftsmen
- Known for: Sakan (Japanese plasterwork)
- Notable work: Heisei-no-in tea house at Kinkaku-ji, Tokyu Plaza Ginza, Wadakura restaurant at Palace Hotel Tokyo
- Style: Traditional sakan techniques with contemporary style
- Movement: Contemporary sakan

Naoki Kusumi (久住有生 Kusumi Naoki; born 1972) is an artist of the Japanese sakan (plasterwork) school. sakan (plasterwork) refers to Japanese plasterwork. It is a traditional Japanese craft technique, using natural materials. to plaster buildings such as tea houses and storehouses. Recently it has become a contemporary art form, with modern artists using traditional sakan (plasterwork) techniques in new styles.

== Career ==
One of the most prominent contemporary sakan (plasterwork) artists is Naoki Kusumi. He is the 3rd generation of a sakan (plasterwork) artisan family. He started learning the art of plasterwork from the age of 3. He apprenticed with many master plaster craftsmen and formed his own plasterwork business at the age of 23.

He has vast experience in plastering both interior and exterior walls. His works are unique as they combine traditional sakan (plasterwork) techniques with his own unique style. As his craft is traditional, he is often involved in restoration projects, such as the world-famous Kinkaku-ji Golden Pavilion in Kyoto.

As a testament to his versatility, he often creates works in modern establishments, including high-end commercial spaces such as the Tokyu Plaza shopping mall in Ginza, and bars and restaurants in luxury Tokyo hotels such as the Palace Hotel, Tokyo.

He has also created sakan (plasterwork) works overseas in France, Germany, China and Singapore

He has appeared in Japanese magazines and has made numerous TV appearances on Japanese National TV explaining his work and other forms of interior design

== Notable projects ==
- The tea house of Heisei-no-in at the Kinkaku-ji Golden Pavilion, Kyoto (2002)

- Indonesian Embassy, Tokyo (2007)

- Lounge space in the main building of Tokyo National Museum in Ueno, Tokyo (2008)

- Wadakura restaurant at the Palace Hotel, Tokyo (2012)

- Bar at Grand Prince Hotel Takanawa, Tokyo (2016)

- Tokyu Plaza shopping mall, Ginza, Tokyo (2016)

- Premium Dining Floor at Roppongi Hills Leisure Complex, Tokyo (2018)
