= Khant =

Khant may refer to:

== People ==
- Khanty people, in Russia

=== Surname ===
- Aleksandr Khant (born 1985), Russian filmmaker
- Jeetmal Khant, Indian politician
- Savitaben Khant (died 2012), Indian politician

== Other uses ==
- Khant, Punjab, a village in India
- Khanty language
