= Mouni Roy =

Indian actress (born 1985)

- Roy in 2026
- Born: 28 September 1985 (age 41); Cooch Behar, West Bengal, India
- Education: Miranda House; Jamia Millia Islamia
- Occupation: Actress
- Years active: 2006–present
- Spouse: Suraj Nambiar (m. 2022; div. 2026)

Mouni Roy (Bengali pronunciation: [mou̯ni rae̯]; born 28 September 1985) is an Indian actress who primarily works in Hindi television and films. One of the highest-paid television actresses in India, Roy is widely known for her portrayal of a shape-shifting snake in Naagin (2015–2016) and its sequel Naagin 2 (2016–2017). She is a recipient of several awards, including an IIFA Award and two ITA Awards, as well as nominations for two Filmfare Awards.

Roy started her acting career in 2006 with the television show Kyunki Saas Bhi Kabhi Bahu Thi. She then portrayed Sati in Devon Ke Dev...Mahadev and Meera in Junoon – Aisi Nafrat Toh Kaisa Ishq. Roy made her film debut with Hero Hitler in Love (2011). She made her Bollywood film debut with Gold (2018), receiving nomination for the Filmfare Award for Best Female Debut. In 2022, Roy received praise for the fantasy film Brahmāstra: Part One – Shiva, which earned her the IIFA Award for Best Supporting Actress and a nomination for the Filmfare Award for Best Supporting Actress.

== Early life and education ==
Roy was born in Cooch Behar, West Bengal on 28 September 1985, into a Bengali-speaking Rajbangsi family. Her grandfather, Shekhar Chandra Roy, was a well-known Jatra theatre artist. Her mother Mukti was a theatre artist, and her father Anil Roy was an office superintendent of the Cooch Behar Zilla Parishad, based in Bangchatra Road, Cooch Behar. She studied at Kendriya Vidyalaya in Baburhat until 12th class, and went to Delhi afterwards.

She completed her graduation from Miranda House and studied mass communication at Jamia Milia Islamia at her parents' insistence, but left the course midway and went to Mumbai to try her luck in the Hindi film industry. She finished her Part 1 exams and did not return to Delhi after that. Mouni was interested in acting since childhood and has cited actresses Madhubala, Madhuri Dixit and Waheeda Rehman as her acting idols.

== Career ==
=== Debut and initial career (2006–2010) ===
Roy started her career with the Ekta Kapoor drama Kyunki Saas Bhi Kabhi Bahu Thi in 2006, portraying Krishna Tulsi opposite Pulkit Samrat and Akashdeep Saigal. She then participated in, and won, the first season of dancing competition show Zara Nachke Dikha. Then, she portrayed Shivani Sabharwal in Kasturi. In 2008, she participated in Pati Patni Aur Woh. In 2010, Roy played Roop in Do Saheliyaan opposite Jatin Shah.

=== Established television actress (2011–2017) ===
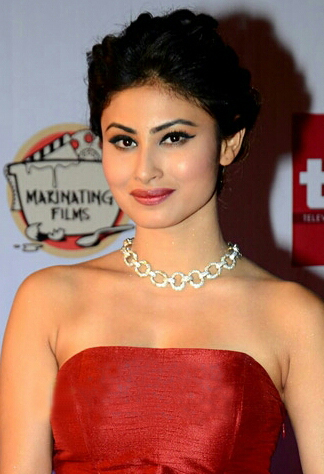
Roy at an event in 2016

In 2011, Roy starred in the Punjabi film Hero Hitler in Love. She attained fame after portraying Sati in Life OK's mythological series Devon Ke Dev...Mahadev, opposite Mohit Raina, from 2011 to 2014. In 2013, she played the lead as Meera, opposite Aditya Redij, in Life OK's Junoon – Aisi Nafrat Toh Kaisa Ishq. In 2014, Roy participated in the dance reality show Jhalak Dikhhla Jaa 7 along with Punit Pathak, and she finished in fourth place.

In 2015, Roy returned to television with Ekta Kapoor's supernatural series Naagin, portraying Shivanya opposite Arjun Bijlani. The series topped the TRP charts, making her a household name not only in India but in other countries as well. She became one of the players on Bijlani's team the Mumbai Tigers in Box Cricket League. She hosted the dance show So You Think You Can Dance on &TV.

In 2017, Roy portrayed a dual role in the second season of Naagin, opposite Karanvir Bohra. Her chemistry with Bijlani in season 1, and with Bohra in season 2, was highly appreciated by audiences, and established her as a leading actress in Indian television. In 2016, Roy voiced the role of Sita in the animated film Mahayoddha Rama. In the same year, she appeared in the song "Nachna Aunda Ni" in Tum Bin 2.

=== Return to Hindi cinema and progression (2018–2022) ===
Roy made her full-fledged Hindi film debut alongside Akshay Kumar as a housewife in Reema Kagti's 2018 period sports film Gold, an Excel Entertainment production revolving around India's struggle for recognition in the Hockey Olympics. Jyoti Sharma Bawa of Hindustan Times noted, "Roy as Akshay's wife Monobina is just the right mixture of crotchety and charming. With her grasp of Bengali, she brings that extra something to the film's milieu." Devesh Sharma of Filmfare stated: "Mouni infuses the film with a dash of sensuality and her stern wife's role adds a bit of a comic touch as well." With global earnings of ₹1.5 billion, Gold emerged as a commercial success. Roy followed the success of Gold with an item number called "Gali Gali" in the Hindi version of K.G.F: Chapter 1, presented by Gold producers Ritesh Sidhwani and Farhan Akhtar.

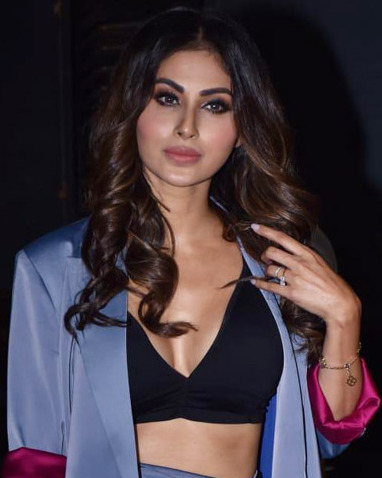
Roy in 2020

In 2019, Roy made a cameo appearance in the final few episodes of Naagin 3 as Mahanaagrani Shivangi. Roy's first release in 2019 was Romeo Akbar Walter alongside John Abraham and Jackie Shroff. For her performance as a RAW agent, Bollywood Hungama wrote, "Mouni Roy has an interesting part to essay. Though she does well, her character gets a raw deal." Romeo Akbar Walter underperformed at the box office. In her next film the same year, Made in China, Roy played a disturbed housewife alongside Rajkummar Rao. Vibha Maru noted: "Mouni is a surprise package. Though given a small role, she comes with much power, owning every bit of the screen time she gets." Made in China proved to be a modest commercial success.

Roy played a pregnant RAW agent in her first OTT feature film, London Confidential. Joginder Tuteja from Rediff.com stated, "Mouni Roy shows conviction in playing her part and is in a different avatar from her earlier performances." In 2021, she played an actress in Velle alongside Abhay Deol. Hiren Kotwani of Times of India wrote, "Mouni has limited scope to perform. Nonetheless, she lights up the screen every time she appears in the film." Roy appeared as the judge in Dance India Dance Li'l Masters 5 in 2022.

The same year, Roy played the main antagonist Junoon in Brahmāstra: Part One – Shiva. Roy received rave reviews from critics and audience alike. Tushar Joshi of India Today noted, "Roy as the villain is terrific and breaks the Naagin stigma with this career-altering performance." Prateek Sur from News18 wrote, "The real find of the film, Roy is simply terrific and really holds herself in this elaborate cast and effortlessly shines as the nemesis." The film became the highest-grossing Hindi film of 2022. Her performance in the film earned her the IIFA Award for Best Supporting Actress and a nomination for the Filmfare Award for Best Supporting Actress.

=== Further work and streaming projects (2023–present) ===
In 2023, Roy made her web debut with Milan Luthria's Sultan of Delhi opposite Tahir Raj Bhasin and Anjum Sharma. She played a cabaret dancer, Nayanthara in the series. Saibal Chatterjee stated that the script doesn't allow her to perform.

In her first release of 2024, Roy played Yasmine Ali, an actress opposite Emraan Hashmi in the series Showtime. Writing for Hindustan Times, Devansh Sharma stated, "Mouni does get some moments to shine, especially a close-up shot where reel life echoes the real, but her arc is strictly work-in-progress." Later the year, she appeared as a TV host in Love Sex Aur Dhokha 2. Ganesh Aaglave of Firstpost was appreciative of her cameo. She then played Shruti, a woman-on-the-run alongside Vikrant Massey in Blackout. The film received negative reviews and Sukanya Verma opined that Roy's character was "reduced to chumps".

In 2025, Roy first played a ghost in The Bhootnii opposite Sunny Singh. Rishabh Suri stated that she "fares well" in her role due to her experience with such supernatural roles. Following this, she played an Indian undercover agent in Pakistan in the series Salakaar alongside Naveen Kasturia. Vinamra Mathur was appreciative of her "nuanced character" and performance. Varun Dhawan starrer Hai Jawani Toh Ishq Hona Hai where she played mother's role of Varun Dhawan.

== Personal life ==
Roy has been awarded the UAE Golden Visa, attributed to her frequent visits to the country. On 27 January 2022, she married Dubai-based Malayali businessman Suraj Nambiar in traditional Bengali and Malayali ceremonies in Panaji, Goa, following a three-year relationship. They divorced in 2026.

== Other work and media image ==
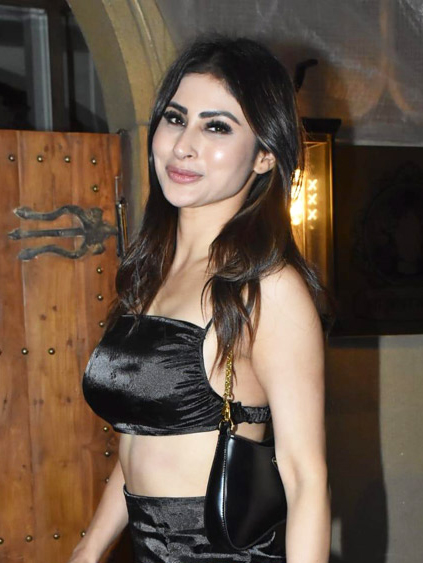
Roy in 2023

Roy has established herself as one of the most prominent television actresses in India. Times of India labelled Naagin a "game-changer" for Roy. After the release of Brahmāstra: Part One – Shiva, Mayukh Majumdar of Filmfare termed her "the undisputed star of the film". Financial Express stated that Roy's Junoon will be the "best antagonist Bollywood has seen in a while". Roy has frequently featured on Times of India's "50 Most Desirable Women" list. She ranked 35th in 2017, 32nd in 2018, 41st in 2019 and 44th in 2020. She placed 3rd in the same publication's "20 Most Desirable Women on TV" list in 2017. In 2018, same publication also ranked her 4th in the Top 10 Popular Actress in Television. In 2023, she ranked 8th in Times Now "Popular Actresses" list.

Roy is a prominent celebrity endorser for brands and products including Bryan & Candy, Joy and Spawake. In March 2023, Roy performed in various cities in the United States for "The Entertainers" tour, alongside Akshay Kumar, Disha Patani, Nora Fatehi, Sonam Bajwa, Aparshakti Khurana, Stebin Ben and Zahrah S Khan. Roy also supports a number of social causes. During the COVID-19 crisis, she donated a sum for people in need. In 2020, after the cyclone Amphan, she joined with an NGO and auctioned her paintings in order to raise funds for victims. Roy also donated to the Iskcon Foundation for medical facilities in Mayapur in 2021. Roy and her husband Suraj Nambiar launched "Ultimate Gurus", a global education platform, in 2022. In May 2023, Roy opened a restaurant named "Badmaash" in Mumbai. Roy is the most-followed Indian television actresses in Instagram.

== Filmography ==
Key
†	Denotes films that have not yet been released

=== Films ===
- All films are in Hindi unless otherwise noted.

Year	Title	Role	Notes	Ref.
2004	Run	Dancer	in song "Nahin Hona Nahin Hona"	
2011	Hero Hitler in Love	Sahiban	Punjabi film	
2016	Mahayoddha Rama	Sita	Animated film; Voice only	
2016	Tum Bin 2	Herself	Special appearance in song "Nachna Aaonda Nahin"	
2018	Gold	Monobina Das		
2018	KGF: Chapter 1	Lucy	Kannada film; Special appearance in song "Gali Gali"	
2019	Romeo Akbar Walter	Shraddha Sharma / Parul		
2019	Made in China	Rukmini Mehta		
2020	London Confidential	Uma Kulkarni		
2021	Velle	Rohini Roy		
2022	Brahmāstra: Part One – Shiva	Junoon		
2024	Love Sex Aur Dhokha 2	Soni	Cameo appearance	
2024	Blackout	Shruti Mehra		
2024	Vedaa	Herself	Special appearance in song "Mummy Ji"	
2025	The Bhootnii	Mohabbat		
2026	Hai Jawani Toh Ishq Hona Hai	Rasmalai		
2026	Vishwambhara †	TBA	Telugu film; Special appearance; Post-production	
TBA	The Wives †	TBA	Filming	
TBA	Teesvi Manzil †	TBA	Completed	

=== Television ===
Year	Title	Role	Notes	Ref.
2006–2008	Kyunki Saas Bhi Kabhi Bahu Thi	Krishna Tulsi		
2008	Kaho Na Yaar Hai	Contestant	Episode 5	
2008	Kasturi	Shivani Sabbarwal		
2008	Zara Nachke Dikha 1	Contestant	Winner	
2009	Pati Patni Aur Woh	Contestant		
2010	Do Saheliyaan	Roop		
2010	Sshhh... Phir Koi Hai- Trittya	Koena		
2011–2014	Devon Ke Dev...Mahadev	Sati	Main role	
2012–2013	Junoon – Aisi Nafrat Toh Kaisa Ishq	Meera	Main role	
2014	Jhalak Dikhhla Jaa 7	Contestant	4th place	
2015–2016	Naagin 1	Shivanya Singh	Main role	
2016–2017	Naagin 2	Shivangi Pratap Singh / Shivanya Singh	Main role	
2018; 2019	Naagin 3	Shivangi Pratap Singh / Shivanya Singh	Extended Cameo	
2018	Lip Sing Battle	Contestant		
2022	Dance India Dance Li'l Masters 5	Judge		
2023	Dance Bangla Dance 12	Judge		
2023	Temptation Island India	Host		
2023	Sultan of Delhi	Nayantara Gangopadhya		
2024	Showtime	Yasmine Ali		
2025	Salakaar	Srishti Chaturvedi / Mariam		

=== Music videos ===
Year	Title	Singer(s)	Ref.
2020	Holi Mein Rangeele	Mika Singh, Abhinav Shekhar	
2020	Bheegi Bheegi Raaton Mein	Nakash Aziz, Mouni Roy	
2021	Patli Kamariya	Tanishk Bagchi, Sukhe, Parampara Tandon	
2021	Baithe Baithe	Stebin Ben, Danish Sabri, Aishwarya Pandit	
2021	Disco Balma	Asees Kaur, Mellow D	
2021	Dil Galti Kar Baitha Hai	Jubin Nautiyal	
2021	Jodaa	Afsana Khan	
2022	Poori Gal Baat	Tiger Shroff	
2022	Gatividhi	Yo Yo Honey Singh	
2022	Fakeeran	Zahrah S Khan	
2023	Dotara	Payal Dev, Jubin Nautiyal	
2024	Love Ya	Diljit Dosanjh	
2024	Zaalima	Shreya Ghoshal, Dystinct	

== Accolades ==
Roy has received two Filmfare Awards nominations: Best Female Debut for Gold and Best Supporting Actress for Brahmāstra: Part One – Shiva. Roy also won the ITA Award for Best Actress Popular for Naagin.

Year	Award	Category	Work	Result	Ref.
2006	6th Indian Telly Awards	Fresh New Face – Female	Kyunki Saas Bhi Kabhi Bahu Thi	Won	
2016	16th Indian Television Academy Awards	Best Actress – Popular	Naagin	Won	
2016	10th Gold Awards	Best Actress in a Lead Role	Naagin	Won	
2016	BIG Star Entertainment Awards	Most Entertaining Television Actress	Naagin	Won	
2017	11th Gold Awards	Best Actress in a Lead Role (Jury)	Naagin 2	Won	
2017	11th Gold Awards	Face of the Year – Female	Naagin 2	Won	
2017	17th Indian Television Academy Awards	Best Actress – Popular	Naagin 2	Nominated	
2018	64th Filmfare Awards	Best Female Debut	Gold	Nominated	
2018	Star Screen Awards	Best Ethnic Style (Female)	Gold	Won	
2018	12th Gold Awards	Rising Film Star From Television	—N/a	Won	
2019	Zee Cine Awards	Best Female Debut	Gold	Nominated	
2019	ETC Bollywood Business Awards	Highest Grossing Female Debut	Gold	Won	
2023	Bollywood Hungama Style Icons	Most Stylish Mould Breaking Star (Female)	—N/a	Nominated	
2023	Bollywood Hungama Style Icons	Most Stylish Haute Stepper	—N/a	Won	
2023	Pinkvilla Style Icons Awards	Mould-Breaker – Female	—N/a	Won	
2023	68th Filmfare Awards	Best Supporting Actress	Brahmāstra: Part One – Shiva	Nominated	
2023	23rd IIFA Awards	Best Supporting Actress	Brahmāstra: Part One – Shiva	Won	
