= Uttar Da Puttar =

2026 Indian film

Uttar da Puttar
- Directed by: Ravinder Siwach
- Screenplay by: Ritesh Shah
- Story by: Ravinder Siwach; Sandip Kapur
- Produced by: Sandip Kapur; Priya Kapur
- Starring: Annu Kapoor; Rukhsar Rehman; Brijendra Kala; Pavan Malhotra; Ishtiyak Khan; Rajendra Sethi; Sumit Gulati; Nitin Arora; Jeeveshu Ahluwalia
- Production company: Promodome Motion Pictures
- Release date: 24 July 2026
- Running time: 103 minutes
- Country: India
- Language: Hindi

Uttar da Puttar is an Indian Hindi comedy social satire film, starring Annu Kapoor along with Rukhsar Rehman, Brijendra Kala, Pavan Malhotra, Ishtiyak Khan and Jeeveshu Ahluwalia. The movie is directed by Ravinder Siwach.

== Plot ==
The movie explores various Indian faith values like Vastu, Jyotishi (astrology), and Ank Vidya (numerology). It discusses the ill impacts of superstition and superstitious beliefs.

== Cast ==
- Annu Kapoor as Professor
- Rukhsar Rehman as Ginni
- Brijendra Kala
- Pavan Malhotra
- Ishtiyak Khan
- Rajendra Sethi
- Sumit Gulati
- Nitin Arora
- Jeeveshu Ahluwalia
