= Allah Ke Banday =

- Official poster
- Directed by: Faruk Kabir
- Written by: Faruk Kabir
- Produced by: Ravi Walia
- Starring: Naseeruddin Shah; Sharman Joshi; Faruk Kabir; Atul Kulkarni
- Cinematography: Vishal Sinha
- Edited by: Sandeep Francis
- Music by: Kailash Kher; Chirantan Bhatt; Hamza Faruqui
- Distributed by: Rising Star Entertainment; Percept Picture Company
- Release date: 26 November 2010
- Country: India
- Language: Hindi
- Budget: ₹ 5 crore

Allah Ke Banday (transl. People of God) is a 2010 Indian Hindi-language crime drama film produced by Ravi Walia and directed by Faruk Kabir.

== Plot ==
Allah Ke Banday tells the tale of two 12-year-old boys (Vijay and Yakub) who grow up in the slums of India. Wanting to make a name for themselves in the mafia world, they start delivering drugs. Their friend (Zakir Hussain) dresses as a transgender, in an act where they loot people. Things go wrong when they are sent to a juvenile reformatory after being wrongly convicted for a murder. They learn life is much tougher in the reformatory than the world they came from. They are tortured by the warden and senior inmates. But instead of reforming they develop a more sinister plan in their quest for ultimate power.

== Cast ==
- Sharman Joshi as Vijay Kamble
- Faruk Kabir as Yakub
- Naseeruddin Shah as Warden
- Atul Kulkarni as Ashwani
- Anjana Sukhani as Sandhya
- Rukhsar Rehman as Nirmala
- Zakir Hussain as Ramesh
- Saksham Kulkarni as Vitthal
- Ajaz Khan as Nana chauhan
- Suhasini Mulay as Mother
- Vikram Gokhale as Sheryaar
- Madan Deodhar as Vijay Kamble (childhood)
- Varun Bhagwat

== Soundtrack ==
Track #	Song	Singer(s)	Duration
1	"Kaala Jaadu"	Ishq Bector	03:11
2	"Kya Hawa Kya Baadal"	Kailash Kher	03:33
3	"Kya Hawa Kya Baadal"	Kailash Kher	07:07
4	"Maula"	Hamza Faruqui & Krishna	03:33
5	"Mayoos"	Sunidhi Chauhan	04:12
6	"Rabba Rabb"	Ravi Khote	01:59

== Accolades ==
Award Ceremony	Category	Recipient	Result	Ref.(s)
3rd Mirchi Music Awards	Upcoming Music Composer of The Year	Tarun and Vinayak - "Rabba Rabba"	Nominated	
