= Kusumi =

Kusumi (written: 楠見, 楠美, 久住, 久隅 or 久須美) is a Japanese surname. Notable people with the surname include:

- Akihiro Kusumi (楠見 明弘), Japanese biologist
- Keishi Kusumi (楠美 圭史, born 1994), Japanese footballer
- Kenro Kusumi (久住, born 1967), American professor
- Kin'ichi Kusumi (久須美 欽一, born 1950), Japanese actor
- Koharu Kusumi (久住 小春, born 1992), Japanese idol, singer, model, actress, voice actress and television personality
- Kusumi Morikage (久隅 守景, c. 1620 – 1690), Japanese painter
- Naoki Kusumi (久住 有生, born 1972), Japanese artist
- Naomi Kusumi (楠見 尚己, born 1954), Japanese voice actor
