= Salakaar =

Indian TV series

- Genre: Action,Espionage,Thriller
- Written by: Faruk Kabir, Spandan Mishra, Srinivas Abrol,Swati Tripathi
- Directed by: Faruk Kabir
- Starring: Naveen Kasturia; Mouni Roy; Mukesh Rishi
- Theme music composer: Amar Mohile
- Country of origin: India
- Original language: Hindi
- No. of seasons: 1
- No. of episodes: 5

Production
- Producer: Surag Brahmbhatt
- Cinematography: Jitan Harmeet Singh
- Editor: Sandeep Francis
- Running time: 27–39 min
- Production companies: Sphere Origins, Mahir Films

Original release
- Network: JioHotstar
- Release: 8 August 2025 – present

Salakaar is an Indian Hindi-language action espionage thriller series created and directed by Faruk Kabir starring Naveen Kasturia, Mouni Roy, Mukesh Rishi, Purnendu Bhattacharya, Ashwath Bhatt, and Surya Sharma. It was released as JioHotstar-original on 8 August 2025.

== Cast ==
- Naveen Kasturia as young Adhir Dayal
  - Purnendu Bhattacharya as NSA Adhir Dayal
- Mouni Roy as Mariam / Srishti Chaturvedi
- Mukesh Rishi as Zia-ul-Haq
- Surya Sharma as Colonel Ashfaq Ulla
  - Hassan Syed as young Ashfaq
- Ashwath Bhatt as Mohseen Alam
- Janhavi Hardas as Jyoti Chaturvedi

== Release ==
Salakaar was released on 10 August 2025 at JioHotstar.

== Review ==
Writing review for India Today, Shweta Keshri raised the concern of logic in the script, and wrote "For instance, a dramatic explosion at the nuclear plant leaves Dayal with just a few scratches. Security in a high-alert zone like Kahuta seems inconsistent. Dayal faced a lot of scrutiny while entering the territory, but how did he return and then come back again?" Shubhra Gupta for The Indian Express stated the series is a cringe. Reviewing for The Free Press Journal, critic Troy Ribeiro wrote, "While the series flirts with rewriting history (or veers into patriotic fan fiction), Salakaar leaves you wondering—does it stir pride or resurface old wounds? Either way, it’s audacious—and in the world of espionage, audacity counts." Nandini Ramnath of Scroll.in wrote "Salakaar claims to be inspired by actual events. But the show is too dumbed-down, amateurish and contrived to be credible. The five-episode series doesn’t give any real sense of how espionage is conducted or how officials and leaders in both countries behave." Rahul Desai for The Hollywood Reporter India stated "sounds like a great show - a long-form Raazi perfaps." Vinamra Mathur of Firstpost praised performance of Mouni Roy and Mukesh Rishi. Nonika Singh for The Tribune wrote "Much of the India-Pakistan action does not rouse patriotic sentiments, nor is it adrenaline pumping." Chirag Sehgal for News18 stated "The show’s dialogues are another major letdown, often feeling forced and unnatural."
