= Hero Hitler in Love =

2011 Indian romantic/action film

- Film poster
- Directed by: Sukhwant Dhadda
- Screenplay by: Babbu Maan
- Story by: Babbu Maan
- Based on: Mirza Sahiban
- Produced by: Babu Singh Maan (Maan Films); Darshan Grewal
- Starring: Babbu Maan; Mouni Roy; Bhagwant Maan; Happy
- Edited by: Sanjay Verma
- Music by: Babbu Maan
- Production company: Maan films
- Distributed by: Maan Films
- Release date: 18 November 2011
- Running time: 118 minutes
- Country: India
- Language: Punjabi

Hero Hitler in Love is a 2011 Indian Punjabi-language romantic and action film directed by Sukhwant Dhadda and written by Babbu Maan. The Maan Films production stars Babbu Maan, Mouni Roy and Bhagwant Maan in lead roles. It is loosely based on the folktale of Mirza Sahiban and released on 18 November 2011.

== Plot ==
Hero Hitler in Love revolves around the life of a man called Hitler who lives in his village, Ishkapur, in India. Hitler is a man with unique and different thoughts, who loves his fellow villagers and helps soul-mates come together. Hitler falls in love with Sahiban, who lives in Pakistan and decides to bring her to his village. Hitler believes in solving problems by talking about them, but when something crosses the line, he loses it. The film also revolves around car racing. Hitler loves to race, but when he is set up to fail in the Asian Car Racing competition he decides to take revenge. The story relates how Hitler takes his revenge and fights for Sahiban, in the process helping to calm the tension between the competing nations of India and Pakistan.

== Cast ==
- Babbu Maan as Hitler/Mirza
- Mouni Roy as Sahiban
- Bhagwant Maan as Shameem
- Happy Gosal as Villain
- Surinder Rehal as Villain's Father
- Sukhwant Dhadda as Heroin's Father
- Madhuri Bhattacharya in Mujra number Shabab
- Chacha as Our Real Chacha
- Jinder as Kabootarbaaz
- Sarbjit Maan as Lambar Amli
- Tony as Press Reporter
- Nagender as Pandit Sanyasi Manji singh
- Raavi Bal as Pind Da Ranjha
- Ram Singh as Rana Cyclelan Wala
- Bala Krishan as Nek Bakriyan Wala

== Soundtrack ==
Hero Hitler in Love

Soundtrack album by Babbu Maan
- Released: 28 November 2011
- Genre: Feature film soundtrack
- Length: 52:42
- Label: Point Zero

All lyrics are written by Babbu Maan; all music is composed by Babbu Maan.

Tracklist
No.	Title	Lyrics	Music	Singer(s)	Length
1.	"Sher"	Babbu Maan	Babbu Maan	Babbu Maan	05:02
2.	"Heer"	Babbu Maan	Babbu Maan	Babbu Maan, Sadhana Sargam	06:01
3.	"Supney"	Babbu Maan	Babbu Maan	Babbu Maan	06:15
4.	"Shabab"	Babbu Maan	Babbu Maan	Babbu Maan	06:10
5.	"Jatt Marjuga"	Babbu Maan	Babbu Maan	Babbu Maan	04:41
6.	"Chardi Jawani"	Babbu Maan	Babbu Maan	Babbu Maan	07:17
7.	"Rabb Mil Jawe"	Babbu Maan	Babbu Maan	Babbu Maan, Sadhana Sargam	04:49
8.	"Mirza"	Babbu Maan	Babbu Maan	Babbu Maan, Neetu Bhalla	08:32
9.	"Hitler"	Babbu Maan	Babbu Maan	Babbu Maan	04:50
Total length:					52:42
