= The Awakening (2006 film) =

2006 Indian short film by Faruk Kabir

- Directed by: Faruk Kabir
- Written by: Faruk Kabir
- Produced by: Ajay Devgn; Kumar Mangat Pathak
- Starring: Ajay Devgn; Anjaan Ali
- Edited by: Ajay Devgn
- Distributed by: Big Screen Entertainer
- Release date: 28 July 2006
- Country: India
- Language: Hindi

The Awakening is a 2006 Bollywood documentary short film produced by Ajay Devgn and Kumar Mangat Pathak and directed by Faruk Kabir.

== Plot ==
The film has an interaction between Ajay Devgn and a small kid who lost his parents in the Mumbai floods on 26 July 2005. Ajay Devgan then shares his own bad experience on that day.

== Cast ==
- Ajay Devgn
- Anjaan Ali
