= Yaad Rakhegi Duniya =

- Movie Poster
- Directed by: Deepak Anand
- Written by: Anees Bazmee
- Story by: Mani Ratnam
- Based on: Geethanjali (Telugu)
- Produced by: Nandu G. Tolani
- Starring: Aditya Pancholi; Rukhsar Rehman
- Cinematography: Manmohan Singh
- Edited by: Deepak Anand
- Music by: Anand–Milind
- Distributed by: Paras Films International
- Release date: 10 January 1992
- Country: India
- Language: Hindi

Yaad Rakhegi Duniya (transl. The world will remember) is a 1992 Indian romantic drama film directed by Deepak Anand on his debut. It stars Aditya Pancholi, and Rukhsar Rehman in the lead roles. It is a remake of the Telugu film Geethanjali (1989), directed by Mani Ratnam.

== Plot ==
Vicky Anand has just graduated from college with honors and decides to celebrate. An accident leads him to the hospital and the shocking discovery that he's suffering from a terminal illness. He decides to move to the lush, green locales of Ooty, a hill-station hoping to find peace and solitude, where he meets Naina, a precocious young woman who enjoys playing pranks. Vicky finds support and encouragement befriending her and eventually falls in love with the mischievous and outgoing Naina, who also has a terminal illness. Vicky learns of Naina's illness, and discusses this with her father, who is a doctor, who confirms it, saying that there is no cure. Despite this, Vicky wants to marry her. When Vicky's mother comes to visit her son, he tells her about his love for Naina, and she is delighted. She rushes over to meet Naina for the first time, and is pleased with Vicky's choice. Then unknowingly she blurts out a truth so devastating, that it will change Naina's final remaining days forever.

== Cast ==
- Aditya Pancholi as Vicky Anand
- Rukhsar Rehman as Naina
- Tinu Anand as Shikari
- Vikram Gokhale as Doctor
- Arun Bakshi as Mr. Anand
- Anjana Mumtaz as Mrs. Anand
- Yunus Parvez as Shikari's Advisor
- Dina Pathak as Naina's Grandmother

== Music ==
The music was composed by Anand–Milind, while Sameer wrote the lyrics.

Song	Singer
"Ae Hawa Aake"	Anuradha Paudwal
"Tujhe Rab Ne Banaya Kis Liye, Kis Liye"	Mohammed Aziz, Sadhana Sargam
"Tooti Khidki, Makdi Ka Jangla"	Kavita Krishnamurthy, Amit Kumar
"Gali Gali Mein Gana"	Amit Kumar
"Naina O Meri Naina"	Amit Kumar
