= Desi Romeos =

- Directed by: Shafaq Khan
- Written by: Babbu Maan
- Starring: Babbu Maan; Harjit Harman; Shilpa Dhar; Raavi Bal; Bhupinder Gill; Jasprem Dhillon
- Music by: Babbu Maan
- Distributed by: Maan Films
- Release date: 15 June 2012
- Country: India
- Language: Punjabi

Desi Romeos is a 2012 Punjabi film produced by Babbu Maan, starring Babbu Maan and Harjit Harman in lead roles.

== Cast ==
- Babbu Maan - Randhawa
- Harjit Harman - Sandhu
- Shilpa Dhar - Urmilla
- Jasneer Kaur - Lali
- Bhupinder Gill - DJ Jaggadi
- Bittu - Om
- Mitesh - Oshu
- Jasprem Dhillon - Mirza
- Raavi Bal - Ehsaaz
- Sherry Uppal - Manna

== Plot ==
Desi Romeos is the story of six boys who are popular in college for their music which leads to jealousy of Mirza group. Desi Romeos is also the story of their journey from the days of the hostel to house no. 55, where they stay on rent and where romance blossoms between them and the girls staying as PG in the house opposite them to the jail. Those who called upon by people as good for nothing, achieve success through their musical talent. 'Desi Romeos' contains much action, romance and music.

== Music ==
Music was released on 25 May.

Track Listings

1. "Kabootri" (Remix)
2. "Output Zero"
3. "Sohaniyan"
4. "Sardari"
5. "Chandigarh"
6. "Mutiyar"
7. "Why Don't You"
8. "Kabootri"
