= Benny and Babloo =

- Official Movie Poster
- Directed by: Yunus Sajawal
- Written by: Story and Screenplay: Yunus Sajawal; Dialogues: Farhad-Sajid
- Produced by: Umesh Chouhan & Bablu Uddin
- Starring: Kay Kay Menon; Rajpal Yadav; Riya Sen; Shweta Tiwari; Rukhsar Rehman; Anita Hassanandani; Richa Chadda; Maushumi Udeshi; Hiten Paintal; Aashif Sheikh
- Music by: Amjad Nadeem
- Release date: 1 October 2010
- Country: India
- Language: Hindi

Benny and Babloo is a 2010 Bollywood satirical comedy film, produced by Umesh Chouhan and directed by noted screenwriter Yunus Sajawal. The film was released in October 2010 under the Chamunda Films banner. The film stars Kay Kay Menon, Rajpal Yadav, Riya Sen, Shweta Tiwari, Rukhsar Rehman, Anita Hassanandani, Richa Chadda, Maushumi Udeshi, Hiten Paintal and Aasif Sheikh in prominent roles.

== Plot ==
Smitten by the glamour of Mumbai, two friends, Benny and Babloo, land up in distinctly different jobs: Benny as the bellboy of a five-star hotel, and Babloo as a waiter in a ladies' service bar.

Benny believes his job is better than Babloo's and repeatedly ridicules him. Benny's pride fades away as they both realize that, although their jobs may look different viewed from the outside, they're quite similar seen from the inside.

Benny witnesses several criminal activities at the hotel, from drug abuse to political scandals, while Babloo sees the human side of the ladies' bar. In the end, the truth stares them in the face: five-star hotels are the moral juniors to ladies' bars.

== Cast ==
- Shweta Tiwari as Sheena
- Kay Kay Menon as Benny Kutti
- Rajpal Yadav as Babloo Charan Lathi
- Aasif Sheikh as Negi
- Riya Sen as Riya
- Kishori Shahane as Mrs. Tejwani
- Hussain Sheikh as Raju - Bar Owner
- Hiten Paintal as Ronnie
- Rukhsar Rehman as Hema / Parveen
- Anita Hassanandani as Esha / Sarita
- Kiran Janjani as Ranveer
- Richa Chadha as Fedora / Marina
- Anangsha Biswas as Sony / Akruti
- Anant Jog as Ratnath Gaikwad
- Maushmi Udeshi as Dancer
- Ravi Pandey as DJ Roger

== Music ==
1. "Jabse Dil Diya Hai" - Himani Kapoor, Sukhwinder Singh
2. "Dolly" - Kalpana Patowary, Master Saleem

== Reception ==
Taran Adarsh of Bollywood Hungama gave the film 2 out of 5, writing, "BENNY AND BABLOO may not be path breaking or innovative as such, but it keeps you hooked in most parts, especially the finale." Renuka Rao of Daily News and Analysis wrote, "All in all, the film is an average attempt at highlighting a well-known social issue. It is not good enough to charm you."
