= Nexus Elante Mall =

Elante Mall

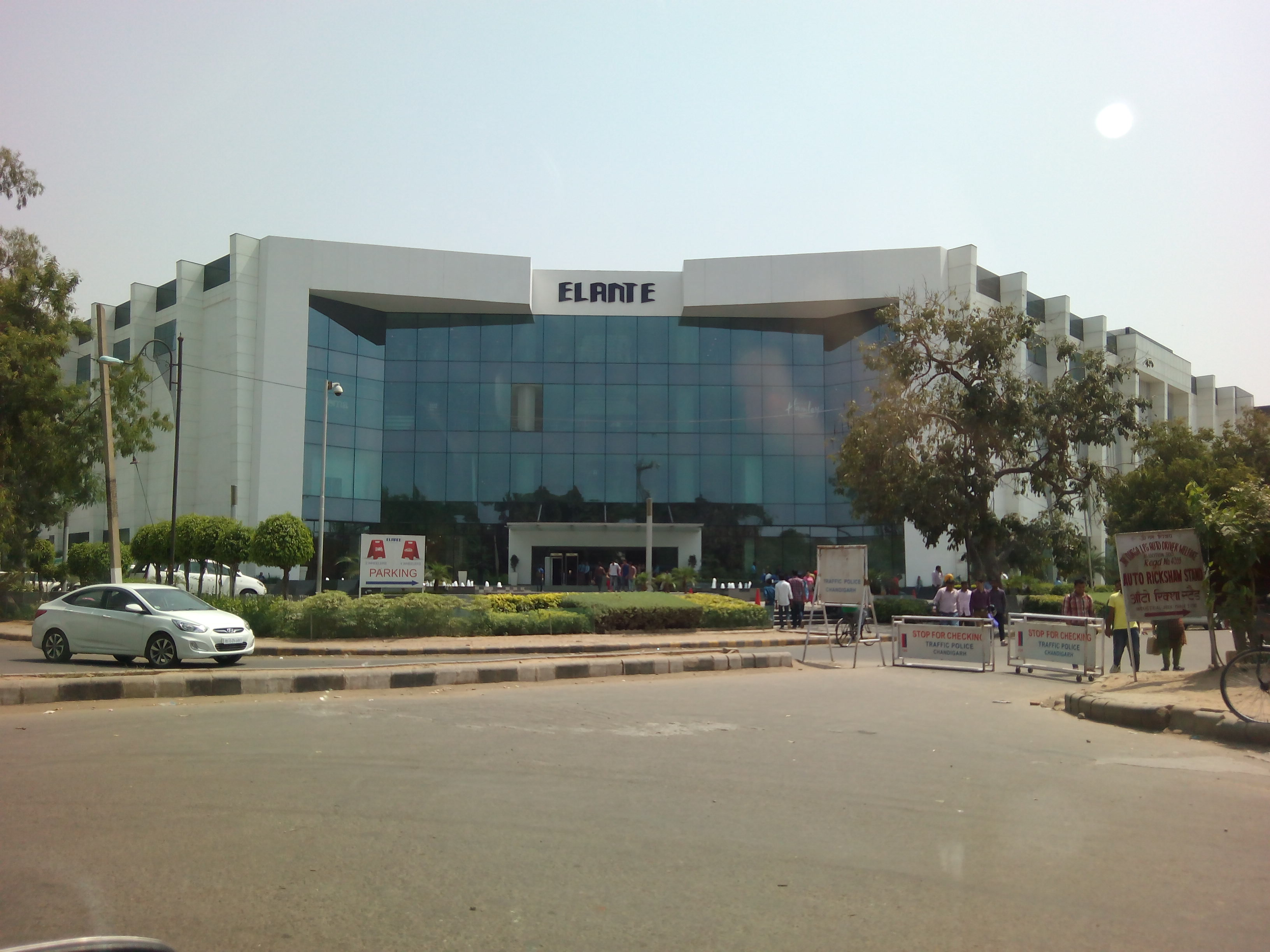
- Main entrance of the Mall
- Location: Chandigarh, India
- Coordinates: 30.706°N 76.801°E
- Address: 178, Industrial Area, Phase 1
- Opened: April 2013
- Developer: L&T Realty
- Owner: Nexus Select Trust
- Num. of stores: 300
- Floor area: 1,150,000 sq ft (107,000 m^{2})
- Floors: 4 + 1 basement level, of retail area
- Parking: Multilevel
- Website: www.nexusselecttrust.com/nexus-elante

Nexus Elante Mall is a shopping mall in Chandigarh, India. With a gross leasable area of 1,000,000 sq ft (93,000 m^{2}), it is the 7th largest shopping mall in Northern India and the 10th largest in India. Elante is spread over an area of 20 acres. It is part of a mixed-use real estate development project by Larsen & Toubro and has been bought by Nexus Select Trust, now called Nexus Elante Mall.

== Features ==
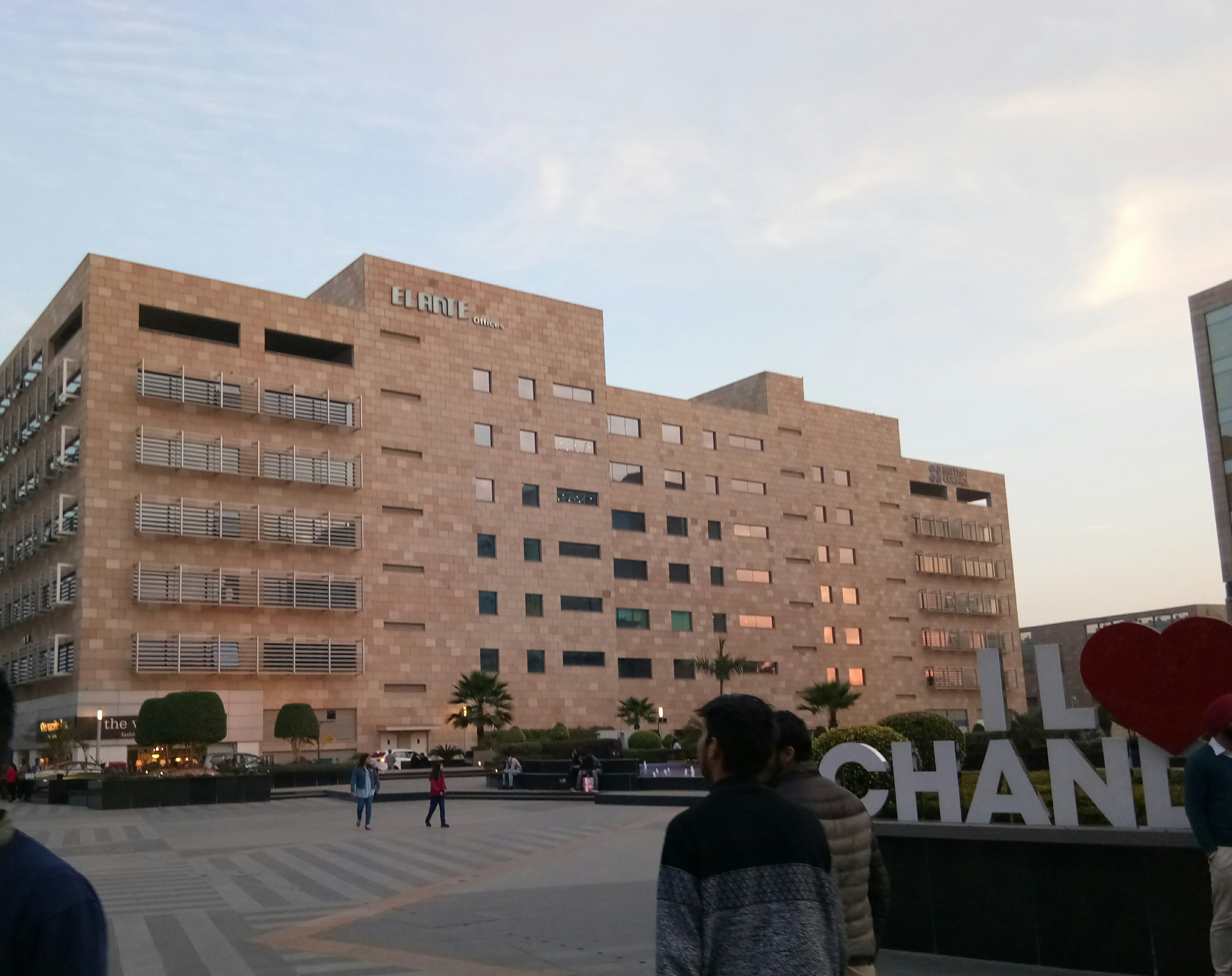
Offices Building of Elante Mall

Nexus Elante Mall has a retail space area of over 1 million square feet. It has 2 main gates, one is on the big front entry, and another one is on the back. It has 3 basement levels, a ground level, and three upper levels. In the retail area, Nexus Elante Mall hosts retailers of various Indian and international brands, a food court, and a courtyard full of cafes. The Mall has an 8-screen Multiplex of PVR Cinemas. On its top floor, the mall has restaurants, fast food joints, and a Fun City for kids' entertainment. In 2013, the mall was found to be burning 6000 litres of diesel daily due to a lack of electricity connection to the grid. The mall requires a 15 MW power supply.

== Acquisition deals ==
In September 2015, Mumbai-based Carnival Group bought Elante Mall at a price of ₹1,785 crore (US$190 million), making it one of the biggest deals for a single piece of real estate or property in India at the time.

On 28 July 2017, Nexus Malls, a subsidiary of US-based global investment firm The Blackstone Group bought Elante Mall for an undisclosed amount. This is the second time Elante Mall is sold in two years.

== See also ==
- Larsen & Toubro
