= Babbu Maan =

Indian singer

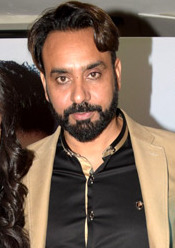
- Maan launching "Baarish Ke Bahaane"

Background information
- Born: Tejinder Singh Maan; 29 March 1975 (age 51); Khant Maanpur, Punjab, India
- Genres: Folk, Bhangra, pop, ghazals
- Occupations: Singer; lyricist; music director; actor; producer; screenwriter
- Years active: 1997–present
- Labels: Catrack, T-Series, Point Zero, Eros International, Swag Music, Speed Records, Zee Music Company, Sony Music
- Website: babbumaan.net

Tejinder Singh "Babbu" Maan (born 29 March 1975) is an Indian singer-songwriter, music director, actor and film producer primarily associated with the Punjabi music and cinema.

== Early life ==
Maan was born as Tejinder Maan on in the village of Khant Maanpur in the Fatehgarh Sahib district of Punjab on 29 March 1975.

== Career ==
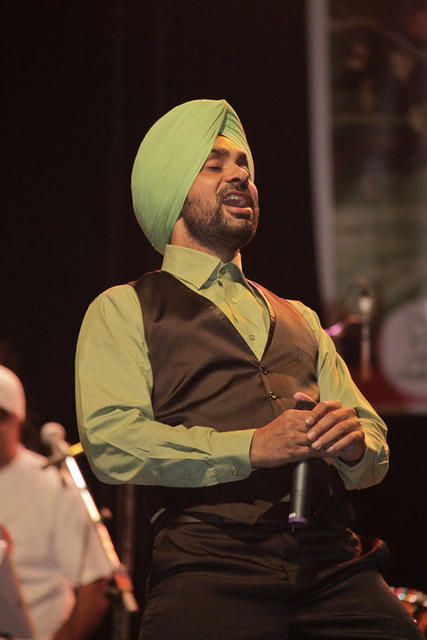
Maan performing live in 2010

Maan's main target audience is the Punjabi-speaking population of the world. Since 1999, he has released eight studio albums and six compilation albums; has written screenplays for, acted in and produced Punjabi films; and has contributed significantly to regional and Bollywood film soundtracks. Maan is the ambassador for One Hope, One Chance, a non-profit organisation based out of Punjab.

=== Music ===
Babbu Maan recorded his first album Sajjan Rumaal De Geya in 1997 but revised and re-released most of the songs in his subsequent albums. Maan's first official debut album Tu Meri Miss India was released in 1999.

In 2001, Babbu Maan released his third album Saaun Di Jhadi, featuring songs such as Chan Chanani, Raat Guzarlayi, Dil Ta Pagal Hai, Ishq, Kabza and Touch Wood, and in 2003, he wrote and sang for his first film soundtrack Hawayein where he worked alongside Indian playback singers Sukhwinder Singh and Jaspinder Narula. Maan released his fourth album Ohi Chann Ohi Rataan in 2004, followed by Pyaas in 2005, one of the best-selling Punjabi albums of the time. In 2007, Maan released his first Hindi album entitled Mera Gham, and in 2009, his first religious album Singh Better Than King. A song from the latter, Baba Nanak, a reaction to fake saints and preachers in Punjab, caused various debates about the growing phenomenon in the state. In 2010 he won "Best International Artist" at the Brit Asia TV Music Awards.

On 4 July 2013, Maan released Talaash: In Search of Soul, his first Punjabi commercial album after eight years. The album entered top 10 in World Albums chart by Billboard. In 2015, the album named Itihaas was released and in 2018 Ik C Pagal was released.

In addition to Hawayein, Babbu Maan has sung in Punjabi films Waagah and Dil Tainu Karda Ae Pyar as well as for Bollywood productions Vaada Raha, Crook, Saheb, Biwi Aur Gangster, Titoo MBA, and 31st October.

Babbu Maan has performed in shows across Asia, Australasia, Europe, North America and the Middle East. In 2014, Maan was a winner of four World Music Awards: World's Best Indian Male Artist, World's Best Indian Live Act, World's Best Indian Entertainer and World's Best Indian Album for Talaash: In Search of Soul.

Maan also won two daf BAMA Music Awards Germany in 2017.

=== Films ===
Babbu Maan debuted in a supporting role in Hawayein, a 2003 film based on the 1984 anti-Sikh riots. Although banned in India, the film was a success overseas. In 2006, Maan starred in his first Punjabi film as the main lead in Rabb Ne Banaiyan Jodiean. Dissatisfied with certain scenes and the fate of the film, Maan returned to form in 2008 with Hashar (A Love Story). He has since written, produced and acted in his own films Ekam, Hero Hitler in Love and Desi Romeos. Babbu Maan is a partner in Maan Films Pvt. Ltd, and in 2010, constructed a film set called Ishqpura in his native village. In 2018, he acted in the film Banjara which is based on the life of truck drivers.

=== Clothing brand ===
Babbu Maan launched his own clothing brand named The Babbu Maan Store, which has more than 20 stores in Punjab, India.

== Discography ==
=== Studio albums ===
Album	Year	Music director	Record label	Lyrics
Sajjan Rumal De Geya	1998	Surinder Bachan	Catrack	Babbu Maan
Tu Meri Miss India	1999	Surinder Bachan	Catrack	Babbu Maan
Saaun Di Jhadi	2001	Jaidev Kumar	T-Series	Babbu Maan
Ohi Chann Ohi Rataan	2004	Babbu Maan	T-Series	Babbu Maan
Pyass: In Search of Destiny	2005	Babbu Maan	T-Series	Babbu Maan
Mera Gham	2007	Babbu Maan	Point Zero	Babbu Maan
Singh Better Than King	2009	Babbu Maan	Point Zero	Babbu Maan
Talaash: In Search Of Soul	2013	Babbu Maan	Swag Music	Babbu Maan
Mera Gham 2	2014	Babbu Maan	Swag Music	Babbu Maan
Itihaas	2015	Babbu Maan	Swag Music	Babbu Maan
Ik C Pagal	2018	Babbu Maan	Swag Music	Babbu Maan
Pagal Shayar	2020	Babbu Maan	Swag Music	Babbu Maan
Singh Better Than King Vol. 2	2020	Babbu Maan	Swag Music	Babbu Maan
Adab Punjabi	2022	Babbu Maan	Swag Music	Babbu Maan

=== Singles ===
Song	Year	Music	Record label	Album
Chor	1997	Babbu Maan		
Lareyan De Naal	1997	Babbu Maan		
Sardar	2008	Babbu Maan	Point Zero	Aao Saare Nachiye
Uchiyan Imartan	2009	Babbu Maan	Point Zero	Aao Saare Nachiye 2
Aashquan Di Line	2009	Babbu Maan	Point Zero	Aao Saare Nachiye 2
Sari Duniya	2011	Babbu Maan	Point Zero	Aao Saare Nachiye 4
Mil Gayi Pind De Morh Te	2013	Babbu Maan	Swag Music	Talaash: In Search of Soul
Singh	2013	Babbu Maan	Swag Music	Aah Chak 2013
Maa Boli	2014	Babbu Maan	Swag Music	Aah Chak 2014
Chamkila	2014	Jatt Band	Swag Music	Aah Chak 2014
Canada Canada	2014	Babbu Maan	Swag Music	
21st Century Saadh	2014	Babbu Maan	Swag Music	
America America	2014	Babbu Maan	Swag Music	
Khat	2014	Babbu Maan	Swag Music	Mera Gham 2
License	2015	Babbu Maan	Swag Music	Aah Chak 2015
E Doye Naina	2015	Babbu Maan	Swag Music	
Murgi	2016	Babbu Maan	Swag Music	Aah Chak 2016
Jogiya	2016	Babbu Maan	Swag Music	
Khu Te Bar ft.Badshah (rapper)	2016	Jaidev Kumar	Sony Music India	Terminator
Rally	2017	Babbu Maan	Swag Music	Aah Chak 2017
Mehndi	2017	Babbu Maan	Swag Music	Ik C Pagal
Gorgeous	2017	Babbu Maan	Swag Music	Ik C Pagal
Barish ke Bahane	2017	Dj Sheizwood	Zee Music Company	
Telefoon	2017	Babbu Maan	Hey Yolo & Swag Music	
Samundar	2017	Babbu Maan	Hey Yolo & Swag Music	
Mere Fan	2018	Babbu Maan	Swag Music	Aah Chak 2018
Teri Yaad aati hai	2018	Dj Sheizwood	Venus	N/A
Chandigarh	2019	Babbu Maan	Hey yolo Music	Aah Chak 2019
Dard	2019	Babbu Maan	T-Series (company)	
Tera Fan	2020	Babbu Maan	Navrattan Music	
Hollywood	2020	Babbu Maan	Swag Music	Mera Gham 2
Ik Din ft. Shipra Goyal	2020	Babbu Maan	Swag Music	
Adab Punjabi	2021	Babbu Maan	Swag Music	Pagal Shayar
Rat Race	2021	Babbu Maan	Swag Music	Pagal Shayar
Barsaat	2021	Babbu Maan	Swag Music	Single Track
Babe Da Khooh	2021	Babbu Maan	Swag Music	
Purani Yaari (with Jazzy B)	2021	Harj Nagra	Jazzy B Records	
Dhuan (Social Track)	2021	Babbu Maan	Swag Music	
Ishqpura (Version 1) & (Version 2) ft. Mohammad Sadiq)	2021	Babbu Maan	Swag Music	
Rally 2	2021	Babbu Maan	Swag Music	
Angrai	2021	Babbu Maan	Swag Music	
Saun Raab Di	2022	Babbu Maan	Swag Music	
Bhari Mehfil	2022	Amol Dangi	Meri Tune	
Hawaa	2022	Babbu Maan	Swag Music	
Itna Pyar Karuga (ft.Shipra Goyal)	2022	Shipra Goyal	Blue Beat Studios	
Telepathy	2022	Babbu Maan	Swag Music	Adab Punjabi 2
Singh Soorme	2022	Babbu Maan	Swag Music	Singh is better than king vol.2
Gal Ni Hoyi	2022	Babbu Maan	Swag Music	Adab Punjabi 2
All Alone	2022	Babbu Maan	Swag Music	

=== Film songs ===
==== Punjabi ====
Year	Film	Songs	Notes
2006	Rabb Ne Banayian Jodiean	"Sada Kiye ", "Kad Pyaar Ho Gaya", "Kudiye", "Rabb Ne Banaiyan Jodiean", "Butta", "Boli O Boli", "Punjab"	
2007	Waagah	"Oye Mundeyo"	with Shreya Ghoshal
2008	Hashar : A Love Story	"Jeth Da Dupehra", "Kabaddi Kabaddi", "Dukhrhe Den Layee", "Chandigarh Boli Paendi", "Thandi Thandi", "Bhangra Paun De", "Nachna Main Nachna", "Hashar"	
2010	Ekam: Son of Soil	"Lor", "Kohra", "Sharabi", "Chann", "Holi", "Pind", "Mitti", "Rail"	
2011	Hero Hitler in Love	"Chardi Jawani", "Heer", "Hitler", "Jatt Marjuga", "Mirza", "Rabb Mil Jawe", "Sharab", "Sher", "Supney"	
2012	Desi Romeos	"Kabootri" (Remix)", "Output Zero", "Sohaniyan", "Sardari", "Chandigarh", "Mutiyar", "Why Don't You", "Kabootri"	
2012	Dil Tainu Karda Hai Pyar	"Peeni Ae Peeni Ae"	
2014	Baaz	"Baaz", "Makaan", "Mehrmaan", "Kuddi Mardi", "Chor Police"	
2018	Banjara	"Jua", "Nachne Da Mood", "Tralla 2", "Safar", "Dil Ta Dil Hai"	

==== Bollywood ====
Year	Film	Songs	Notes
2003	Khel – No Ordinary Game	"Sharrata"	with Sukhwinder Singh
2003	Hawayein	"Bhangra Paa Laiye", "Meri Muskan(Sad)", "Teri Yaad", "Meri Muskaan", "Hawayein(Sad)", "Nachoongi Saari Raat", "Hawayein", "Pabb Chak De", "Aaja O Yaara"	
2009	Vaada Raha	"Rabb Na Kare", "Rabb Na Kare - Slow"	
2010	Crook	"Challa", "Challa (Tigerstyle Remix)"	with Suzanne D'Mello
2011	Saheb, Biwi Aur Gangster	"Jugni"	Music by Jaidev Kumar
2016	31st October	"Umeed - Reprise Version"	Featured in Song's Video

== Filmography ==
Year	Film	Actor	Producer	Singer	Music director	Lyricist	screenWriter	Notes
2003	Khel – No Ordinary Game			Yes		Yes		Bollywood
2003	Hawayein	Yes	Yes	Yes	Yes	Yes		Debut Hindi/Punjabi film
2006	Rabb Ne Banaiyan Jodiean	Yes		Yes	Yes	Yes		Punjabi
2007	Waagah			Yes		Yes		Punjabi
2008	Hashar : A Love Story	Yes	Yes	Yes	Yes			Punjabi
2009	Vaada Raha			Yes	Yes	Yes		Bollywood
2010	Ekam – Son of Soil	Yes	Yes	Yes	Yes	Yes	Yes	Punjabi
2010	Crook			Yes		Yes		Bollywood
2011	Saheb, Biwi Aur Gangster			Yes		Yes		Bollywood
2011	Hero Hitler in Love	Yes	Yes	Yes	Yes	Yes	Yes	Punjabi
2012	Desi Romeos	Yes	Yes	Yes	Yes	Yes	Yes	Punjabi
2012	Dil Tainu Karda Hai Pyar		Yes		No			Punjabi
2014	Baaz	Yes	Yes	Yes	Yes	Yes		Punjabi
2016	31st October			Yes				Bollywood
2018	Banjara	Yes		Yes	Yes	Yes		Punjabi
2024	Sucha Soorma	Yes	No	Yes	Yes	Yes	No	Punjabi
2025	Shaunki Sardar	Yes		Yes	Yes	Yes		Punjabi (with Guru Randhawa,Nimrit Kaur Ahluwalia)
