= Khant, Punjab =

Khant Khant Maanpur/Manpur
- village
- Location in Punjab, India Khant (India)
- Coordinates: 30.79°N 76.43°E
- Country: India
- State: Punjab
- District: Fatehgarh Sahib
- Talukas: Khamanon

Languages
  - Official: Punjabi
  - Regional: Punjabi
- Time zone: UTC+5:30 (IST)
- Nearest city: Morinda

Khant is a small village in the Khamanon tehsil of Fatehgarh Sahib district in Punjab, India. Maanpur is just 0.6 km away in the east so they often called Khant Maanpur, together. A noted Punjabi singer-songwriter and actor, Babbu Maan, belongs to the village.

== Geography ==
Khant is approximately centered at 30°47′N 76°26′E, on the Chandigarh-Ludhiana section of National Highway 5. Morinda (Rupnagar district) is the nearest city. The tehsil main town and the nearest police station, Khamanon, is just 8 km away in the west. Prem Pura, Kajauli, Panecha and Pohlo Majra are the surrounding villages.

== See also ==
- Babbu Maan
- Buttar Sarinh
- Raipur
