= Sakan (plasterwork) =

Plasterwork of Japan

Sakan (左官) refers to the plasterwork of Japan. Along with woodblock prints, ukiyo-e, Japanese pottery and porcelain, Sakan is a genre of traditional Japanese craft. It flourished during the Edo period (1603-1868) and continues to be practiced in the present day.

Recently, Japanese artists have been creating modern interpretations of sakan plasterwork as a form of art.

Traditionally, earth, lime, plant fibers, sands and aggregates are the most common constituents in Japanese plaster. It was often used for traditional buildings such as tea houses and storehouses. Plaster can survive both moisture and extremely dry environments, making it an ideal material for Japan, where the humidity levels vary greatly throughout the year. It can also withstand large earthquakes, up to level 7.
