= Ekam: Son of Soil =

- Directed by: Mandeep Benipal
- Written by: Babbu Maan
- Produced by: B S Maan (Khant)
- Starring: Babbu Maan, Mandy Takhar, Mohitinder Bawa, Bhagwant Maan
- Narrated by: Yogesh Grover
- Cinematography: AKN Sabestian
- Edited by: Hemant Chavan, Grosoft India
- Music by: Babbu Maan
- Release date: 23 April 2010
- Running time: 148 minutes
- Country: India
- Language: Punjabi
- Budget: 1 crore

Ekam: Son of Soil is a 2010 Punjabi film directed by Mandeep Benipal (who earlier assisted Gaurav Trehan in Hashar) with story, screenplay and dialogues by Master Tarlochan Singh. It was produced by B S Maan (Khant) and Darshan Singh Grewal (executive producer), starring Babbu Maan, Mandy Takhar, Mohitinder Bawa, Bhagwant Mann, Amrik Gill, Binnu Dhillon, Anita Shabdeesh, Tarsem Paul, Surinder Rehal, Garry Waraich and Ravinder Mand. 7.2 crore collection highest grosser movie in 2010

== Plot ==
Ekam (Babbu Maan) returns to India from Australia because of his father's (Jagmeet Singh) wish. His father wants him to stay with him and his second wife (Sheelam) and her son (Monty). His wish is to see his entire family live happily together, but Ekam realises that he is not accepted by his stepmother and stepbrother. He misses his real mother who is no more. Corrupt MLA (Iqbal Singh) is a close family friend and a business partner to Ekam's family. Iqbal Singh's daughter Navneet falls in love with Ekam. In spite of their different thoughts they become close and want to live life together, to which their families have no issues. All efforts from Jagmeet Singh are not able to bring his family together; he is deeply hurt and one day dies of a heart attack.

After his father's death Ekam is on a crossroad. He does not know where to go. He decides to fulfill his father's wish and moves to his ancestral house in the village, where he has lot of childhood memories. Once he reaches the village he comes across problems faced by villagers and how they are exploited by politicians and others. Ekam fights for their rights and brings a positive change to the village. This is not accepted by MLA Iqbal Singh who sees Ekam as a threat to his vicious plans. He warns his daughter Navneet to stay away from Ekam. But Ekam, a "true son of soil" cannot be stopped from achieving his goal.

== Cast ==
Actor/Actress	Role
Babbu Maan	Ekamjeet
Mandy Takhar	Navneet
Mohitinder Bawa	Navroop
Bhagwant Mann	Kewal Sharma
Amrik Gill	Sarpanch
Tarsem Paul	Jagmeet Singh
Surinder Rehal	Iqbal Singh
Garry Waraich	Monty
Anita Sabteesh	Sheelam
Binnu Dhillon	Bhagat
Ravinder Mand	Thangi

== Production ==
The film was mostly shot in Babbu Maan's own village (pind), Khantmaanpur and some shoot in Bagrian Haveli (Sangrur) Punjab and places like Chandigarh, Kharar and Banur.

== Release ==
The film released on 23 April 2010.

== Soundtrack ==
The soundtrack is composed by the critically acclaimed singer/music composer/lyricist Babbu Maan, who also plays the lead role in the film. The musical soundtrack has of eight original songs.

Ekam: Son of soil

Soundtrack album by Babbu Maan

Track	Song	Singer(s)	Composer	Duration
1	"Lor"	Babbu Maan	Babbu Maan	04:41
2	"Holi"	Babbu Maan	Babbu Maan	03:51
3	"Kohra"	Babbu Maan, Aarti Gill	Babbu Maan	04:49
4	"Pind"	Babbu Maan	Babbu Maan	04:59
5	"Sharabi"	Babbu Maan	Babbu Maan	04:44
6	"Mitti"	Babbu Maan	Babbu Maan	03:30
7	"Chan"	Babbu Maan	Babbu Maan	05:19
8	"Rail"	Babbu Maan, Aarti Gill	Babbu Maan	04:14
