= Rukhsar Rehman =

Indian actress and model

- Rehman in 2012
- Born: 1978 or 1979 (age 47–48); Rampur Uttar Pradesh India
- Other name: Rukhsar
- Occupations: Actress; Model
- Years active: 1992–present
- Children: Aisha Ahmed

Rukhsar Rehman is an Indian film and television actress and model who works in Hindi films.

== Early life ==
Rehman's father was an IAS officer who was culturally shocked by the film industry, stopped her from continuing her movie career.

== Career ==
Rehman made her film debut in 1992 with a lead role in Deepak Anand's Yaad Rakhegi Duniya opposite Aditya Pancholi and also appeared in J.K. Bihari's Inteha Pyar Ki opposite Rishi Kapoor. However, at the request of her father, she left her career and moved back to her hometown, Rampur, Uttar Pradesh, to start a garment business.

In 2005, she returned to acting with Ram Gopal Verma's crime drama D, in which she played Randeep Hooda's girlfriend. She also featured in Verma's Sarkar the same year. In 2008, she appeared in Rumi Jaffery's God Tussi Great Ho as Salman Khan's sister. In 2009, she starred in The Stoneman Murders alongside Kay Kay Menon. Film critic Taran Adarsh in his review for the film called her a "complete natural". She also had supporting roles in Benny and Babloo (2010), Knock Out (2010), Allah Ke Banday (2010), Shaitan (2011) and PK (2014).

Even though she had small roles her performances in movies like Sarkar, PK, 'The Night Manager' and 'Uri: The Surgical Strike' have been described as nuanced and memorable.

Uttar Da Puttar is her upcoming 2026 Indian Hindi comedy social satire film directed by Ravinder Siwach. It stars Annu Kapoor in main lead role, along with Rukhsar Rehman, Brijendra Kala, Pavan Malhotra, Ishtiyak Khan and Jeeveshu Ahluwalia.

In television, she has featured in Sony Entertainment Television's medical drama Kuch Toh Log Kahenge (2011–13) as Dr. Mallika and in Life OK's Tumhari Paakhi (2013–14) as Lavanya. She did a cameo in Star Plus's Diya Aur Baati Hum as Mehak. Rehman also did a critically acclaimed Malayalam film, Take Off (2017). She has appeared in campaigns for brands like Kaya Skin Clinic, Asian Paints, Saffola salt and others.

== Filmography ==
=== Films ===
- Yaad Rakhegi Duniya (1992)
- Inteha Pyar Ki (1992)
- Sarkar (2005)
- D - Underworld (2005)
- God Tussi Great Ho (2008)
- The Stoneman Murders (2009)
- Accident on Hill Road (2009)
- Thanks Maa (2010)
- Benny and Babloo (2010)
- Knock Out (2010)
- Allah Ke Banday (2010)
- Shaitan (2011)
- Bheja Fry 2 (2011)
- Life Ki Toh Lag Gayi (2012)
- PK (2014)
- Love Games (2016)
- Take off (2017), Malayalam film
- Uri: The Surgical Strike (2019)
- The Body (2019)
- 83 (2021)
- Khuda Haafiz: Chapter 2 – Agni Pariksha (2022)
- Uttar Da Puttar (2026)
- Awarapan 2 (2026) as Namrata
- Batwara 1947 (2026)

=== Web series ===
- The Gone Game (2020–2022)
- The Night Manager (Indian TV series) (2023)

=== Television ===
- Bhaskar Bharti (2009)
- Kuch Toh Log Kahenge (2011–13)
- Baal Veer (2012)
- Tumhari Paakhi (2013–14)
- Aur Pyaar Ho Gaya (2014)
- Adaalat (2014)
- Dream Girl (2015)
- Diya Aur Baati Hum (2016)
- Haq Se (2018)
- Mariam Khan - Reporting Live (May 2018 – Jan 2019)
