= Palace Hotel, Tokyo =

Luxury hotel in Tokyo, Japan

Coordinates: 35.6847404°N 139.7612804°E

Palace Hotel Tokyo
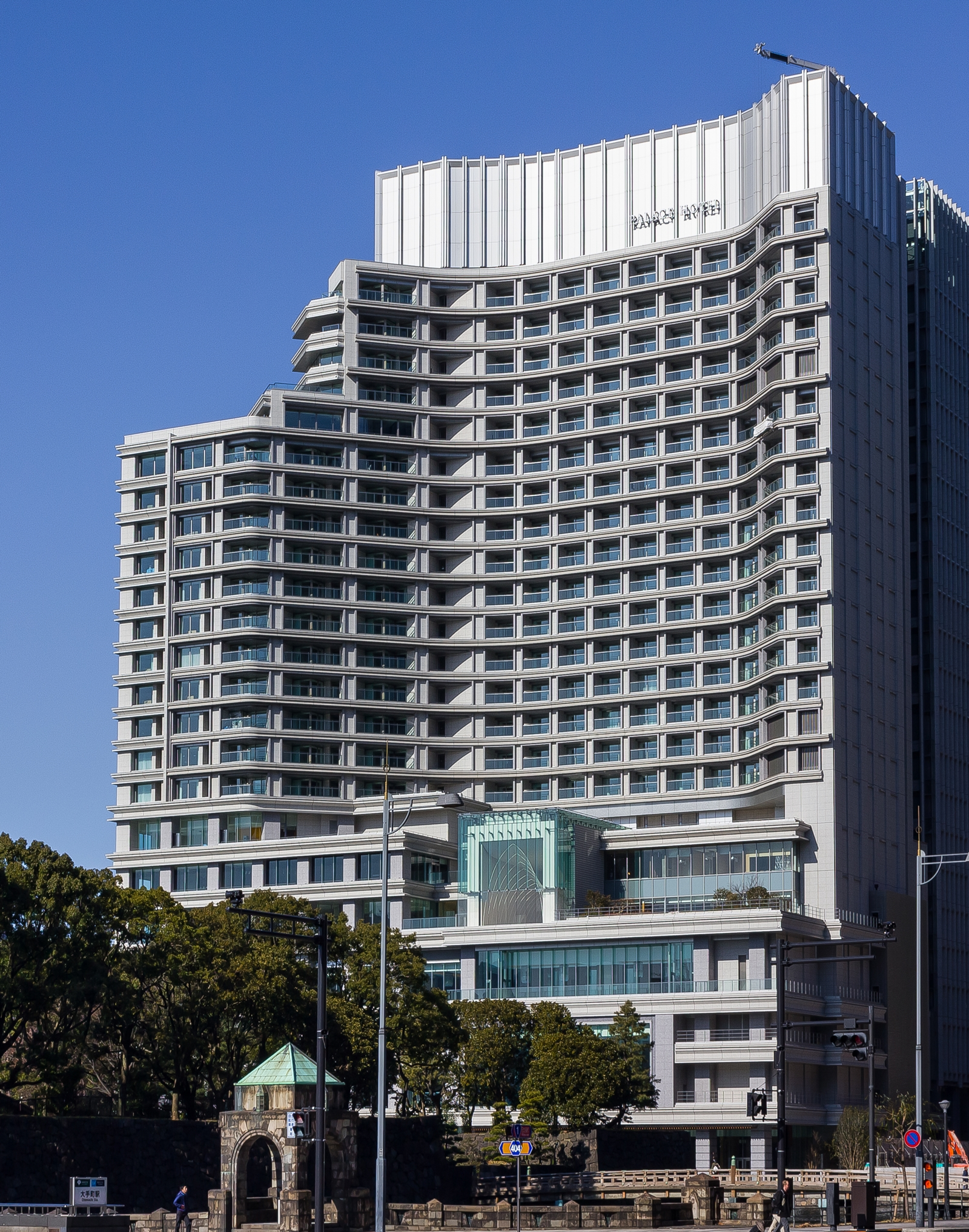
- Interactive map of the Palace Hotel Tokyo area

General information
- Location: 1-1-1 Marunouchi, Chiyoda-ku, Tokyo 100-0005, Japan
- Opening: 2012
- Owner: Palace Hotel Co. Ltd.
- Operator: Palace Hotel Co. Ltd.

Technical details
- Floor count: 23

Design and construction
- Architect: Mitsubishi Jisho Sekkei

Other information
- Number of rooms: 290
- Number of suites: 12
- Number of restaurants: 10

Website
- http://en.palacehoteltokyo.com

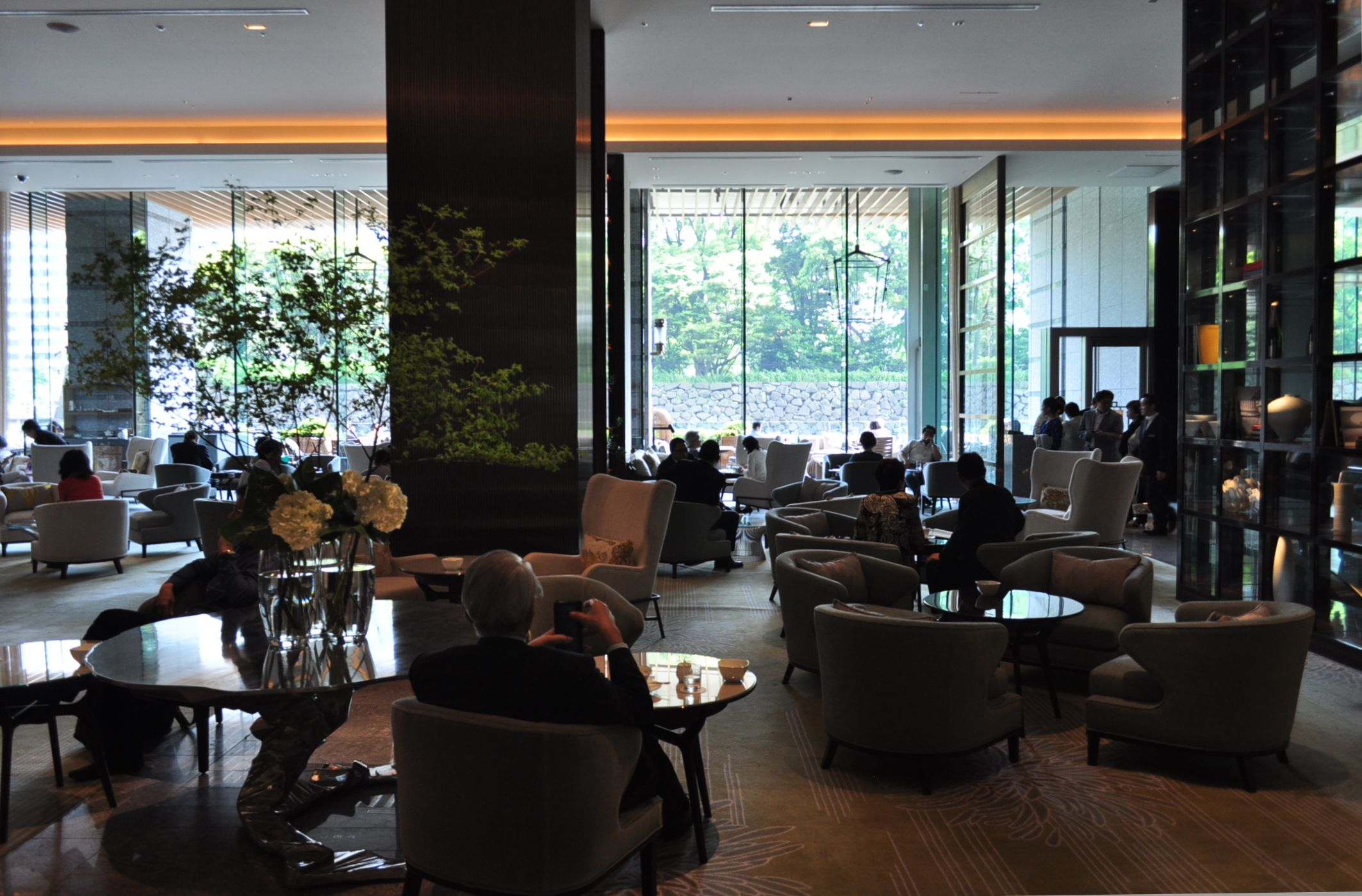
Palace Hotel Tokyo

Palace Hotel Tokyo (Japanese: パレスホテル東京) is a luxury hotel located in the Marunouchi business district of Tokyo, Japan. The hotel has 290 guestrooms and facilities, including 10 restaurants and bars, a spa, a fitness center, swimming pool and a business center.

== Location ==
Palace Hotel Tokyo is located at 1-1-1 Marunouchi, across from the Ōte-mon Gate of the Imperial Palace in the Chiyoda ward in central Tokyo.

== History ==
Palace Hotel Tokyo is owned by Palace Hotel Co. Ltd., a private consortium of shareholders first formed in 1961. The company's founder and first president was Masatomo Yoshihara.

The new hotel succeeds two previous hotels, the Hotel Teito (Japanese: ホテル テイト) and Palace Hotel (Japanese: パレスホテル), which occupied the same site from 1947 and 1961 respectively. Each was razed to make way for its successor.

Construction of the original building that occupied the same location on which Palace Hotel Tokyo now stands was completed in December 1937 for use as the Forestry Office of the Imperial Household Agency. After World War II, on the order of the Supreme Commander for the Allied Powers, it was rebuilt for use as a hotel under government ownership and administration for the exclusive use of buying agents from abroad.

Hotel Teito's land and building were sold to the private sector in 1959 and the hotel was demolished and rebuilt as the Palace Hotel, which opened for business on October 1, 1961. Palace Hotel was awarded the Architectural Industry Association Prize in 1963 for its success in blending modern architectural style with Japanese aesthetics.

In 2009, Palace Hotel closed for three years for demolition and rebuilding. The new building retains the shigaraki tiles that lined the original hotel's exterior and the Chiyoda Suite's traditional ink wash painting, and also restored the original bar counter from Royal Bar.

== Hotel ==
=== Spa & Fitness ===
Palace Hotel was the first hotel in Japan to have an Evian spa. The spa is located on the 5th floor, next to a fitness center and an indoor swimming pool with floor-to-ceiling windows looking out on to the Imperial Palace Plaza.

=== Restaurants & Bars ===
The hotel has 10 restaurants and bars offering both Japanese and international fare.

=== Additional facilities & amenities ===
The hotel also has facilities to host conventions and weddings. The 19th floor offers a club lounge.

== Awards ==
- Travel Top 50 – 2012-2013 Monocle magazine UK.
- 2013 World’s Greatest Hotels book – Travel + Leisure United States.
- Best Hotel with 100 Rooms or More – 2013 Travel + Leisure Design Awards United States.
- Forbes Travel Guide Five-Star Award – Forbes Travel Guide Five-Star Award United States.
- 2015 Condé Nast Traveler USA Readers’ Choice Award – Condé Nast Traveler United States.
- Hot List 2013: Best New Hotels with Great Food – Condé Nast Traveler United States.
