= Sidhu Moose Wala discography =

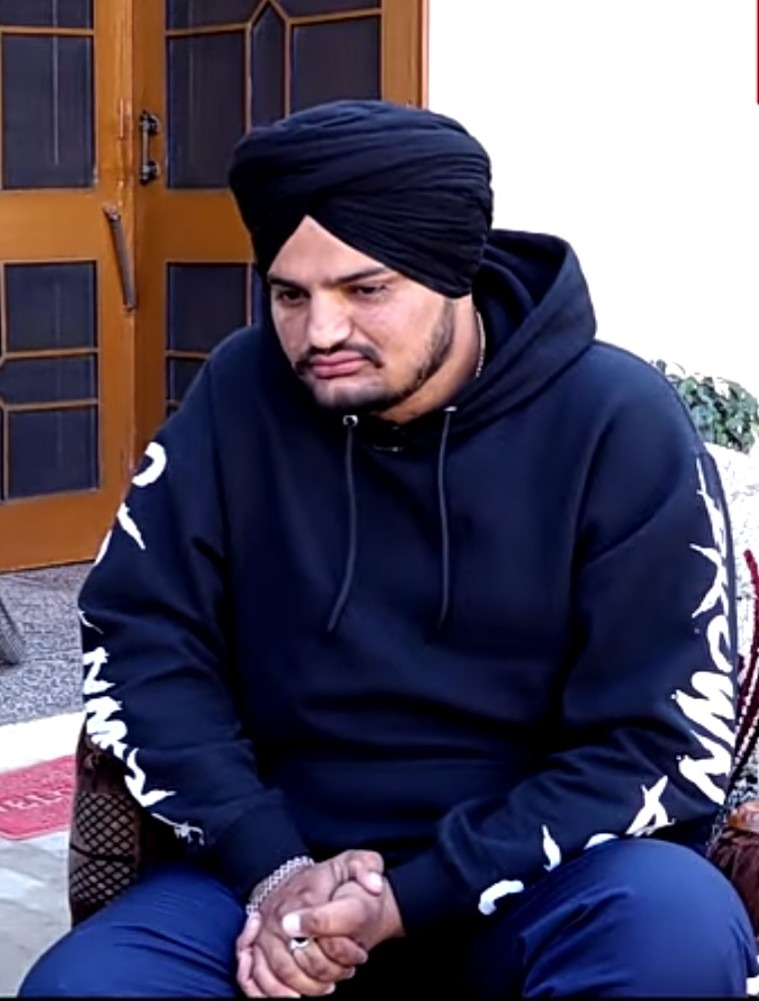
- Studio albums: 2
- EPs: 2
- Soundtrack albums: 1
- Singles: 110
- Mixtape: 1
- As songwriter: 22
- As executive producer: 14

Sidhu Moose Wala was an Indian Punjabi singer, rapper, songwriter and actor associated with Punjabi music and films, who has released two studio album, one mixtape, one soundtrack album, two extended play and one hundred & ten singles.

== Albums ==
=== Studio albums ===
List of studio albums, with release date, label and selected chart positions
Title	Album details	Peak chart positions	
Title	Album details	CAN	NZ
PBX 1	Released: 18 October 2018; Label: T-Series; Format: Digital download • streaming	66	—
Moosetape	Released: 15 May 2021; Label: Self-released; Format: Digital download • streaming	65	33

=== Soundtrack album ===
Title	Details
Yes I Am Student	Released:11 October 2021; Label: Tips Punjabi; Format: Digital download, streaming

== Mixtapes ==
List of commercial mixtapes, with release date
Title	Album details
Snitches Get Stitches	Released: 9 May 2020; Label: Self-released; Format: Digital download • streaming

== Extended plays ==
List of EPs, with release date, label and selected chart positions
Title	EP details	Peak chart positions
Title	EP details	CAN
No Name	Released: 25 April 2022; Label: Self-released; Format: Digital download, streaming	50
Moose Print	Released: 11 June 2025; Label: Self-released; Format: Digital download, streaming	—

== Singles ==
=== As lead artist ===
List of singles as lead artist, with selected chart positions, showing year released and album name
Title	Year	Music	Peak chart position								Certifications	Label	Album
Title	Year	Music	CAN	IND	NZ Hot	UK	UK Asian	UK Punjabi	WW	WW Excl. US	Certifications	Label	Album
"G-Wagon" (with Gurlez Akhtar)	2017	Deep Jandu	—	—	—	—	—	—	—	—		13 Music Records	Non-album singles
"Lifestsyle" (featuring Banka & Raja Game Changers)	2017	Raja Game Changer	—	—	—	—	—	—	—	—		13 Music Records	Non-album singles
"So High" (Note: A shorter version released in Mar Gaye Oye Loko soundtrack Won Best Lyricist Award at Brit Asia Music Awards)	2017	Byg Byrd	—	—	—	—	—	—	—	—		Humble Music	Non-album singles
"Issa Jatt" (with Sunny Malton)	2017	Byg Byrd	—	—	—	—	—	—	—	—		Humble Music	Non-album singles
"Koom Kalan Kabaddi Cup"	2017	Mad Mix	—	—	—	—	—	—	—	—		Humble Music	Non-album singles
"Just Listen" (featuring Sunny Malton)	2018	Byg Byrd	—	—	—	—	12	—	—	—		Humble Music	Non-album singles
"It's All About You" (Note: Most viewed YouTube video worldwide on Valentine's Day, 2018)	2018	Intense	—	—	—	—	—	—	—	—		Humble Music	Non-album singles
"Tochan" (featuring Byg Byrd)	2018	Byg Byrd	—	—	—	—	20	—	—	—		Humble Music	Non-album singles
"Famous" (featuring Intense)	2018	Intense	—	—	—	—	17	—	—	—		Lavish Squad	Non-album singles
"Dark Love"	2018	Intense	—	—	—	—	—	—	—	—		Humble Music	Non-album singles
"Warning Shots" (with Sunny Malton)	2018	MixSingh	—	—	—	—	—	—	—	—		Los Pro	Non-album singles
"Dollar"	2018	Byg Byrd	—	—	—	—	9	—	—	—		While Hill Music	Dakuaan Da Munda soundtrack
"Jaan"	2018		—	—	—	—	—	—	—	—		Jattlife Studios	re-released version added to Yes I Am Student soundtrack
"Hate"	2018	Dev Next Level	—	—	—	—	—	—	—	—		Jattlife Studios	Non-album singles
"Jatt Da Muqabala"	2018	Snappy	—	—	—	—	11	—	—	—		T-Series	PBX 1
"Badfella"	2018	Harj Nagra	—	—	—	—	24	—	—	—		T-Series	PBX 1
"I’m Better Now"	2018	Snappy	—	—	—	—	—	—	—	—		T-Series	PBX 1
"Dawood"	2018	Byg Byrd	—	—	—	—	26	—	—	—		T-Series	PBX 1
"Bhang de Bhane" (Note: Also titled as 'Badmashi' on some audio platforms) (with Intense & Sharan Kaur Panesar)	2018	Intense	—	—	—	—	33	—	—	—		Intense Global Music	Exhale by Intense
"Outlaw"	2019	Byg Byrd	—	—	—	—	—	—	—	—		Jatt Life Studios	Non-album singles
"Chosen" (featuring Sunny Malton)	2019	The Kidd	—	—	—	—	—	—	—	—		Saga Music	Non-album singles
"Legend" (Note: Won 'Track of the Year' (2019–2020) at Brit Asia Music Awards.)	2019	The Kidd	—	—	—	—	29	—	—	—		Sidhu Moose Wala	Non-album singles
"Cut Off"	2019	Game Changerz	—	—	—	—	—	—	—	—		Planet Records	Non-album singles
"East Side Flow"	2019	Byg Byrd	—	—	—	—	—		—	—		Juke Dock	Non-album singles
"Sidhu's Anthem" (with Sunny Malton)	2019	Byg Byrd	—	—	—	—	—	—	—	—		Sidhu Moose Wala / Sky Digital	Non-album singles
"Mafia Style"	2019	Aman Hayer	—	—	—	—	32	—	—	—		Sidhu Moose Wala / Sky Digital	Non-album singles
"Poison" (with R Nait)	2019	The Kidd	—	—	—	—	—	—	—	—		Sidhu Moose Wala / Sky Digital	Non-album singles
"Sohne Lagde" (with The PropheC)	2019	The PropheC	—	—	—	—	3	8	—	—		Sidhu Moose Wala / Sky Digital	Non-album singles
"Hathyaar"	2019	The Kidd	—	—	—	—	—	—	—	—		Geet Mp3	Sikander 2 soundtrack
"Hauli Hauli" (with Byg Byrd & Sunny Malton)	2019	Byg Byrd	—	—	—	—	—	—	—	—		Brown Boys Records	Brown Boys Forever
"Dogar"	2019	Snappy	—	—	—	—	—	—	—	—		White Hill Music	‘Teri Meri Jodi’ soundtrack
"Jatti Jeone Mour Wargi"	2019	The Kidd	—	—	—	—	6	3	—	—		White Hill Music	Ardab Mutiyaran soundtrack
"B-Town" (featuring Sunny Malton)	2019	Byg Byrd	—	—	—	—	—	—	—	—		Sony Music	Non-album singles
"47" (with Mist & Steel Banglez featuring Stefflon Don)	2019	Steel Banglez	—	—	23	17	1	1	—	—		Catalyst	Non-album singles
"Forget About It" (with Sunny Malton)	2019	Byg Byrd	—	—	—	—	—	—	—	—		Jatt Life Studios	Non-album singles
"Dhakka" (featuring Afsana Khan)	2019	The Kidd	—	—	—	—	—	—	—	—		Sidhu Moose Wala / Sky Digital	Non-album singles
"Flex/ El Chapo" (Note: Not announced officially by Sidhu Moose Wala team)	2020	Intense	—	—	—	—	—	—	—	—		Intense, Folk Mafia	Non-album singles
"Gwacheya Gurbakash" (featuring R Nait)	2020	The Kidd	—	—	—	—	—	—	—	—		Sidhu Moose Wala, Sky Digital	Non-album singles
"Tibbeyan Da Putt"	2020	The Kidd	—	—	—	—	—	—	—	—		Sidhu Moose Wala, Sky Digital	Non-album singles
"911" (featuring Raja Game Changers)	2020	Game Changerz	—	—	—	—	—	—	—	—		Sidhu Moose Wala, Sky Digital	Non-album singles
"Approach"	2020	Game Changerz	—	—	—	—	—	—	—	—		Sidhu Moose Wala, Sky Digital	Non-album singles
"8 Cylinder"	2020	Game Changerz	—	—	—	—	—	—	—	—		Sidhu Moose Wala, Sky Digital	Non-album singles
Boss	2020	Snappy	—	—	—	—	—	—	—	—		Sidhu Moose Wala, Sky Digital	Snitches Get Stitches
"Roti"	2020	The Kidd	—	—	—	—	—	—	—	—		Sidhu Moose Wala, Sky Digital	Snitches Get Stitches
"Dear Mama"	2020	The Kidd	—	12	—	—	—	—	—	—		Sidhu Moose Wala, Sky Digital	Non-album singles
"Bambiha Bole" (with Amrit Maan)	2020	Ikky (Ikwinder Singh)	—	—	10	—	1	1	—	—		Sidhu Moose Wala, Sky Digital	Non-album singles
"Sanju"	2020	The Kidd	—	—	32	—	—	—	—	—		Sidhu Moose Wala, Sky Digital	Non-album singles
"Doctor"	2020	The Kidd	—	—	—	—	—	—	—	—		Sidhu Moose Wala, Sky Digital	Non-album singles
"No Worries" (with Raja Game Changers)	2020	Game Changerz	—	—	—	—	—	—	—	—		Planet Recordz	Non-album singles
"My Block"	2020	Byg Byrd	—	—	—	—	—	—	—	—		Saga Music	Non-album singles
"Bad"	2020	Dev Ocean	—	—	40	—	3	—	—	—		Speed Records	Non-album singles
"Panjab – My Motherland"	2020	The Kidd	—	—	35	—	—	—	—	—		Sidhu Moose Wala	Non-album singles
"Sin"	2021	The Kidd	—	—	—	—	25	—	—	—		Sony	Non-album singles
"Bitch I'm Back"	2021	The Kidd	81	—	14	—	—	6	—	—		Sidhu Moose Wala	Moosetape
"Burberry"	2021	The Kidd	—	—	29	—	3	2	—	—		Sidhu Moose Wala	Moosetape
"Unfuckwithable" - Bonus Track (with Afsana Khan)	2021	The Kidd	—	—	—	—	6	4	—	—		Sidhu Moose Wala	Moosetape
"Racks and Rounds" (featuring Sikander Kahlon)	2021	The Kidd	—	—	16	—	5	3	—	—		Sidhu Moose Wala	Moosetape
"Us" (featuring Raja Kumari)	2021	The Kidd	—	—	23	—	4	3	—	—		Sidhu Moose Wala	Moosetape
"Moosedrilla" (featuring Divine)	2021	The Kidd	—	—	25	—	6	4	—	—		Sidhu Moose Wala	Moosetape
"Brown Shortie"	2021	The Kidd	80	—	15	—	3	2	—	—		Sidhu Moose Wala	Moosetape
"Me and My Girlfriend"	2021	The Kidd	—	—	—	—	—	5	—	—		Sidhu Moose Wala	Moosetape
"These Days" (featuring Bohemia)	2021	The Kidd	—	—	33	—	8	2	—	—		Sidhu Moose Wala	Moosetape
"Signed to God"	2021	Steel Banglez, The Kidd, Jay B	—	—	—	—	8	3	—	—		Sidhu Moose Wala	Moosetape
"Malwa Block"	2021	Wazir Patar	—	—	—	—	—	—	—	—		Sidhu Moose Wala	Moosetape
"Invincible" (featuring Stefflon Don)	2021	Steel Banglez, The Kidd	—	—	35	—	—	—	—	—		Sidhu Moose Wala	Moosetape
"G-Shit" (featuring Blockboi Twitch)	2021	The Kidd	—	—	20	—	28	—	—	—		Sidhu Moose Wala	Moosetape
"Built Different"	2021	The Kidd	—	—	33	—	—	—	—	—		Sidhu Moose Wala	Moosetape
"Calaboose"	2021	Snappy	—	—	24	—	—	—	—	—		Sidhu Moose Wala	Moosetape
"295"	2021	The Kidd	62	1	37	—	8	—	154	73		Sidhu Moose Wala	Moosetape
"IDGAF" (featuring Morrisson)	2021	The Kidd	—	—	—	—	16	—	—	—		Sidhu Moose Wala	Moosetape
"Power"	2021	The Kidd	—	—	—	—	14	—	—	—		Sidhu Moose Wala	Moosetape
"GOAT"	2021	Wazir Patar	100	19	—	—	—	—	—	—		Sidhu Moose Wala	Moosetape
"Celebrity Killer" (featuring Tion Wayne)	2021	Steel Banglez, The Kidd, JB, A Singh, M1, Chris Rich	—	—	—	—	12	—	—	—		Sidhu Moose Wala	Moosetape
"Jailaan"	2021	The Kidd	—	—	—	—	31	—	—	—		Times Music	Moosa Jatt soundtrack
"Saab" (with Gurtaj)	2021	The Kidd	—	—	—	—	—	—	—	—		Tips Music	Yes I Am Student soundtrack
"Athra Style" (with Jenny Johal)	2021	The Kidd	—	—	—	—	—	—	—	—		Tips Music	Yes I Am Student soundtrack
"Jaan"	2021	Intense	—	—	—	—	—	—	—	—		Tips Music	Yes I Am Student soundtrack
"Yaarian"	2021	The Kidd	—	—	—	—	—	—	—	—		Tips Music	Yes I Am Student soundtrack
"Baapu"	2021	Intense	—	—	—	—	—	—	—	—		Tips Music	Snitches Get Stitches & Yes I Am Student
"Satisfy" (with Shooter Kahlon)	2021	Trippy	—	—	—	—	21	10	—	—		5911 Records	Non-album singles
"Youngest in Charge" (featuring Sunny Malton)	2022	The Kidd	—	—	—	—	—	—	—	—		Sidhu Moose Wala	Non-album singles
"Fuck Em All" (with Sunny Malton)	2022	Shiesty Beatz & Yyungish	—	—	—	—	31	—	—	—		Sidhu Moose Wala	Non-album singles
"ScapeGoat"	2022	Mxrci	—	—	—	—	10	8	—	—		Sidhu Moose Wala	Non-album singles
"Never Fold" (with Sunny Malton)	2022	SOE	92	22	19	—	3	3	—	—		Sidhu Moose Wala	No Name
"0 to 100"	2022	Mxrci	—	—	34	—	12	7	—	—		Sidhu Moose Wala	No Name
"Love Sick"(featuring AR Paisley)	2022	Mxrci	—	—	39	—	25	4	—	—		Sidhu Moose Wala	No Name
"Everybody Hurts"	2022	JayB	—	—	—	—	13	4	—	—		Sidhu Moose Wala	No Name
Bloodlust (featuring Mr. Capone-E)	2022	Snappy	—	—	—	—	—	12	—	—		Sidhu Moose Wala	No Name
"The Last Ride" (with Wazir Patar)	2022	Wazir Patar	25	1	18	—	1	1	—	103		Sidhu Moose Wala	Non-album singles
"Levels" (featuring Sunny Malton)	2022	The Kidd	32	4	15	—	1	2	—	195	MC: Platinum	Sidhu Moose Wala	Non-album singles
"SYL" (Note: Posthumous single. The song was blocked from YouTube India by the government on 26 June.)	2022	Mxrci	27	3	13	—	1	1	—	200		Sidhu Moose Wala	Non-album singles
"Vaar"	2022	Snappy	64	5	19	—	3	2	—	—		Sidhu Moose Wala	Non-album singles
"Mera Na" (with Burna Boy & Steel Banglez)	2023	Steel Banglez	14	1	3	87	1	1	—	102		Sidhu Moose Wala	The Playlist
"Watch Out" (with Sikander Kahlon)	2023	Mxrci	33	—	11	—	3	2	—	—		Sidhu Moose Wala	Non-album singles
"Drippy" (with AR Paisley & Mxrci)	2024	Mxrci	9	4	11	—	1	1	—	152		Sidhu Moose Wala	Non-album singles
"410" (with Sunny Malton)	2024	Offgrid	43	—	20	—	—	—	—	—		Sunny Malton	Non-album singles
"Attach" (with Fredo and Steel Banglez)	2024	Steel Banglez	40	—	7	—	2	—	—	—		Sidhu Moose Wala	Non-album singles
"Lock" (with the Kidd)	2025	The Kidd	54	12	12	—	—	—	—	—		Sidhu Moose Wala	Non-album singles
"0008"	2025	The Kidd	—	—	27	—	4	—	—	—		Sidhu Moose Wala	Moose Print
"Neal"	2025	Mxcri	—	—	29	—	6	—	—	—		Sidhu Moose Wala	Moose Print
"Take Notes"	2025	JayB	—	—	31	—	—	—	—	—		Sidhu Moose Wala	Moose Print
"Barota"	2025	The Kidd	36	—	1	—	—	—	—	—		Sidhu Moose Wala	Non-album singles
"Eyes on Me"	2026	The Kidd	—	—	—	—	—	—	—	—		Sidhu Moose Wala	Non-album singles
"GhostFace Killah"	2026	Mxrci	—	—	—	—	—	—	—	—		Sidhu Moose Wala	Non-album singles
"Kaali Hoodie" (featuring Bohemia)	2026	The Kidd	69	—	15	—	—	—	—	—		Sidhu Moose Wala	Non-album singles
"Phantom Ferrari" (with Intense)	2026	Intense	—	—	38	—	—	—	—	—			Non-album singles
"—" denotes a recording that did not chart or was not released in that territory.

=== As featured artist ===
Title	Year	Music	Peak chart positions				Label	Album
Title	Year	Music	CAN	NZ Hot	UK Asian	UK Punjabi	Label	Album
"TPM" (Sunny Malton feat. Sidhu Moose Wala)	2017	Byg Byrd	—	—	—	—	Brown Boys Records	
"Homicide" (Big Boi Deep feat. Sunny Malton & Sidhu Moose Wala)	2018	Byg Byrd	—	—	—	—	Sidhu Moose Wala	
"Russian Tank" (Khush Romana feat. Sidhu Moose Wala)	2018	Byg Byrd	—	—	—	—	Humble Music	
"Same Beef" (Bohemia feat. Sidhu Moose Wala)	2019	Byg Byrd	—	—	24	11	Saga Music	
"Cadillac" (Raja Game Changerz feat. Sidhu Moose Wala)	2019	Game Changerz	—	—	—	—	Single Track Studio	
"Old Skool" (Prem Dhillon featuring Sidhu Moose Wala & Nseeb)	2020	The Kidd	—	—	19	8	Sidhu Moose Wala, Sky Digital	
"Taare" (Harlal Batth feat. Sidhu Moose Wala)	2020	Gur Sidhu	—	—	—	—	Sony Music India	
"Paapi" (Rangrez Sidhu feat. Sidhu Moose Wala)	2020	The Kidd	—	—	—	—	Thuglife	
"Game" (Shooter Kahlon featuring Sidhu Moose Wala)	2020	Vipul Kapoor	92	24	24	—	5911 Records	
"22 22" (Gulab Sidhu featuring Sidhu Moose Wala)	2020	Ikwinder Singh (Ikky)	—	23	—	—	5911 Records	
"Chorni" (Divine featuring Sidhu Moose Wala)	2023	Drugs Beats & Mex Manny	27	7	—	—	Divine & Sidhu Moose Wala	Gunehgar
"Dilemma" (Stefflon Don featuring Sidhu Moose Wala)	2024	Guilty Beatz, Steel Banglez	—	34	—	—	Stefflon Don	Island 54

== Soundtrack contributions ==
=== Soundtrack albums ===
Film	Year	Song	Music	Label
Yes I Am Student	2021	"Jaan"	Intense	Tips Punjabi
Yes I Am Student	2021	"Baapu"	Intense	Tips Punjabi
Yes I Am Student	2021	"Athra Style" (with Jenny Johal)	The Kidd	Tips Punjabi
Yes I Am Student	2021	"Yariyaan"	The Kidd	Tips Punjabi
Yes I Am Student	2021	"Saab" (with Gurtaj)	The Kidd	Tips Punjabi
Moosa Jatt	2021	"Jailaan"	The Kidd	Times Music

=== Soundtrack singles ===
Song	Year	Music	Record label	Film
"Dollar"	2018	Byg Byrd	White Hill Music	Daakuan Da Munda
"Dogar"	2019	Snappy	White Hill Music	Teri Meri Jodi
"Jatti Jeone Morh Wargi"	2019	The Kidd	White Hill Music	Ardab Mutiyaran
"Hathyaar"	2019	The Kidd	Geet Mp3	Sikander 2
"Jailan"	2021	The Kidd	Times Music	Moosa Jatt

== Songwriting discography ==
As lyricist (songwriter)
Title	Year	Artist(s)	Music producer	Label	Album
"License"	2016	Ninja	Goldboy	Speed Records	
"Aa Giya Ni Ohi Billo Time"	2017	Deep Jandu	Deep Jandu	Speed Records	
"Hummer"	2017	Elly Mangat feat. Karan Aujla, Deep Jandu	Harj Nagra	Game Killerz Records	YEA Babby
"Cadillac"	2017	Elly Mangat	Game Changerz	Rehaan Production	YEA Babby
"Death"	2017	Elly Mangat	Deep Jandu	Game Killerz Records	YEA Babby
"Godfather"	2017	Sippy Gill	Deep Jandu	Saga Hits	
"Glock"	2018	Sarab Dhillon Ft. Ikky	Ikky/Spin Singh	Gem Tunes	
Double Barrel	2018	Hommi Pabla	Deep Jandu	Humble Music	
"Challenge"	2018	Ninja	Byg Byrd	White Hill Music	
"Yaari Badkaari"	2018	Ninja	Goldboy	Backyard Studios	
"Dhokaa"	2018	Jass Manak	Sharry Nexus	Geet Mp3	Gangland in Motherland soundtrack
Kharku life	2018	Aardee, Channi Nattan	Intense	Singhs Doing Things	As dialogue writer (Uncredited)
"Dil Diyan Gallan"	2018	Preet Balaade Wala	Byg Byrd	Fresh Media Records	
"Violent Street"	2018	Raja Game Changerz	Game Changerz	Los Pro	
"Vaseet"	2018	Dilpreet Dhillon	Money Aujla	Times Music	Ishqaa soundtrack
"Enemies"	2018	Angrej Ali	Deep Jandu	GeetMp3	
"Litt Lyf"	2019	Babbal Rai	Byg Byrd	T-Series	
"Incident"	2019	Robin Sidhu	Jassi X	Aim Punjabi	
"Kyu Ni Dekhda"	2019	Teji Grewal	Mix Singh	Outlaw Record	
"Russian Barrel"	2019	Jasmine Dhiman	R Jay	AR Entertainment	
"Ajj Kal Ve"	2020	Barbie Maan	Preet Hundal	Sidhu Moose Wala	Female version of his track from Snitches Get Stitches
"Kehar"	2020	Kairon Saab	Black Sinper	King Records	

== As executive producer ==
Songs of other artists released under Moose Wala's record label
Song	Year	Artist(s)	Music producer	Notes
"Speak Out"	2019	Raja Game Changerz	Game Changerz	
"Homicide"	2019	Big Boi Deep	Byg Byrd	
"Boot Cut"	2019	Prem Dhillon	San B	
"47 Fellas"	2019	Zane Dhillon	The Kidd	
"Old Skool"	2020	Prem Dhillon, Nseeb & Sidhu Moose Wala	The Kidd	
"Head Up"	2020	Roman Sidhu & Afsana Khan	Beat Inspector	
"Stacks"	2020	Nseeb & Jagga	Vitamin	
"Masla"	2020	Dev Sidhu	Homie Deep	
"Full Flame"	2020	Shooter Kahlon & Sidhu Moose Wala	Vipul Kapoor	Featured in music video
"Black Power"	2020	Sukh Dhindsa & Raja	Game Changerz	
"Jatt Hunde Aa"	2020	Prem Dhillon	San B	
"Muchh"	2020	Veer Sandhu	Jind	
"Tattooz"	2020	Parry Sarpanch & Gurlez Akhtar	Music Empire	
"Ajj Kal Ve" (Female version)	2020	Barbie Maan	Preet Hundal	
"Zindagi"	2020	Rangrez Sidhu Ft. Nseeb	The Kidd	
"Liv In"	2020	Prem Dhillon Ft. Barbie Maan	The Kidd	
"Majha Block"	2020	Prem Dhillon	San B	
"Just a Dream"	2021	Prem Dhillon	Opi Music	
"Prahune"	2021	Prem Dhillon, Amrit Maan	San B	
"Kiwe Kadoge"	2022	Gulab Sidhu	Not Available	
"Siyasat Ch Aa Geya"	2022	Balkar Ankhila, Manjinder Gulshan	Not Available	
"Sajjna Da Khat"	2022	Khuda Baksh	Ikwinder Singh	
"Deal"	2022	Malle ala Guri	Nick Dhammu	

== See also ==
- Sidhu Moose Wala videography
