= Sidhu Moose Wala videography =

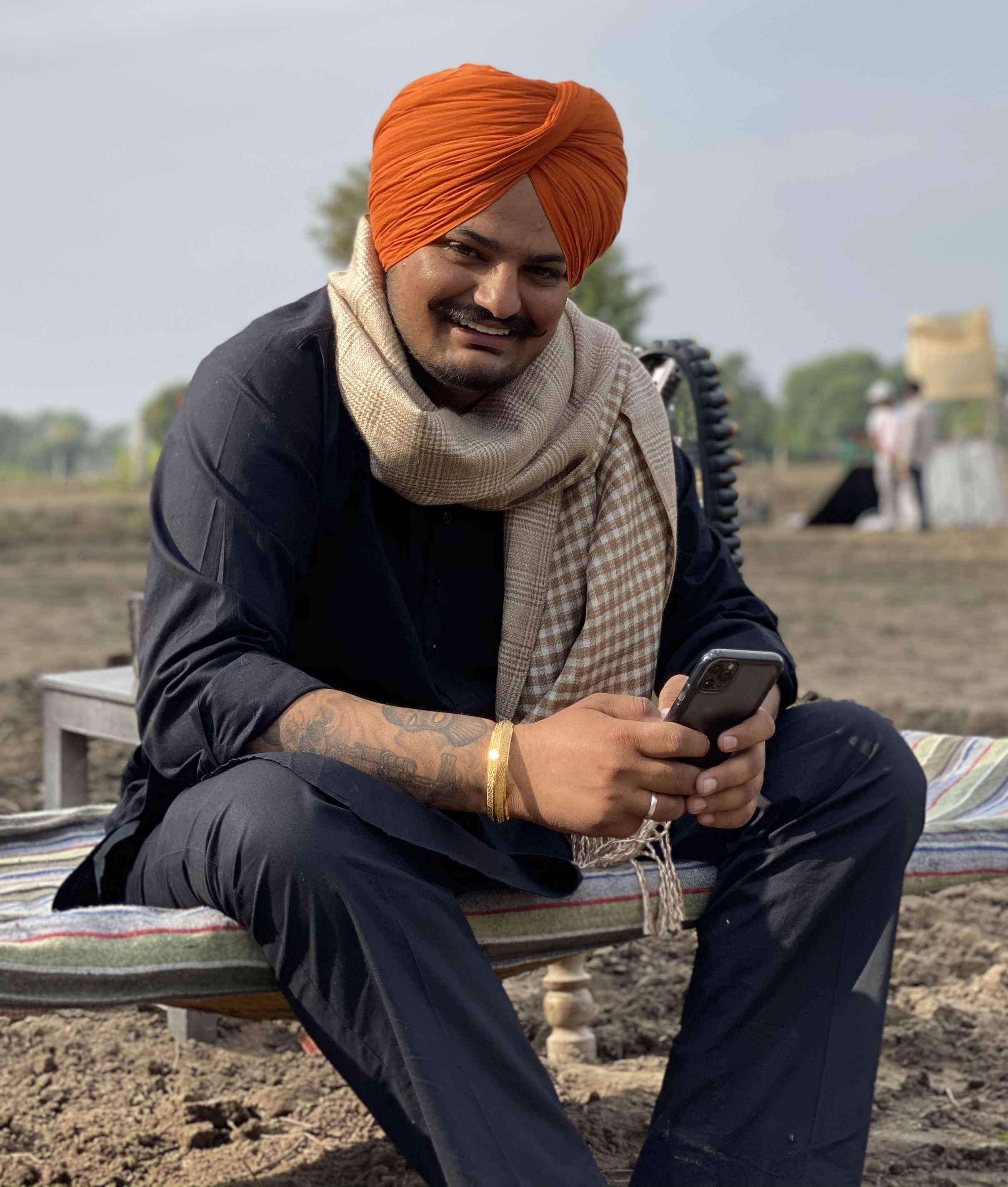
- Sidhu during the shoot of Moose Jatt, 2021
- Film: 3
- Music videos: 75

The following list contains the videography for Sidhu Moose Wala, including his own music videos and videos that feature him. He has released three video albums and has been featured in over thirty music videos.

== Music videos ==
=== As lead artist ===
List of music videos as lead artist, with directors, showing year released
Title	Year	Director(s)
G-Wagon (ft.Deep Jandu)	2017	Film Makers
So High	2017	Pro League Films
Issa Jatt (with Sunny Malton)	2017	Baljit Singh Deo
Just Listen (ft.Sunny Malton)	2018	TDOT FILMS
Its All About You	2018	Baljit Singh Deo
Dark Love	2018	Baljit Singh Deo
Tochan	2018	Tru Makers
Famous	2018	Jashan Nanarh
Dollar	2018	TDOT Films
Jatt Da Muqabla	2018	TDOT Films
Badfella	2018	TDOT Films
I’m Better Now	2018	Teji Sandhu
Outlaw	2019	Teji Sandhu
Legend	2019	Sukaran Pathak & Rupen Bhardwaj
Chosen (ft.Sunny Malton)	2019	Sukaran Pathak & Rupen Bhardwaj
East Side Flow (ft.Sunny Malton)	2019	Teggy
Sidhu's Anthem (ft.Sunny Malton)	2019	Sukaran Pathak & Rupen Bhardwaj
Poison (ft.R-Nait)	2019	Agam Mann & Azeem Mann
Sohne Lagde (ft.The PropheC)	2019	Agam Mann & Azeem Mann
Hathyaar	2019	—
B-Town (ft.Sunny Malton)	2019	Sukaran Pathak & Rupen Bhardwaj
Forget About It (ft.Sunny Malton)	2019	Sukaran Pathak & Rupen Bhardwaj
Dhakka	2019	Agam Mann & Azeem Mann
Tibeyan Da Putt	2020	Hunny Singh & Pulkit Setia
Dear Mama	2020	Hunny Singh & Pulkit Setia
Doctor	2020	Hunny Singh & Pulkit Setia
My Block	2020	Sukaran Pathak & Rupen Bhardwaj
BAD	2020	Tru Makers
Youngest In Charge (ft.Sunny Malton)	2022	Hunny Singh & Pulkit Setia
F*ck Em' All (with Sunny Malton)	2022	Rubbal Gtr Films
The Last Ride	2022	Gurjant Panesar
Levels (ft.Sunny Malton)	2022	Nav Dhiman
Kaali Hoodie (ft. Bohemia)	2026	Tru Makers & Sukaran Pathak

=== As featured artist ===
List of music videos, with directors, showing year released
Title	Year	Director(s)
"Russian Tank" (Khush Romana featuring Sidhu Moose Wala)	2018	Teggy
"Homicide" (Big Boi Deep featuring Sidhu Moose Wala)	2019	Jyothi Tatter
"Same Beef" (Bohemia featuring Sidhu Moose Wala)	2019	Rahul Dutta
"47" (Mist, Stefflon Don featuring Sidhu Moose Wala)	2019	—
"Old-Skool" (Prem Dhillon featuring Nseeb & Sidhu Moose Wala)	2020	TDot Films
"Taare" (Harlal Batth featuring Sidhu Moose Wala)	2020	Sukharan Pathak & Rupen Bhardwaj
"Bambiha Bole" (Amrit Maan featuring Sidhu Moose Wala)	2020	Tru Makers
"Paapi" (Rangrez Sidhu featuring Sidhu Moose Wala)	2020	Rupen Bhardwaj & Sukaran Pathak
"No Worries" (Raja Game Changerz featuring Sidhu Moose Wala)	2020	Inside Motion Pictures
"GAME" Shooter Kahlon featuring Sidhu Moose Wala)	2020	Hunny PK Films
"Bai-Bai" (Gulab Sidhu featuring Sidhu Moose Wala)	2020	Tru Makers
"Satisfy" Shooter Kahlon featuring Sidhu Moose Wala)	2021	Pink Pipe Pictures

=== Cameo appearances ===
List of music videos, with directors, showing year released
Title	Year	Director(s)
"Aa Geya Ni Ohi Billo Time" (Deep Jandu)	2017	Sukh Sanghera
"Gadi Sarkari" (Amrit Sohi)	2017	Gill Dennis
"Devdas 2.0" (Karan Benipal)	2017	Harry Singh & Preet Singh
"Ammunition" (Raja Game Changerz)	2017	Jashan Nanarh
"Cadillac" (Elly Mangat)	2017	Hunny Singh & Preet Singh
"Double Barrel" (Hommi Pabla)	2018	Pro League Films
"Speak Out" (Raja Game Changerz)	2019	Odd Films
"Straight Talk" (Darsh Kamalpurewala)	2019	Harpreet Brar
Nach Nach (Gippy Grewal)	2020	Daas Films
“Tellin’ Me (AR Paisley)	2020	Jyothi Tatter
"Full Flame" (Shooter Kahlon)	2020	—
"Ajj Kal Ve" (Barbie Maan)	2020	Ekager Gill
"Tattoz" (Parry Sarpanch)	2020	Hunny PK Films
"Kehar" (Kairon Saab)	2020	Burning Light Studios
"Brown Munde" (AP Dhillon, Gurinder Gill)	2020	—
"5911" (Jatinder Gagowal)	2021	Big Mafia Films
"Eastender" (Morrisson)	2021	Harry James & Morrisson
"MOH" (Barbie Maan)	2021	Sukh Sanghera

=== Music albums ===
List of music videos as released in music album, with directors, showing year released
Title	Year	Albums	Director(s)
Jatt Da Muqabala	2018	PBX 1	TDot Films
Badfella	2018	PBX 1	TDot Films
I'm Better Now	2019	PBX 1	Teji Sandhu Films
Burberry	2021	Moosetape	Teji Sandhu Films
Unfu*kwithable	2021	Moosetape	Teji Sandhu Films
US	2021	Moosetape	Sukh Sanghera
Brown Shortie	2021	Moosetape	Sukh Sanghera
Me & My Girlfriend	2021	Moosetape	Jashan Nanarh
Signed To God	2021	Moosetape	Raf Sappera
Malwa Block	2021	Moosetape	Hunny Singh & Pulkit Setia
G-Shit	2021	Moosetape	Sukh Sanghera
Calaboose	2021	Moosetape	Tru-Makers
IDGAF	2021	Moosetape	Sukh Sanghera
Power	2021	Moosetape	Sukh Sanghera
GOAT	2021	Moosetape	Sukh Sanghera
Celebrity Killer	2021	Moosetape	Raf Sappera

== Film ==
Key
†	Denotes films that have not yet been released

=== Actor ===
Year	Film	Role	Notes
2019	Teri Meri Jodi	Jeona	Guest appearance
2021	Moosa Jatt	Moosa	Debut film
2021	Yes I Am Student	Jass	
2022	Jattan Da Munda Gaun Lagya		Directed & written by Amberdeep Singh

=== Soundtrack music videos ===
List of music videos released in films, with directors, showing year released
Title	Year	Film	Director(s)
Dollar	2018	Dakuan Da Munda	TDot Films
Hathyar	2019	Sikander 2	—
Dogar	2019	Teri Meri Jodi	Aditya Sood
Jatti Jeone Morh Wargi	2019	Ardab Mutiyaran	Agam Maan & Azeem Maan
