= Manjeet Tattooz =

Indian tattoo artist

- Born: 8 February 1976 (age 49); New Delhi, India
- Occupation: Tattoo artist
- Website: www.manjeettattooz.com

Manjeet Singh (born 8 February 1976), known as Manjeet Tattooz, is an Indian tattoo artist. His work has been featured in Indian and international tattoo conventions and was included in The World Atlas of Tattoos published by Yale University Press.

== Early life ==
Manjeet Singh was born on 8 February 1976 in New Delhi. He began his career in the early 1990s as a hand-painter of Bollywood film posters in New Delhi. He developed an interest in tattooing in the mid-2000s and started working professionally in 2007. He is self-taught artist.

== Career ==
Singh primarily works in black-and-grey realism, portraiture, and spiritual themes, including Sikh iconography. His portfolio includes religious figures, historical personalities, and surrealist designs. One of his tattoos depicting Salvador Dalí was included in The World Atlas of Tattoos. In 2012, Singh was awarded the Best Portrait Tattoo at the International Tattoo Convention held in India. Over the years, he has participated in multiple tattoo expos and conventions, including events in Canada, the United Kingdom, and other countries. He has been invited to demonstrate techniques and engage with artists from different regions.

Singh has worked with several public figures from the Indian entertainment and sports industries. His clients have included singer Mika Singh, actor Amit Tandon, cricketer Harbhajan Singh, hockey player Manpreet Singh and Punjabi artist like Jordan Sandhu, Himanshi Khurana, Byg Byrd, Gulab Sidhu.

He has conducted tattoo workshops and collaborated with regional studios in various cities. These activities have included training sessions on tattoo hygiene, aftercare, and ethical practices. Singh has publicly expressed concern over the absence of industry regulations and has advocated for standardized safety measures and licensing for professional tattoo artists in India.

In 2025, he organized a multi-city tattoo tour across India. The tour included live tattooing sessions, artist collaborations, and public outreach initiatives focused on promoting awareness about safe tattoo practices in Tier 2 and Tier 3 cities.

== Recognition ==
Singh is one of three Indian tattoo artists featured in The World Atlas of Tattoos, published by Yale University Press. He received the Best Portrait Tattoo award at the 2012 International Tattoo Convention in India. He is also reported to hold a Guinness World Record.
