= Mar Gaye Oye Loko =

2018 film directed by Simerjit Singh

Mar Gaye Oye Loko ਮਰ ਗਏ ਓਏ ਲੋਕੋ
- Film poster
- Punjabi: ਮਰ ਗਏ ਓਏ ਲੋਕੋ
- Directed by: Simerjit Singh
- Written by: Gippy Grewal
- Story by: Gippy Grewal
- Produced by: Gippy Grewal
- Starring: Gippy Grewal; Binnu Dhillon; Sapna Pabbi; Jaswinder Bhalla
- Music by: Byg Byrd; Jay K Snappy; Kuwar Virk; Gurmeet Singh; Guru Randhawa
- Production company: Humble Motion Pictures
- Distributed by: Omjee Group
- Release date: 31 August 2018 (India)
- Running time: 117 minutes
- Country: India
- Language: Punjabi
- Box office: ₹190 million (see below)

Mar Gaye Oye Loko is a 2018 Indian-Punjabi language Comedy film directed by Simerjit Singh starring Gippy Grewal, Binnu Dhillon & Sapna Pabbi in lead roles. It is a Punjabi comedy about a simple boy, Tittu (Gippy Grewal), and his journey to finally marry the girl of his dreams, Simran (Sapna Pabbi). She in turn happens to be interested in the local gangster, Gill Baiji (Binnu Dhillon). Gill Baiji gets shot by his arch rival Sidhu (Jaggi Singh) and this event changes Tittu's fate forever. The film has Jaswinder Bhalla, Gurpreet Ghuggi, Karamjit Anmol, B.N. Sharma and Jaggi Singh in supporting roles; it marked the Punjabi debut for Sapna Pabbi.

Mar Gaye Oye Loko’s story was written by Gippy Grewal who had also written Ardaas and Manje Bistre which are all released under his production company Humble Motion Pictures. Gippy Grewal served as writer, producer and actor in the film. In an interview Gippy Grewal disclosed that the role of Gill Baiji played by Binnu Dhillon was written for himself but due to requirements for looks he didn't play the role. Film was shot in Punjab. Soundtrack of film was composed by Kuwar Virk, Jay K, Snappy and Gurmeet Singh.

Mar Gaye Oye Loko was released theatrically on 31 August 2018; it received mixed response from film critics and audience alike. Commercially it performed well at box office and emerged as hit, in its opening weekend. It was able to gross est. ₹99.5 million worldwide and ₹201 million in its whole theatrical run. The film is also the 26th highest grossing Punjabi film of all time and 5th highest grossing Punjabi film of 2018.

== Cast ==
- Gippy Grewal as Tittu
- Binnu Dhillon as Gill Bai
- Sapna Pabbi as Simran
- Raghveer Boli as Moongi
- Jaswinder Bhalla as Yamraj
- Karamjit Anmol as Hakalchu Yamdoot
- Gurpreet Ghuggi as Pardhan
- B.N. Sharma as Doctor
- Jaggi Singh as Sidhu
- Parminder Gill as staff nurse

== Soundtrack ==
Mar Gaye Oye Loko

Soundtrack album by Byg Byrd Kuwar Virk Jay K Snappy Gurmeet Singh
- Released: 2018
- Recorded: 2018
- Genre: Feature film soundtrack
- Length: 19:47 (23:04 in total version length)
- Language: Punjabi
- Label: Humble Music

=== Track list ===
| No. | Title | Lyrics | Music | Singer(s) | Length |
|---|---|---|---|---|---|
| 1. | "Aaja Ni Aaja" | Guru Randhawa | Guru Randhawa; Kuwar Virk | Guru Randhawa | 3:13 |
| 2. | "Mar Gaye Oye Loko" | Malkit Singh | Jay K | Gippy Grewal; Malkit Singh | 3:01 |
| 3. | "So High" | Sidhu Moose Wala | Byg Byrd | Sidhu Moose Wala | 3:34 |
| 4. | "Fuel" | Rav Hanjra | Snappy | Gippy Grewal | 2:34 |
| 5. | "Mithade Boli" | Kuldeep Kandiara | Gurmeet Singh | Karamjit Anmol | 3:24 |
| 6. | "Rabba Ve" | Vinder Nathumajra | Jay K | Rahat Fateh Ali Khan | 3:41 |
| 7. | "Lagda Khair Nahin" | Happy Raikoti | Gurmeet Singh | Gippy Grewal | 3:17 |
| Total length: | | | | | 22:44 |

== Releases ==
Gippy Grewal immediately after success of Subedar Joginder Singh announced film on day of Baisakhi. Mar Gaye Oye Loko's official teaser was released on 15 July 2018 & official trailer was released on 13 August 2018. Film was released worldwide on 31 August 2018. Mar Gaye Oye Loko was edited by Rohit Dhiman and its final cut ran for approximately 117 minutes. The film was produced by Gippy Grewal's production house Humble Motion Pictures. The international distribution rights for the project were acquired by the Mumbai-based production and distribution house, Rising Star Entertainment Ltd. Mar Gaye Oye Loko was also released in Pakistan on 7 September 2018.

== Reception ==
=== Box office ===
Mar Gaye Oye Loko grossed est. ₹18 million on its opening day from India which makes it eighth highest opening ever for a Punjabi and third best opening of 2018 but it was far away from their last release Carry On Jatta 2. In its opening weekend Mar Gaye Oye Loko giving tough competition to Bollywood film Stree in overseas grossed ₹70.1 million from India, ₹6351,000 from United States, ₹10.2 million from Canada, ₹6.9 million at Australia, ₹3.9 million from UK and ₹1930,000 from New Zealand. After second weekend, the numbers were grown at overseas and domestic. The film raked est. ₹11 crores from India, ₹1.31 crore from United States, ₹1.91 crore from Canada, ₹69.52 lacs from United Kingdom & Ireland, ₹1.1 crores from Australia and ₹29.6 lacs from New Zealand. In its third week the film faced a small drop in collections. The film had collected ₹14.3 million in United States, ₹37.1 million in Canada, ₹7996,000 in United Kingdom, ₹11.9 million in Australia and ₹3159,000 in New Zealand till its third weekend.

=== Critical reception ===
Mar Gaye Oye Loko received mixed reviews from different websites. According to reviewers the new experiment doesn't met expectations. However, the attempt is feeble, perhaps justifying balance between films as a medium of entertainment, and that of social messages.

Jaspreet Nijher of Times Of India reviewed Mar Gaye Oye Loko by giving 2.5 critic's rating out of 5. About the comedy, reviewer said, "The famous five of Punjabi comedy- Binnu Dhillon, Jaswinder Bhalla, Karmjit Anmol, BN Sharma and Gurpreet Ghuggi, manage to helm the film's comic timing and lift it out to its true genre of a romcom." Criticising dilemma made in film reviewer said, "Straddling this dilemma costs the film its comic dose as the director juggled his two themes. The film is also lampooning singers like Sidhu Moose Wala’s violent songs, Parmish Verma's infamous shooting incident to bridge this dilemma whereas music, given by Rahar Fateh Ali Khan and Guru Randhawa, saves the day, being refreshing and soulful." Reviewer appreciates the work of Sapna Pabbi, saying, "TV actress, Sapna Pabbi (who plays Simran), is just another pretty addition to Punjabi cinema, perfectly towing the precedence of being only a dolled-up prop to the script."

Reviewer of website BookMyShow praised the direction work of Simerjit Singh, saying, "Simerjit Singh's direction has its trademark humor and it works for most parts of the film. He is better off in emotional and romantic scenes." Reviewer also praised the script written by Gippy Grewal whereas criticized the dialogues, saying, "At times, the characters try too hard to make you laugh. The dialogues also seem forced at places." On last added, "On the whole, Mar Gaye Oye Loko is a fun, clean film that works despite the over-the-top comedy. It takes funny jibes at death and the afterlife and that's where the film succeeds. Do not compare it with Carry on Jatta 2 or expect the same team to deliver a similar laughathon and you would enjoy the film thoroughly."
