= Snitches Get Stitches =

Mixtape by Sidhu Moose Wala
- Released: 9 May 2020
- Genre: Hip hop; R&B; gangsta rap; trap
- Length: 28:35
- Language: Punjabi
- Label: Sidhu Moose Wala
- Producer: Intense; Byg Byrd; Snappy; Nick Dhammu; Gur Sidhu; The Kidd

Sidhu Moose Wala chronology
PBX 1 (2018)	Snitches Get Stitches (2020)	Moosetape (2021)
External audio
- Audio Jukebox on YouTube

Singles from Snitches Get Stitches
- 1. "Roti" Released: 5 May 2020; 2. "Baapu"

Snitches Get Stitches is the debut and solo mixtape by singer-rapper Sidhu Moose Wala. The mixtape is a compilation of songs that were released on SoundCloud or leaked on the internet, as well as new songs. It was self-released on 9 May 2020, without prior announcement. Production was handled by Intense, Byg Byrd, Snappy, Nick Dhammu, Gur Sidhu, Amar Sandhu, and The Kidd. A featured guest appearance included Amar Sandhu, but the track was later removed.

Later, in the year 2021, the song "Baapu" was re-released on the Yes I Am Student soundtrack.

== Background ==
Due to the dispute over the release of song "My Block", Brown Boyz disbanded and some tracks were leaked online.

Sidhu announced the album on his Instagram handle and released it on all platforms the same day. The album was branded as a mixtape composed of some new and previously leaked tracks.

== Track listing ==
All lyrics are written by Sidhu Moose Wala.

No.	Title	Music	Length
1.	"Ajj Kal Ve"	Nick Dhammu	3:24
2.	"Baapu"	Intense	6:07
3.	"When I Am Gone"	Gur Sidhu	2:07
4.	"Pittal"	Byg Byrd	1:26
5.	"Boss"	Snappy	3:08
6.	"Goat"	Byg Byrd	1:21
7.	"Roti"	The Kidd	3:11
8.	"Confession"	Intense	2:22
Total length:			22:58

Notes

- "Roti" is titled as "Roti Chaldi" on Youtube.
- "Flop Song" featuring Amar Sandhu was released, but later removed from all platforms.
- On Music platforms "Cadillac" was included and later removed.
