= Moosa, Mansa district =

Village in Punjab India

Moosa
- Village
- Location in Punjab, India Moosa (India)
- Coordinates: 29.98°N 75.32°E
- Country: India
- State: Punjab (India)
- District: Mansa

Government
  - Type: Panchayat
  - Body: Moosa Panchayat
  - Sarpanch: Charan Kaur Sidhu
- Elevation: 696 m (2,283 ft)

Population (2011)
  - Total: 3,742
- Time zone: UTC+5:30 (IST)
- PIN: 151505
- STD code: 01652
- Vehicle registration: PB-31

Moosa is a village in the Mansa district of the Indian state of Punjab.

== Notable people ==
- Sidhu Moose Wala, a Punjabi singer and rapper whose stage name references the village of Moosa where he was born.
