= Daana Paani (2018 film) =

2018 Punjabi Movie

- Theatrical release poster
- Directed by: Tarnvir Singh Jagpal
- Written by: Jass Grewal
- Screenplay by: Jass Grewal
- Story by: Jass Grewal
- Produced by: Nanokey studio Gk entertainment and Tarn Jagpal Films
- Starring: Jimmy Sheirgill; Simi Chahal; Gurpreet Ghuggi; Nirmal Rishi; Kanika Mann; Tarsem Jassar
- Narrated by: Nirmal Rishi
- Cinematography: Ravi Kumar Sana
- Edited by: Manish More
- Music by: Jaidev Kumar
- Production companies: Nanokey Studios; GK Entertainment; Cam Art Films And Tarn Jagpal Films Manbir singh sandhu
- Distributed by: Omjee Group
- Release date: 4 May 2018 (India)
- Country: India
- Language: Punjabi

Daana Paani is a 2018 Indian-Punjabi family drama film directed by Tarnvir Singh Jagpal and stars Jimmy Sheirgill and Simi Chahal in lead roles. The film is written by Jass Grewal and is produced by Nanokey Studios and GK Entertainment in association with Tarn Jagpal films and Cam Art Films. The film plots the story of Basant Kaur, who lost her father when she was young and her mother is also separated from her. The film also features Gurpreet Ghuggi, Nirmal Rishi, Kanika Mann and Nikeet Dhillon in supporting roles. The film was released worldwide on 4 May 2018.

== Plot ==
Basant Kaur wrote an autobiography novel titled as “Daana Paani”. Some reporters approached her for an interview and hence she started narrating her story.

When she was young she had a happy family. One day, her father suffers a fatal snakebite while saving his brother. Her father's death brought many problems and difficulties for her and her mother. Her aunts began to mistreat them. After watching this her maternal grandfather took his daughter (Basant's mother) back to his home and decided to marry her off again. Basant's grandfather made a condition to them that Basant will live at her paternal home and not with her mother. Panchayat agreed with them and gave permission to marry Basant's mother again and separated her from Basant. Also, for their relation allowed her to visit her mother once in six months.

Her mother was married in the village Khiwa. After six months, Basant's aunt taught her to say that she doesn't want to meet her mother. Therefore, she couldn't meet her mother and was separated from her forever. Later, her grandfather thought he should marry her off as well as he could die anytime and can't trust his family members to take care of her after him. And coincidentally, she is married to Mehtaab Singh in a village where her in-laws will be neighbours to her mother. It instilled a hope in her that she will meet her mother again and she was happy to get married there. And when she would grow up they would send her there.

After many years, there were two Mehtaab Singh's in army also the names of their villages were also same. One of them was whom to Basant Kaur was married dies during the war with China. And other Mehtaab Singh was sent to the first one's house to get Basant Kaur's signature for army work. And from his home he learnt that Muklawa had yet to come and yet she lives in her village Ahlowal. And he then goes to Ahlowal, there he met Basant but his intent is still unknown in the village as Basant's cousin asks him to keep the death a secret as there is a wedding in the family.

He gets mistaken for Basant's husband Mehtaab and cousin brother requests him to pretend so that his Basant can finally have some happiness in her life. While, on other hand, Basant's aunt asks Mehtaab to marry Basant and he unwillingly agrees. But when marriage was supposed to happen Bheem Singh saw it and tells the truth to other family members. All this leads to chaos and Basant's uncles trying to kill Mehtaab but Basant's cousin Bahadur Singh convinces everyone on behalf of Basant's life and what has happened to her in whole life and he succeeds. Basant is married to Mehtaab Singh.

In next scene, Mehtaab and Basant come to Kheewa, Mehtaab's village and when the door opens it is the Basant's mother who is performing the rituals, Basant identifies her and both reconcile after a long time. Later, Basant lives with her mother for the rest of her life, she has a daughter named Seerat who is in Canada and Mehtaab also died a year earlier who inspired her to write an autobiography. Basant died with a heart attack while narrating the story. She then meets her parents in heaven along with Mehtaab.

== Cast ==
- Jimmy Sheirgill as Mehtaab Singh
- Simi Chahal as Basant Kaur
  - Nirmal Rishi as old age Basant Kaur
- Kanika Mann as Maghi Basant's Cousin
- Gurpreet Ghuggi as Master Bahadur Singh
- Gurmeet Saajan as Sepoy Bheem Singh
- Raj Dhaliwal as Gurdev Kaur- Basant's Mother
- Siddhi Rathore as Young Basant
- Malkeet Rauni as Basant's uncle
- Harby Sangha as Modan Shopkeeper
- Mahabir Bhullar as Numberdaar Kashmira Singh
- Tarsem Paul as Basant's Taaya
- Seema Kaushal as Paalo Basant's Bhua
- Rupinder Rupi as Basant's Aunt
- Jagdish Papra as Basant's Maama
- Balwinder Begowal as Basant's Daadi
- Anita Meet as Basant's Naani
- Tarsem Jassar as Army Officer(Cameo)

== Reception ==
=== Box office ===
The film had a fair opening in India and other territories. Running with Avengers: Infinity War and 102 Not Out, it collected ₹0.5 crores in India on its opening day and approximately ₹2 crores (domestic) in its first weekend and ₹3.9 crores (worldwide). Film has grossed $201,763 in Australia, $60,307 in New Zealand and $22,367 in Great Britain.

== Soundtrack ==
No.	Title	Lyrics	Singer(s)	Length
1.	"Daana Paani"	Bir Singh	Amrinder Gill	2:36
2.	"Rabb Khair Kare"	Veet Baljit	Prabh Gill,Shipra Goyal	3:04
3.	"Maavan"	Veet Baljit	Harbhajan Maan	3:57
4.	"Refugee"	Veet Baljit	Manmohan Waris	3:51
5.	"Daana Paani"	Tarsem Jassar	Tarsem Jassar	1:39
6.	"Kanda Kacheya Ne"	Jass Grewal	Jyotica TangriTarnvir Singh Jagpal	2:10
Total length:				17:17
