= Mera Na =

Single by Sidhu Moose Wala, Steel Banglez and Burna Boy
- Language: Punjabi; English
- Released: 7 April 2023
- Genre: Hip hop
- Length: 3:16
- Label: Sidhu Moose Wala
- Songwriters: Sidhu Moose Wala; Burna Boy
- Producer: Steel Banglez

Sidhu Moose Wala singles chronology
"Vaar" (2022)	"Mera Na" (2023)	"Chorni" (2023)

"Mera Na" is a song by Indian rapper-singer Sidhu Moose Wala, British musician Steel Banglez and Nigerian rapper-singer Burna Boy. It was released as a single on 7 April 2023, in memory of Moose Wala. The song was produced by Steel Banglez, and written by Moose Wala and Burna Boy.

== Commercial performance ==
Within fifteen minutes of release, the song gained more than one million views on YouTube.

== Credits and personnel ==
- Sidhu Moose Wala, Burna Boy – songwriting
- Steel Banglez, JB & A-Singh – production
- Navkaran Brar – video director

== Charts ==
Chart performance for "Mera Na"
Chart (2023)	Peak position
Canada (Canadian Hot 100)	14
Global Excl. US (Billboard)	102
New Zealand Hot Singles (RMNZ)	2
UK Singles (OCC)	87
UK Indie (OCC)	27
