= Barbie Maan =

Indian singer (born 1997)

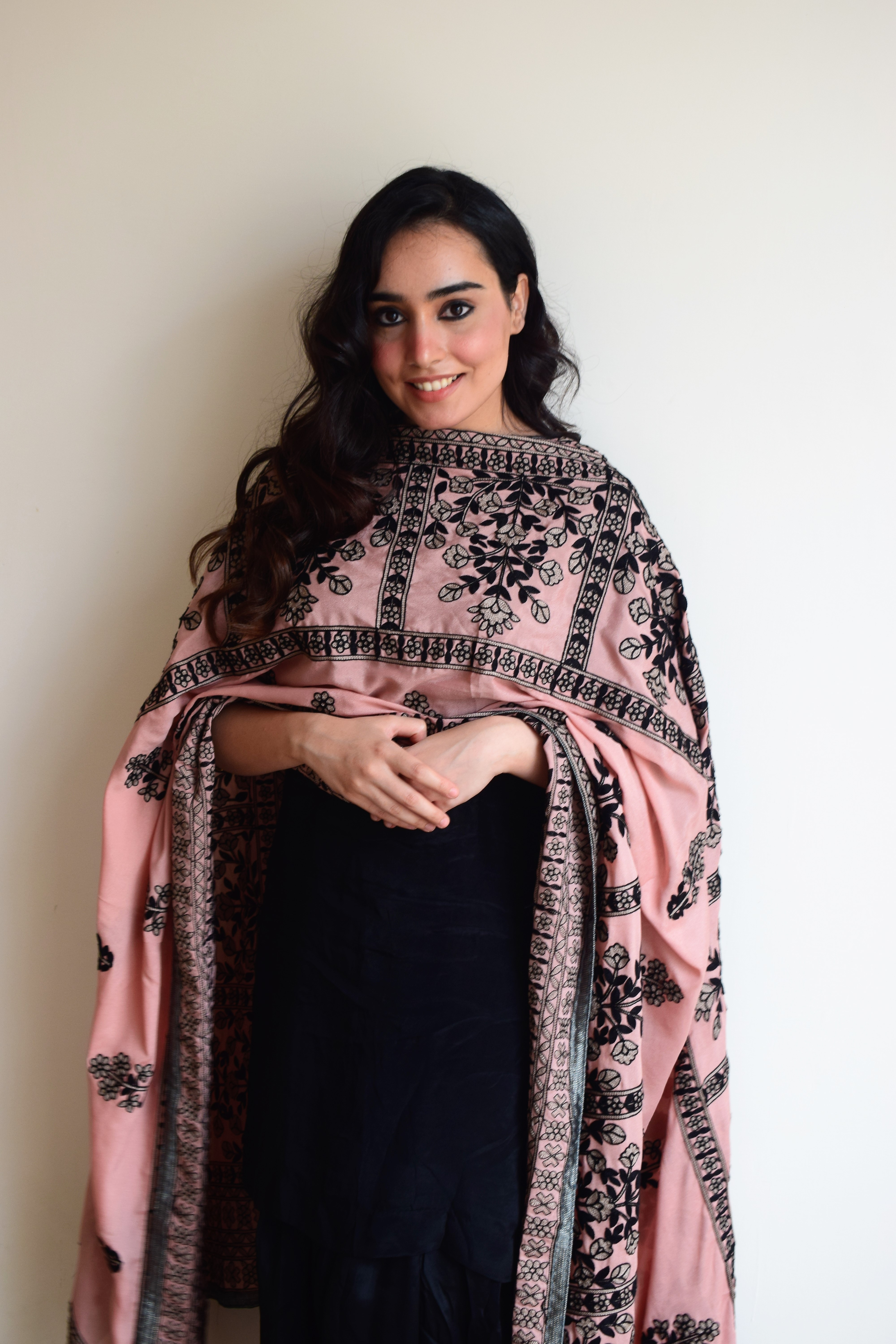

Background information
- Also known as: Barbie Maan
- Born: Jasmeet Kaur Maan; 29 September 1997 (age 29); Firozpur, Punjab
- Genres: Punjabi; Bhangra; Pop
- Occupation: Singer
- Instrument: Vocals
- Years active: 2018–present
- Label: Gold Media Records
- Website: Barbie Maan on Facebook, Barbie Maan on Instagram

Jasmeet Kaur Maan, better known as Barbie Maan, is an Indian singer associated with Punjabi music. Maan is best known for singles "Teri Gali" written by Guru Randhawa. Her songs "Lambarghinii" and "Ajj Kal Ve" featuring Sidhu Moosewala, were responsible for her breakout in the mainstream Punjabi music scene.

== Music career ==
Born in Firozpur, Punjab, Maan started her music career with single "Meriyan Saheliyan", which released in August 2018. In June 2020, she finally got her breakthrough with single "Ajj Kal Ve", released by Sidhu Moose Wala. In June 2020, her single "Teri Gali" was released, which was written by Guru Randhawa and featured Asim Riaz in the music video. The song was viewed over 29 Million times within 1 month of its release on YouTube. On UK Asian music chart by BBC, the song entered Top 30, and became Maan's first song to reach the chart.

== Discography ==
=== Singles ===
Title	Year	Peak chart position							Music	Lyrics	Ref.	Album
Title	Year	UK Asian (OCC)	UK Punjabi (OCC)	YouTube charts					Music	Lyrics	Ref.	Album
Title	Year	UK Asian (OCC)	UK Punjabi (OCC)	Global	AUS	CAN	IN	NZ	Music	Lyrics	Ref.	Album
"Meriyan Saheliyan"	2018	—	—	—	—	—	—	—	Preet Hundal	Preet Hundal		
"Akhiyan"	2019	—	—	—	—	—	—	—	Preet Hundal	Preet Hundal		
"Ajj Kal Ve"	2020	—	—	—	—	—	49	33	Preet Hundal	Sidhu Moose Wala		
"Teri Gali"	2020	6	6	—	—	78	17	—	Vee Music	Guru Randhawa		
"Liv In"(with Prem Dhillon)	2020	30	—	—	54	15	51	24	The Kidd	Prem Dhillon		
"Cute Jeha"(featuring Dilpreet Dhillon)	2020	—	—	—	—	—	—	—	Sharry Nexus	Kirat Gill		
"Jaan"(featuring Shree Brar)	2020	—	—	—	—	—	—	—	Preet Hundal	Shree Brar		
"Suit"	2020	—	—	—	—	—	—	—	Mista Baaz	Kaptaan		
"Viah"	2021	—	—	—	—	—	—	—	Sharry Nexus	Micheal		
"Pyaar"	2021									The Kidd	Gill Raunta	Yes I Am Student (soundtrack)
"Badmashi"	2022								Mxrci	Kaptaan		
