= Vaar (song) =

Single by Sidhu Moose Wala
- Language: Punjabi
- Released: 8 November 2022
- Genre: Punjabi folk; hip hop
- Length: 2:21
- Label: Sidhu Moose Wala
- Songwriter: Sidhu Moose Wala
- Producer: Snappy

Sidhu Moose Wala singles chronology
"SYL" (2022)	"Vaar" (2022)	"Mera Na" (2023)

Music video
- "Vaar" on YouTube

"Vaar" is a single written and performed by singer-rapper Sidhu Moose Wala. The song was released on YouTube on Guru Nanak Gurpurab of 2022 as a posthumous single as a tribute to the slain Sikh General who is credited to be the only person in modern history to conquer, divide and consolidate the heart of the Pashtuns, the Khyber Pass and the Afghan capital; Hari Singh Nalwa.

== Credits and personnel ==
- Sidhu Moose Wala – songwriting
- Snappy – production
- Rass – mixing and engineering
- Navkaran Brar – artwork

== Charts ==
Weekly chart performance for "Vaar"
Chart (2022)	Peak position
Canada (Canadian Hot 100)	64
India (Billboard)	5
New Zealand Hot Singles (RMNZ)	19
UK Asian (Official Charts Company)	1
