= SYL (song) =

Single by Sidhu Moose Wala
- Language: Punjabi
- Released: 23 June 2022
- Genre: Hip hop; political hip hop
- Length: 4:09
- Label: Sidhu Moose Wala
- Songwriter: Sidhu Moose Wala
- Producer: Mxrci

Sidhu Moose Wala singles chronology
"Levels" (2022)	"SYL" (2022)	"Vaar" (2022)

Music video
- "SYL" on YouTube

"SYL" is a single by Punjabi singer-rapper Sidhu Moosewala. The song was released just under three weeks after his death on 29 May 2022. The song was produced by Mxrci, and written by Moose Wala.

== Lyrical content ==
In the song, Sidhu speaks about issues related to the Satluj Yamuna link canal (SYL canal), a contentious issue of sharing of river waters between Haryana, Punjab and Delhi, along with unity among Punjab & Haryana (undivided Punjab after PEPSU merger). The song also calls for the release of Sikh political prisoners who are languishing in jails. In third verse, Sidhu talks about the 2021 Indian farmers' Republic Day protest.

== Music video ==
The video opens with an interview of Aam Aadmi Party member Sushil Gupta. A portion from a speech delivered by Satya Pal Malik in Global Jat Summit on 8 November, 2021 is included as an outro snippet.

== Censorship ==
After three days of release, the song was blocked from YouTube India by the government on 26 June.

== Commercial performance ==
Within one hour of release, song gained more than one million views on YouTube.

"SYL" debuted at number 81 on the Canadian Hot 100 chart.

== Credits and personnel ==
- Sidhu Moose Wala – songwriting
- Mxrci – production
- PixlPxl – mixing and engineering
- Navkaran Brar – artwork

== Charts ==
Weekly chart performance for "SYL"
Chart (2022)	Peak position
Australia (ARIA)	81
Canada (Canadian Hot 100)	27
Global Excl. US (Billboard)	200
India (Billboard)	3
New Zealand Hot Singles (RMNZ)	13
UK Asian (Official Charts Company)	1
