= Shooter Kahlon =

Indian singer and lyricist

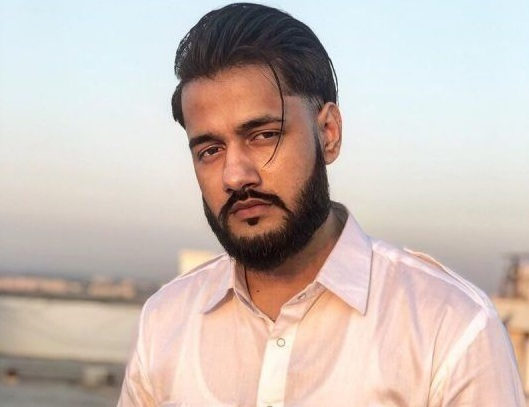

Background information
- Origin: Nawanshahr, Punjab, India
- Genres: Punjabi
- Occupation: Singer • lyricist
- Years active: 2020—present
- Labels: 5911 Records • Sidhu Moose Wala • Juke Dock

Shooter Kahlon is an Indian singer and lyricist associated with the Punjabi music industry. He started his singing career with the "Galaaman" song from the 2022 film Shooter. on 17 April 2020, his single "Full Flame" was released which featured Sidhu Moose Wala. In the same year he released the song "Game" featuring Sidhu Moose Wala. The song has been viewed over 147 million on YouTube as of May 2023.

== Early life ==
Kahlon was born in the early 1990s into a middle-class family in Kahlon village, Nawanshahr, Punjab, India.

== Discography ==
Year	Song	Singer	Label	Ref.
2020	Galaaman	Shooter Kahlon	Geet MP3	
2020	Full Flame	Shooter Kahlon	Sidhu Moose Wala	
2020	Game	Sidhu Moose Wala, Shooter Kahlon	5911 Records	
2021	Satisfy	Shooter Kahlon, Sidhu Moose Wala	5911 Records	
2021	Skookum	Shooter Kahlon	5911 Records	
2021	Touchwood	Shooter Kahlon	5911 Records	
2021	Dear Mama 2	Shooter Kahlon	5911 Records	
2022	Taur Tappa	Shooter Kahlon	Shooter Kahlon	
2023	Front	Shooter Kahlon	Juke Dock	
2023	Stick Talk	Shooter Kahlon	SagaHits	
