= Tarnvir Singh Jagpal =

Indian Punjabi film director

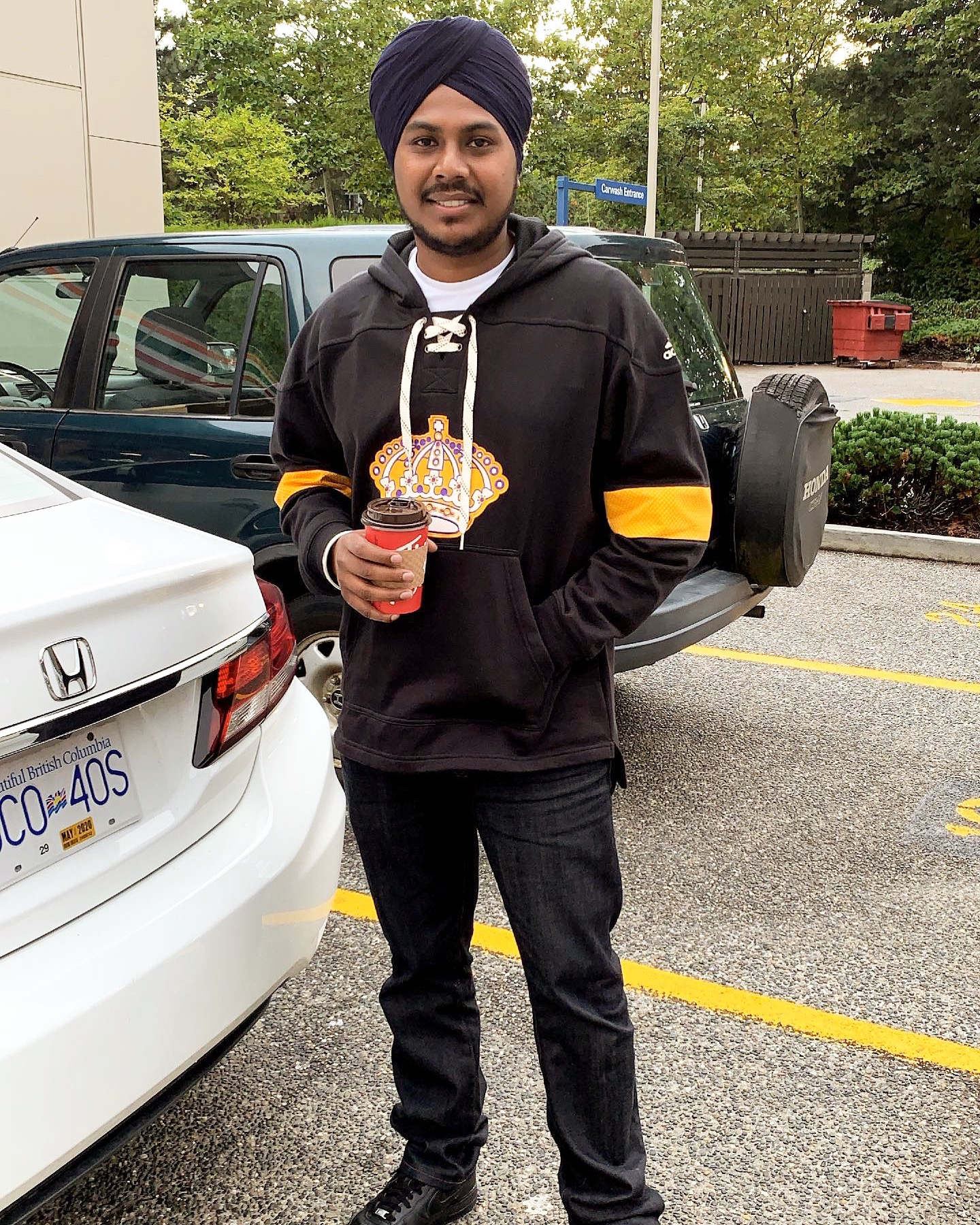
- Tarnvir Singh Jagpal recently in Canada
- Born: Tarnvir Singh Jagpal; 2 November; Punjab, India
- Other name: Tarn Jagpal
- Occupations: Film director, Writer and producer
- Years active: 2010–present
- Known for: Tarn Jagpal Films

Tarnvir Singh Jagpal is an Indian film director. He is known for his work in Punjabi Cinema. He made his directing debut with the movie Rabb Da Radio, for which he received a Filmfare Best Film (critics) Award.

== Career ==
Singh started his career as an assistant director with the movies Taur Mittran Di, Tu Mera 22 Main Tera 22, Romeo Ranjha, Rangeelay, Singh vs Kaur, Ishq Garaari and Saadi Love Story.

In 2017, he directed the movie Rabb Da Radio, for which he received a Filmfare Award. In 2018, he directed the movie Daana Paani.

== Filmography ==
Year	Film	Director	Producer	Writer	Language
2026	Chaali Din	Yes			Punjabi
2024	Ucha Dar Babe Nanak Da	Yes	Yes	Yes	Punjabi
2021	Yes I Am Student	Yes	Yes		Punjabi
2018	Daana Pani	Yes	Yes		Punjabi
2017	Rabb Da Radio	Yes			Punjabi

== Awards and nominations ==
	Movie	Award	Category	Result	Ref.
2018	Rabb Da Radio	Filmfare Awards	Best Film (critics)	Won	
2018	Rabb Da Radio	Brit Asia Punjabi Film Awards	Best Director	Nominated	
2019	Daana Pani	Brit Asia Punjabi Film Awards	Best Director	Nominated	
2019	Daana Pani	PTC Punjabi Film Awards	Best Director	Nominated	
