= Sidhu Moose Wala =

Indian rapper and singer (1993–2022)

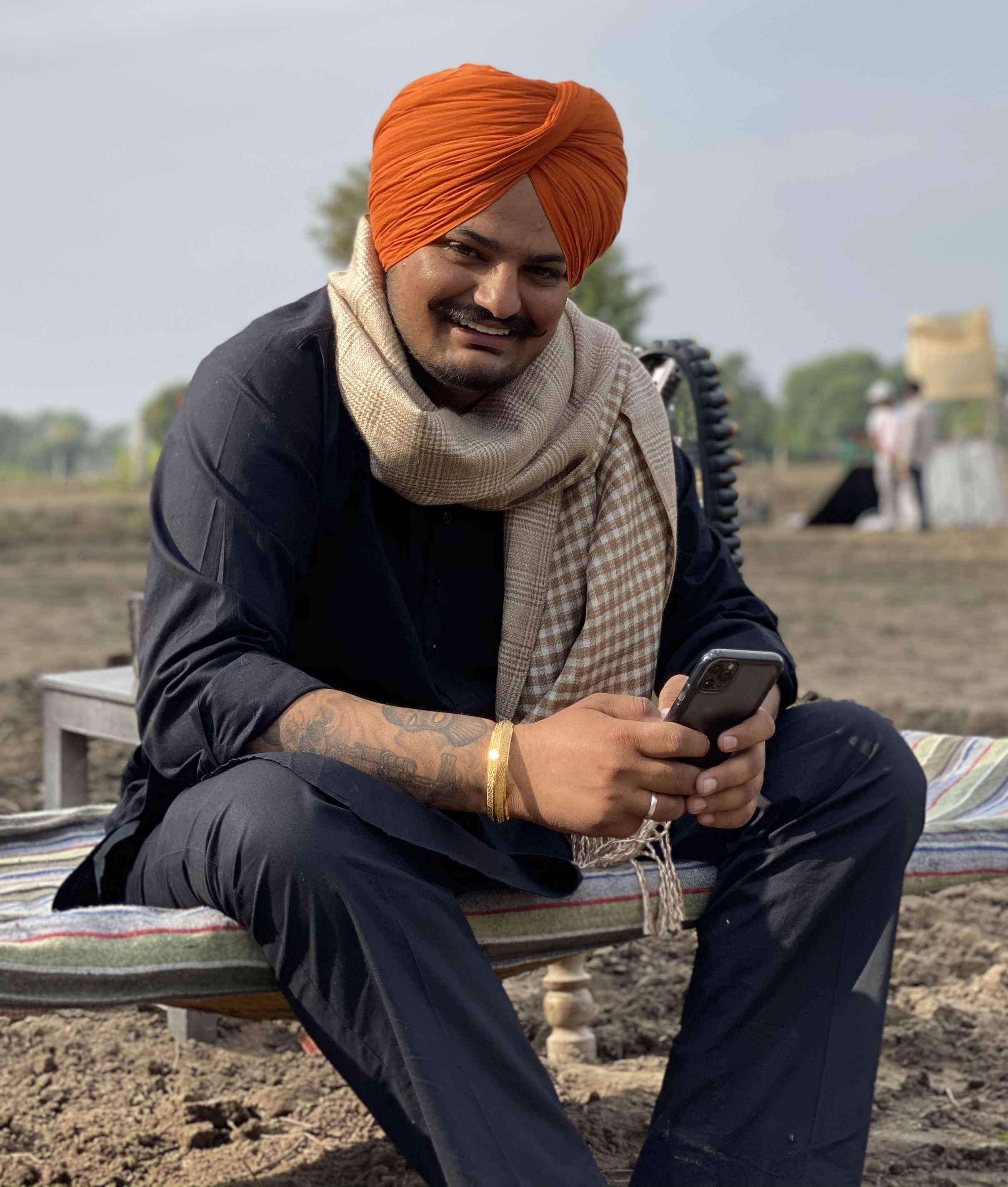
- Moose Wala in 2020
- Born: Shubhdeep Singh Sidhu; 11 June 1993; Moosa, Punjab, India
- Died: 29 May 2022 (aged 28); Jawharke, Punjab, India
- Cause of death: Assassination by gunshots
- Other name: 5911
- Education: Guru Nanak Dev Engineering College, Ludhiana (B.Tech)
- Occupations: Rapper; singer; songwriter; actor; politician
- Years active: 2016–2022
- Works: Discography; filmography; videography
- Political party: Indian National Congress (2021–22)
- Musical career
- Origin: Punjab, India; Brampton, Ontario, Canada
- Genres: Hip hop; gangsta rap; trap; hardcore hip hop; R&B
- Labels: Sidhu Moose Wala; 5911 Records; Humble Music; T-Series
- Formerly of: Brown Boys
- Past members: Sunny Malton; Byg Byrd; Big Boi Deep
- Website: sidhumoosewala.net

Shubhdeep Singh Sidhu (11 June 1993 – 29 May 2022), known professionally as Sidhu Moose Wala, was an Indian singer and rapper. Working predominantly in Punjabi-language music and cinema, Moose Wala is considered to be one of the most influential and successful Punjabi rappers of all time and to many, among the greatest Indian musicians of his generation. Moose Wala's lyrics and themes promoting gun culture and violence were often seen as controversial in India. Subsequently, he had faced legal challenges for his support of gun culture and his inflammatory lyrics.

Born in Moosa, Punjab, Moose Wala began his career in 2016 as a songwriter for the song "License" by Ninja, and as lead artist in 2017 with Gurlez Akhtar for a duet song, "G Wagon". Following his debut, he collaborated with Brown Boyz for various tracks. Moose Wala's tracks peaked on the UK Asian Music chart. His song "Bambiha Bole" was among the top five on the Global YouTube music chart. In 2021, he released Moosetape, tracks from which charted globally including on the Billboard Global 200, Billboard Global Excl. US, Canadian Hot 100, UK Asian, and New Zealand Hot charts. He has the most number-one singles on the Billboard India Songs chart. It became the first Indian album to have more than 1 billion streams on Spotify.

Moose Wala rose to mainstream popularity with his track "So High". In 2018, he released his debut album PBX 1, which peaked at number 66 on the Billboard Canadian Albums chart. His singles "47" and "Mera Na" were ranked on the UK Singles Chart. In 2020, Moose Wala was named by The Guardian among 50 up and coming artists. He also became the first Indian singer to perform at Wireless Festival and won four awards at the Brit Asia TV Music Awards.

In 2021, Moose Wala joined the Indian National Congress (INC) political party and unsuccessfully contested the 2022 Punjab Legislative Assembly election for Mansa.

Moose Wala was assassinated on 29 May 2022 by unidentified assailants. Members of the Lawrence Bishnoi gang claimed responsibility for the killing, which the police said was the culmination of an inter-gang rivalry. On 23 June 2022, his first posthumous single, "SYL", was released.

== Early life ==
Sidhu Moose Wala was born Shubhdeep Singh Sidhu on 11 June 1993 in the village of Moosa in the Mansa District of Punjab, India to Balkaur Singh and his mother is Charan Kaur, members of the Jat Sikh community.

Moose Wala studied at Guru Nanak Dev Engineering College, Ludhiana and graduated with a degree in electrical engineering in 2016. He admired and was influenced by rapper Tupac Shakur. He started listening to hip-hop music as a student in sixth grade, and was trained in music by Harvinder Bittu in Ludhiana. According to statements he made while campaigning, he chose Sidhu Moose Wala (Punjabi: ਸਿੱਧੂ ਮੂਸੇ ਵਾਲਾ, lit. 'Sidhu from Moosa') for his stage name as a tribute to his home village of Moosa.

After graduation, Moose Wala moved to Canada as an international student. He studied at Humber College in Brampton, Ontario. (Note: While Sheridan College says it does not possess any records of his enrollment, some news sources reported that he attended Sheridan College. (See: Rana, Uday (9 June 2022). "Punjabi-Canadian rap star Sidhu Moose Wala 'was our Tupac'". The Globe and Mail. "Sheridan says it has no record of his enrolment."))

== Career ==
=== 2017–2018: Rise to fame ===
Moose Wala released his first song "G Wagon" in 2017 while living in Brampton. Later that year, he had his breakthrough with the song "So High", a gangster rap with music producer Byg Byrd. The song won him the 2017 Best Lyricist award at the Brit Asia TV Music Awards. Following this, he joined Brown Boys Records along with Sunny Malton and Byg Byrd.

He began to perform live shows in India in 2018, and performed numerous shows in Canada. He continued his success with singles like "Issa Jatt", "It's All About You", and "Just Listen". In May 2018, he released the single "Tochan", followed by "Famous" which entered the UK Asian Top 40 Chart.

At the 2018 PTC Punjabi Music Awards, he was nominated for the Best New Age Sensation award for "Issa Jatt". In August 2018, he released his first film soundtrack song, "Dollar", for the film Dakuaan Da Munda.

Following various successful songs with music publisher Humble Music, he began releasing songs independently in 2018, starting with "Warning Shots", a diss track targeting Karan Aujla's track "Lafaafe".

In October 2018, he released his debut album PBX 1 under T-Series, in the pop music genre with hip-hop influences. The album charted on the Billboard Canadian Albums chart, and won the Best Album Award at the 2019 Brit Asia TV Music Awards. The album was followed by the release of most of his tracks under his own label, as well as tracks from other artists.

=== 2019–2022: Established singer ===
In February 2019 Moose Wala released "Legend" under his own record label, and it won the Brit Asia TV Kuflink Best Track of the Year Award that year. In the same month, he released "Chosen" and "Outlaw", and in April, he released "East Side Flow", which was followed by "Mafia Style" with Aman Hayer. In June, his concert at the Surrey Music Festival was cancelled due to security concerns stemming from violence at his previous performances.

In August, he collaborated with Bohemia on "Same Beef", which was a huge hit. In September, he released two film soundtrack songs: "Dogar" for Teri Meri Jodi and "Jatti Jeone Morh Wargi", featuring Sonam Bajwa, for Ardab Mutiyaran. In October, he released "47", featuring British rappers Mist and Stefflon Don, which entered the top 20 on the UK Singles Chart. The song also charted on the New Zealand top 40 singles chart.

In 2019, Spotify included him in its list of the most popular artists in Punjab, along with Maninder Buttar and Karan Aujla.

In January 2020, Moose Wala was featured along with Nseeb on Prem Dhillon's track "Old Skool". The song was followed by "Tibeyan Da Putt", which topped the iTunes charts and was ranked at number 8 on the Apple Music charts in India. His second studio album, Snitches Get Stitches, was released under his own label in May 2020. That same month, he released the single "Dear Mama" on his mother's birthday.

In June 2020, he collaborated with Amrit Maan on the song "Bambiha Bole". whose music video was viewed over ten million times within twenty-four hours. The song reached number one in India and entered the top 50 in Canada and New Zealand on the Apple Music charts. It topped the UK Asian chart and also entered the top 5 of the Global YouTube charts. On 31 August 2020, he officially launched his record label, 5911 Records. In September 2020, he released "Game" with Shooter Kahlon. It was his first song to appear on the Canadian Hot 100 chart by Billboard. Also, "Game" is the most commented Indian song on YouTube with over 5 million comments.

In May 2021, Moose Wala released his third studio album, Moosetape. The album charted on the New Zealand Top 40 Albums chart by Recorded Music NZ. Singles from the album charted on various international charts including the Billboard Global 200, Canadian Hot 100, and New Zealand Hot Singles charts. On 12 September 2021, he performed at the Wireless Festival in London with Mist. Moose Wala was the first Indian singer to perform at this festival.

In April 2022, Moose Wala released the EP No Name featuring AR Paisley, Mr. Capone-E and Sunny Malton, The EP performed well on various music charts. It reached number 50 on the Canadian Albums Chart, and the song "Never Fold" debuted at number 92 on the Canadian Hot 100 chart. The songs also charted internationally. In New Zealand, "Never Fold" peaked at number 19, while "0 to 100" and "Love Sick" reached numbers 34 and 39, respectively. In the UK, "Never Fold" topped the Punjabi chart at number 4, followed by "0-100" at number 9 and "Everybody Hurts" at number 10.

Before his death, Sidhu Moose Wala released two songs, "The Last Ride" and "Levels". "Levels" was his last song, released in May 2022. These songs made it to the Billboard Canadian Hot 100 chart. "The Last Ride" reached number 26 and "Levels" reached number 32. Additionally, both songs appeared on the Billboard Global Excl. US chart, with "The Last Ride" at number 103 and "Levels" at number 195.

=== Posthumous releases ===
In June 2022, his single "SYL" (a reference to the Satluj Yamuna link canal) posthumously peaked at 27 on the Canadian Hot 100, 81 in Australia, 3 in India, and 200 on the Global Excl. US chart.

In April 2023, Sidhu's unreleased song "Mera Na", a collaboration with Burna Boy, was released posthumously. The song charted on several international music charts. In Canada, it peaked at number 14 on the Canadian Hot 100 chart on 22 April 2023. Globally, the song reached number 102 on the Billboard Global Excl. US chart. In New Zealand, it peaked at number 2 on the NZ Hot Singles Chart. In the UK, the song reached number 87 on the UK Singles Chart and number 27 on the UK Indie Singles Chart.

"Chorni", a collaboration with Divine, was released in July 2023 and went on to chart on several international music charts. The song achieved notable success, peaking at number 27 on the Canada Hot 100 chart and number 7 on the NZ Hot Singles Chart. Another song, "Watch Out", a collaboration with Sikander Kahlon, was released in November 2023, which also gained significant traction, reaching number 33 on the Canada Hot 100 chart, number 11 on the New Zealand Hot Singles Chart, and number 3 on the UK Asian Chart.

Sidhu's song "Drippy", a collaboration with AR Paisley, was released in February 2024. The song charted on several international music charts. In Canada, it peaked at number 9 on the Canadian Hot 100 chart. Globally, the song reached number 152 on the Billboard Global Excluding US chart. In New Zealand, it peaked at number 11 on the NZ Hot Singles Chart and number 1 on the UK Asian Singles Chart.

Sidhu released another titled "410" in collaboration with Sunny Malton in April 2024. He also collaborated with Fredo and Steel Banglez on a song released in August 2023. Both songs charted on the Canada Hot 100, New Zealand, and UK music charts.

=== Acting ===
Moose Wala made his debut in Punjabi cinema with the film Yes I Am Student under his own production company Jatt Life Studios. The film was directed by Tarnvir Singh Jagpal and written by Gill Raunta. In 2019, Moose Wala appeared in Teri Meri Jodi. In June 2020, he announced another film titled Gunah. On 22 August 2021, he released the teaser of his upcoming movie, Moosa Jatt, starring Sweetaj Brar and directed by Tru Makers. On 24 August 2021, he announced his new film Jattan Da Munda Gaun Lagya, directed by Amberdeep Singh, which was set for release on 18 March 2022.

== Public image ==
Sidhu Moose Wala's public image was complex and controversial. As a celebrated music icon, he was admired for his unique style and authenticity. However, his lyrics often sparked controversy, with critics accusing him of promoting violence. Despite this, Sidhu Moose Wala remained steadfast and defended his views, subsequently earning a strong following and leaving a lasting impact on Punjabi music. Raja Kumari called Sidhu Moose Wala her "Gentle Giant", stating, "He played a huge role in popularizing Punjabi music and creating opportunities for female artists like me." Honey Singh credited Sidhu Moose Wala for taking Punjabi music to the global stage.

Badshah called Sidhu Moose Wala a legend, noting his legacy and decision to remain connected to his community roots despite achieving global success.

== Personal life ==
=== Family ===
Sidhu Moose Wala lived in Moosa, his home village, where his fans often came to visit him. He was very attached to his grandmother and kept his hair long at her request, a practice considered important in Sikhism. His father was unable to keep his hair due to an accident. On 17 March 2024, two years after his death, Sidhu's parents had a second son via in vitro fertilisation.

=== Feuds ===
Moose Wala was rivals with Karan Aujla with whom he exchanged taunts in songs, social media, and in live performances. Both were criticised for songs promoting violence. In an interview, their mutual colleague Elly Mangat disclosed that the dispute between the two began when Moose Wala's video targeting Aujla in his song was leaked to Aujla's management, after which Mangat threatened to attack Moose Wala. Following the incident, both started targeting each other on social media. The rivalry was resolved temporarily until Aujla released "Lafaafe", to which Moose Wala responded with "Warning Shots". Aujla in an interview stated that he did not write the track "Lafaafe" and refused to talk further about their rivalry, but praised Moose Wala's work. After his death, Aujla paid tribute to Moose in the song "Maa".

=== Legal issues and controversies ===
At the time of his death, Moose Wala was facing criminal charges for promoting gun culture and violence. Two of the charges were related to obscene scenes.

In May 2020, two videos featuring him went viral on social media: one showed him training to use an AK-47 with assistance from police officers, and the other showed him using a personal pistol. The six officers who had assisted him were suspended following the incident. On 19 May, he was booked under two sections of the Arms Act. The police began conducting raids to find Moose Wala, but he hid to evade arrest. On 2 June, the Barnala District Court rejected a plea for anticipatory bail for Moose Wala and five accused officers.

On 6 June 2020, Moose Wala was fined by police in Nabha because his car windows were tinted darker than what was permissible, and he was allowed to leave despite being wanted on outstanding charges; he incorrectly told the officers that he was already out on bail. In July, he joined the police investigation and was granted regular bail. That month, he released a single titled "Sanju", comparing himself to actor Sanjay Dutt, who was also arrested under the Arms Act. Indian sport shooter Avneet Sidhu criticised the song and called out Moose Wala for promoting gun culture. The next day, a case was registered against him for releasing the song. In an interview, Moose Wala alleged that he was being deliberately targeted by some news channels and lawyers.

=== References to Mai Bhago ===
In September 2019, his song "Jatti Jeone Morh Wargi" was deemed inappropriate by Sikh leaders for using the name of Mai Bhago, a 17th-century Sikh warrior woman. Sikh delegations and Akali Dal leaders demanded a ban on the song, subsequently lodging complaints against Moose Wala in Mansa and Bathinda. Moose Wala later apologised on social media and in March 2020 appeared before the Sikh religious body Akal Takht in a hearing over the incident.

=== References to Khalistan movement ===
In December 2020, Moose Wala released the single "Panjab: My Motherland" in support of the Indian farmers protest against the 2020 Indian agriculture acts, which featured clips of orthodox Sikh militant Jarnail Singh Bhindranwale and speeches made by Khalistan supporter Bharpur Singh Balbir in the late 1980s. In an interview Moose Wala said that Khalistan means a 'pure place' (Hindi: पवित्र-स्थान), like it was under the rule of Maharaja Ranjit Singh, where people of all religions lived in harmony. Similarly Sidhu clarified in the interview that Khalistan, to him, means the rule of Maharaja Ranjit Singh, not a separate country. He emphasised that he is an Indian citizen, living in India, and has a deep connection to the country.

== Politics ==
Moose Wala actively campaigned for his mother, Charan Kaur, who won the sarpanch election for Moosa in December 2018.

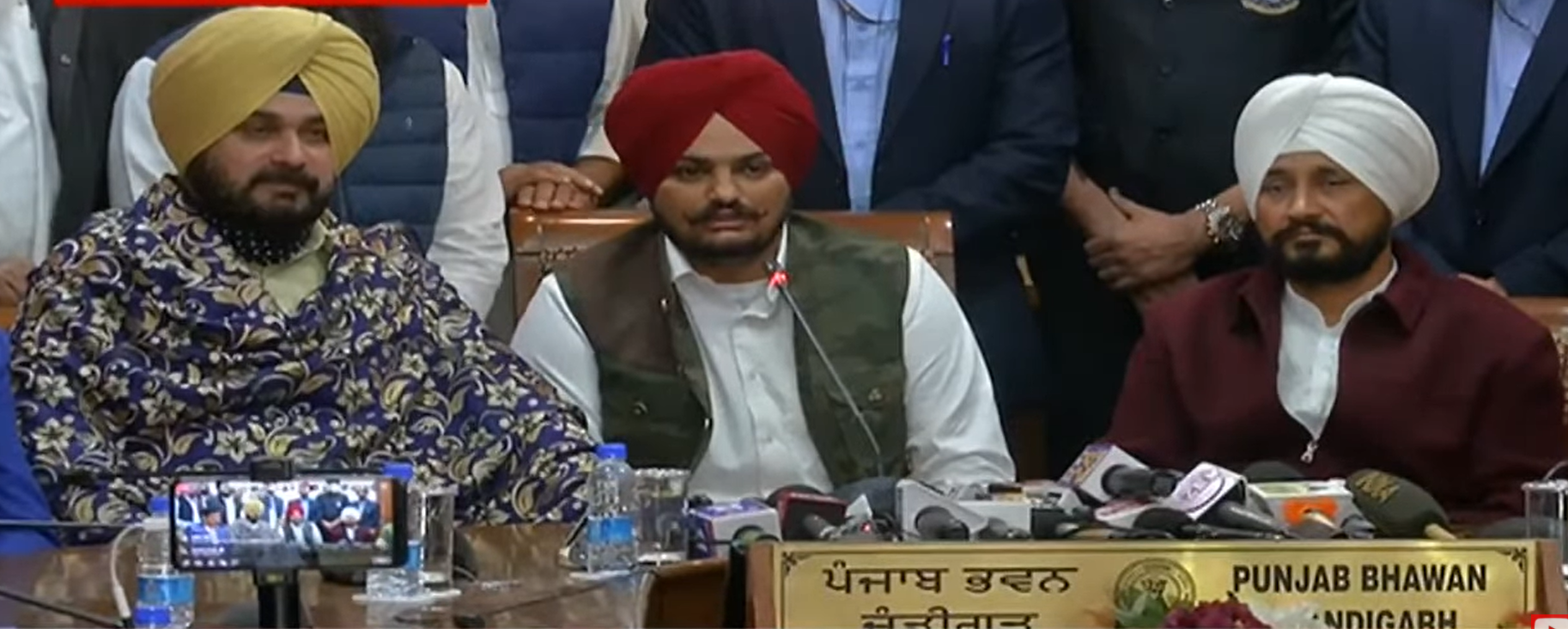
Moose Wala joining Indian National Congress in the presence of Chief Minister Charanjit Singh Channi and PPCC President Navjot Singh Sidhu.

On 3 December 2021, Moose Wala joined the INC to contest the 2022 Punjab Legislative Assembly election. Nazar Singh Manshahia, the INC assemblyman from Mansa, revolted and opposed Moose Wala's candidacy. Obtaining only 20.52% votes from the Mansa constituency, Moose Wala lost to the Aam Aadmi Party's Vijay Singla by a margin of 63,323 votes.

During the 2022 election, a case under Section 188 of the Indian Penal Code was filed against Moose Wala for his violation of the election code of conduct. He had held a door-to-door campaign in Mansa after the campaigning deadline. On 11 April 2022, Moose Wala released a song titled "Scapegoat", in which he laments his failure in the 2022 elections. The Aam Aadmi Party (AAP) claimed that Moose Wala insinuated through his song that the voters of Punjab were gadara (Punjabi: ਗੱਦਾਰ, lit. 'traitors') for electing the AAP. They also claimed that his song perpetuated the INC's "anti-Punjab" mentality and demanded an answer from the party's state unit president, Amrinder Singh Raja Warring, on whether he endorsed Moose Wala's views.

=== Electoral results ===
Punjab Assembly election, 2022: Mansa
Party	Candidate	Votes	%	±%
AAP	Vijay Singla	100,023	57.57	▲
INC	Shubhdeep Singh Sidhu Moosewala	36,700	21.12	▼
SAD	Prem Arora	27,180	15.64	
SAD(A)	Rajinder Singh	4,089	2.35	
PLC	Jiwan Dass Bawa	1,734	1.0	
NOTA	None of the above	1,099	0.63	
Majority		63,323	36.45	
Turnout		173,756	79.25	
Registered electors		219,264		
AAP hold				

== Assassination ==
Assassination of Sidhu Moose Wala
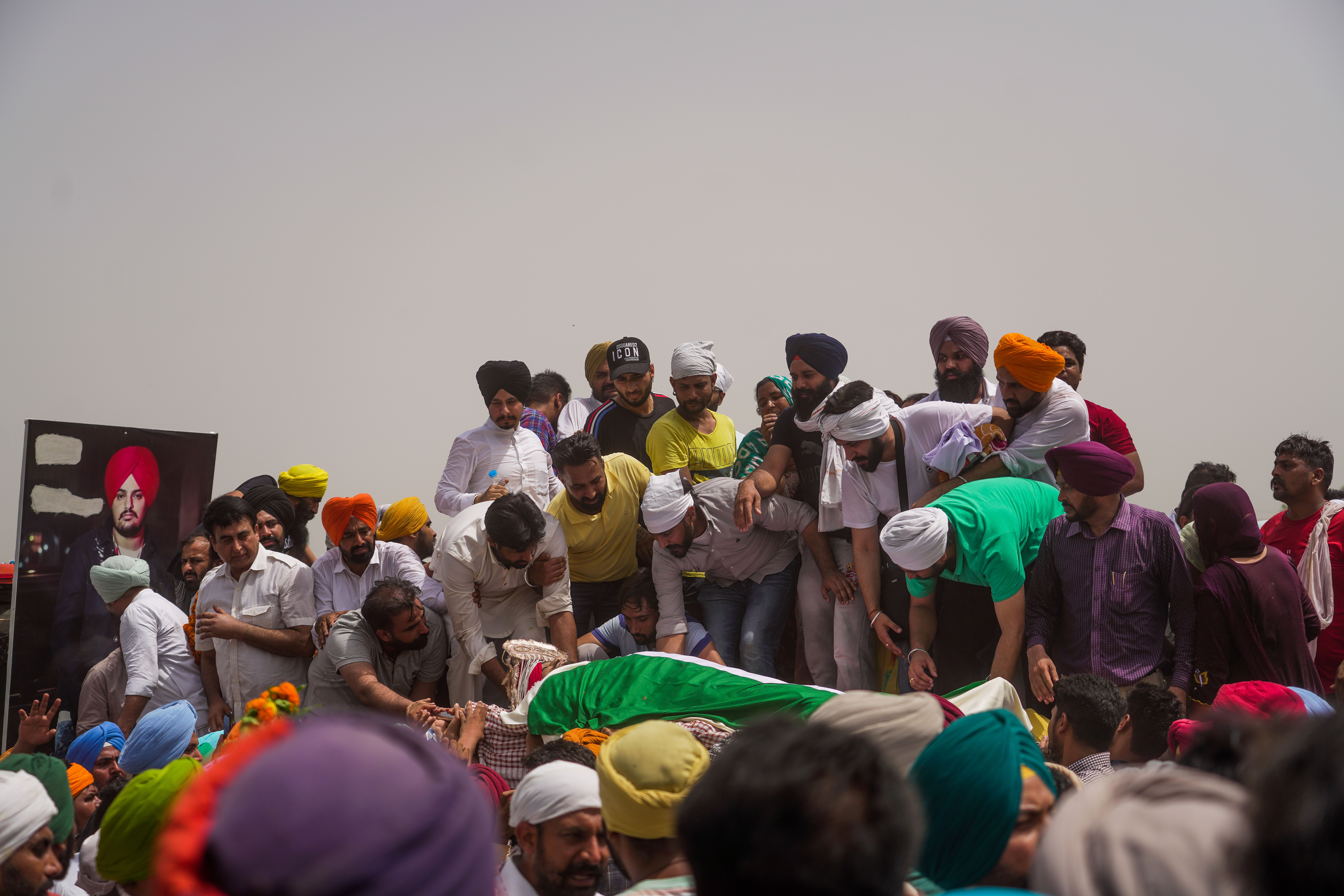
- Moose Wala's cremation on 31 May 2022
- Location: Jawaharke Village, Mansa, Punjab, India
- Date: 29 May 2022; 4 years ago 5:30 p.m. (IST)
- Target: Sidhu Moose Wala
- Attack type: Murder by drive-by shooting, assassination
- Deaths: 1 (Sidhu Moose Wala)
- Injuries: 2
- Perpetrator: Unconfirmed
- Accused: Lawrence Bishnoi; Goldy Brar

Moose Wala was shot dead by unidentified assailants in his car on 29 May 2022 in Jawaharke village of Mansa at age of 28. According to police, Lawrence Bishnoi's gang initially claimed responsibility for the murder in an unverified Facebook post, which Bishnoi denied making, and he was being held by the Punjab Police as of June 2022 and was considered the "mastermind" of the murder by officials.

According to police, at around 5:10 pm, Moose Wala left his house with his cousin Gurpreet Singh and neighbour Gurwinder Singh. Moose Wala was driving his black Mahindra Thar SUV to his aunt's house in Barnala. At 5:30 pm when the SUV reached Jawaharke, two other cars intercepted and blocked it. Thirty rounds were fired during the incident, which also injured two other men. Moose Wala fired back at the attackers using his pistol. After the shootout, the attackers left the scene. His father took Moose Wala to the civil hospital in Mansa, where he was declared dead.

Moose Wala was among the 424 people whose police security was reduced or entirely removed the day before, in preparation for the anniversary of Operation Blue Star, leaving him with two commandos instead of the earlier four. At the time of the incident, Moose Wala was travelling in his private car accompanied by two others instead of his bullet-proof vehicle with the commandos. According to his friends, Moose Wala did not take his security along with him, as his Thar SUV could not accommodate five people.

=== Aftermath ===
According to police, the Bishnoi gang claimed they killed Moose Wala to avenge the murder of an Akali leader, Vicky Middukhera, in 2021. Moose Wala's aide was purported by the Bishnoi gang of having a role in the killing of Middukhera, though there is no legal evidence to support this. Canadian gangster of Punjabi origin Satinder Singh a.k.a. Goldy Brar claimed responsibility for the murder. Brar, a close associate of Bishnoi, claimed that his "Punjab module" carried out the shooting. Both Brar and Bishnoi have criminal cases against them in India. The Punjab Police later confirmed Bishnoi's involvement.

According to the police report, Moose Wala's father revealed that Moose Wala had been receiving death threats from gangsters for extortion purposes, a statement corroborated by singer Mika Singh.

Punjab Chief Minister Bhagwant Mann condemned the murder. Calling Moose Wala "a cultural icon of Punjab", he expressed shock and grief about his death and condoled the aggrieved family. Mann ordered an investigation into why Moose Wala's security was reduced by the Punjab Police two days prior. He also announced the setting up of a judicial commission headed by a sitting judge of the Punjab and Haryana High Court to investigate the killing. Numerous celebrities offered their condolences on social media.

Police found bullets from an AN-94 Russian assault rifle and a pistol at the spot of the killing. Police had detained six suspects of the incident from the state of Uttarakhand. On 30 May, one of the murder suspects was detained by the Punjab Police while he was hiding among the pilgrims of Gurudwara Shri Hemkund Sahib.

On 30 May, the Delhi unit of the INC staged a protest near AAP leader Arvind Kejriwal's residence holding the AAP-ruled Government of Punjab responsible for the incident, blaming their decision to curtail Moose Wala's security cover.

His autopsy was carried out by five doctors, and the event was videographed. According to post mortem reports, Moose Wala received 19 bullet injuries, and he died within 15 minutes of being shot due to the wounds. Moose Wala was cremated in his ancestral village on 31 May. His last rites were performed on his farmland.

On 3 June, Bishnoi allegedly admitted to being involved in the murder and that he had a rivalry with Moose Wala. On 8 June, a bhog ceremony was arranged in Mansa. On 3 July, Ankit Sirsa was arrested by Delhi police for being one of the shooters involved in the killing. On 20 July, gangsters Manpreet Mannu and Jagrup Rupa, suspected of involvement in Moose Wala's killing, were gunned down by the Punjab Police. On 26 July, India TV reported that Punjab Police arrested the last absconding shooter, Deepak Mundi. However, The Indian Express reported that he was arrested on 11 September near the Bengal-Nepal border.

=== Politics ===
Before the Sangrur Lok Sabha by-election in 2022, the INC had used pictures of Moose Wala in its election song. The family of Moose Wala made a public appeal to political parties and individuals, asking them to not use his name for political or personal motives. The move was also criticised by the Aam Aadmi Party.

== Legacy and remembrance ==
- On 3 June 2022, Punjab Chief Minister Bhagwant Mann announced the construction of a cancer hospital and sports stadium in remembrance of Moose Wala.
- On 8 June 2022, the Brampton, Canada city council passed a motion to commission a giant mural which would be painted by a local artist and to plant a tree in the singer's honour. In June 2023, the mural was finished.
- In June 2022, a turban-tying competition was organised by the Shri Guru Ram Dass welfare society in Amritsar in his memory, due to him being a turban-wearing Sikh.
- Punjabi language singer Prem Dhillon released a tribute song, "Ain't died in vain", dedicated to Moose Wala on 16 June 2022. Posthumously, on his 29th birthday, Moose Wala received a tribute from his fans when the billboards of New York City's Times Square were used to play his songs.
- Garry Sandhu released the tribute song "Jigar Da Tota", dedicated to Moose Wala.
- On 5 June 2022, two murals in California, USA were made in tribute of Moose Wala. Rapper Bohemia also visited them and broke down in tears after an emotional tribute.
- On 17 June 2022, Canadian rapper Drake played two of Moose Wala's singles "295" & "G-Shit" from Moosetape in remembrance on his debut radio show Table for One on Sound42. Drake later launched a t-shirt collection to honour Moose Wala, wearing one at a concert in Canada on 28 July.
- On 25 July 2022, Punjabi Virsa, a Pakistan-based literary society, honoured Moose Wala with the Waris Shah International Award.
- In November 2022, Nigerian artist Burna Boy met with Moose Wala's parents for their blessings and offered his condolences. Burna and music producer Steel Banglez honoured them with a portrait of their son made from crystals. Burna also paid tribute to Moose Wala previously, when he broke down on stage while giving a tribute to the late singer.
- Sunny Malton, who was formerly in the Punjabi group Brown Boys with Moose Wala, released a tribute song "Letter to Sidhu" in November 2022.
- In April 2023, the third posthumous release from Moose Wala, titled "Mera Na", was unveiled in advance of the one-year anniversary of his passing. The song, which features Burna Boy and Steel Banglez, was composed by the latter and quickly gained millions of plays.
- In May 2023, award-winning British rapper Tion Wayne released the song "Healing" which paid tribute to the late Moose Wala. It features Moose Wala's father (Balkaur Singh Sidhu), his 5911 Tractor and his village of Moosa. Wayne had previously collaborated with Moose Wala on the song "Celebrity Killer" in 2022.
- A posthumous tour, titled "Signed to God", employing the use of hologram to recreate Moosewala's presence, was announced in 2025. It took place in 2026, starting from an initial concert held in Toronto, where the music video for the track "295" was premiered during the show.

== Discography ==
=== Studio albums ===
- PBX 1 (2018)
- Snitches Get Stitches (2020)
- Moosetape (2021)

=== EPs ===
- No Name (2022)
- Moose Print (2025)

== Filmography ==
Year	Film	Role	Notes
2019	Teri Meri Jodi	Jeona	Guest appearance
2021	Moosa Jatt	Moosa	Debut film
2021	Yes I Am Student	Jass Gill	
2022	Jattan Da Munda Gaun Lagya		Directed and written by Amberdeep Singh
† not yet released

== Tours ==
- Brown Boys Tour/PBX 1 Tour (2018–2019)
- Solo New Zealand/Italy/India Live Shows (2019–2020)
- Back to Business World Tour with Sunny Malton (2022–2023)
- Rebel (24 August 2018)

== See also ==
- List of murdered hip hop musicians
