= Moosetape =

Studio album by Sidhu Moose Wala
- Released: 15 May 2021
- Recorded: 2020–2021
- Genres: Hip hop; R&B; drill; progressive hip hop; gangsta rap; hardcore hip hop
- Length: 97:00
- Label: Sidhu Moose Wala
- Producers: The Kidd; Steel Banglez; Snappy; Wazir Patar; JB; M1onthebeat; Chris Rich; A.Singh

Sidhu Moose Wala chronology
Snitches Get Stitches (2020)	Moosetape (2021)	No Name (2022)

Singles from Moosetape
- 1. "Burberry" Released: 20 May 2021; 2. "US" Released: 23 May 2021; 3. "Brown Shortie" Released: 29 May 2021; 4. "Me and My Girlfriend" Released: 7 June 2021; 5. "Signed To God" Released: 16 June 2021; 6. "Malwa Block" Released: 23 June 2021; 7. "G-Shit" Released: 4 July 2021; 8. "Calaboose" Released: 10 July 2021; 9. "IDGAF" Released: 17 July 2021; 10. "Power" Released: 21 July 2021; 11. "GOAT" Released: 25 July 2021; 12. "Celebrity Killer" Released: 9 August 2021

Moosetape is the second and final studio album by Indian singer, rapper and songwriter Sidhu Moose Wala, released independently on 15 May 2021. Moose Wala served as the executive producer. Writing was handled by Sidhu dominantly among other artists, while the tracks were produced by The Kidd, Steel Banglez, Snappy, Wazir Patar, and JB. At 32 tracks, it is Moose Wala's longest album. It features guest vocals from Bohemia, Tion Wayne, Stefflon Don, Morrisson, Divine, Raja Kumari, Blockboi Twitch and Sikander Kahlon. The music video for the track "GOAT" surpassed 430 million views on YouTube as of May 2026.

== Background ==
The album was announced by Sidhu Moose Wala on 10 March 2021, on his official Instagram account, followed by the unveiling of the official cover art, features and credits of every track per day until 23 April 2021.

Moose Wala released the teaser of the album on his YouTube channel on 29 April 2021, announcing the release date. The teaser was viewed over a million times within twelve hours of its release. On 5 May 2021, Moose Wala released the trailer of the album. Tracklist was revealed on 12 May 2021 on his instagram handle.

The tracks were released one by one from 15 May 2021; they were scheduled to release until 21 July. On 18 May 2021, he released the bonus track "Unfuckwithable" featuring Afsana Khan, which was produced by The Kidd and the music video was directed by Teji Sandhu.

Posthumously, the track "295" charted at 154 on the Billboard Global 200, making Moose Wala the first Punjabi singer to do so. The song was heavily played after his death as the song title coincidentally highlights the date of his death.

As of 6 December 2023, Moosetape became the first Indian album to reach 1 billion streams on Spotify.

== Track listing ==
All tracks are written by Sidhu Moose Wala, except where noted.

Moosetape track listing
No.	Title	Writer(s)	Producer(s)	Length
1.	"Moosetape Intro"		Wazir Patar	1:32
2.	"Bitch I'm Back"		The Kidd	3:50
3.	"Burberry"		The Kidd	3:23
4.	"Racks and Rounds" (featuring Sikander Kahlon)	Moose Wala; Sikander Kahlon	The Kidd	3:45
5.	"US" (featuring Raja Kumari)	Moose Wala; Raja Kumari	The Kidd	3:50
6.	"Moosedrilla" (featuring Divine)	Moose Wala; Divine	The Kidd	3:52
7.	"Boo Call" (skit)		Wazir Patar	0:43
8.	"Brown Shortie" (featuring Sonam Bajwa)		The Kidd	3:28
9.	"Aroma"		The Kidd	4:16
10.	"Real One" (skit)		Wazir Patar	0:44
11.	"GOAT"		Wazir Patar	3:34
12.	"Sidhu Son"		The Kidd	3:37
13.	"Chacha Huu" (skit)		Wazir Patar	0:46
14.	"Me and My Girlfriend"		The Kidd	3:23
15.	"These Days" (featuring Bohemia)	Moose Wala; Bohemia	The Kidd	3:29
16.	"Ultimatum" (skit)		The Kidd	1:30
17.	"Signed to God"		Steel Banglez; The Kidd; JB	2:27
18.	"Regret"		The Kidd	5:11
19.	"Pind Hood Damn Good" (RMG Intro)	Randiala Wala	Wazir Patar	1:15
20.	"Malwa Block"		Wazir Patar	3:59
21.	"B&W"		The Kidd	4:05
22.	"Celebrity Killer" (featuring Tion Wayne)	Moose Wala; Tion Wayne	Steel Banglez; M1; Chris Rich; A Singh; JB; The Kidd	3:23
23.	"Invincible" (featuring Stefflon Don)	Moose Wala; Stefflon Don	Steel Banglez; The Kidd	4:04
24.	"Amli Talk" (skit)		Wazir Patar	0:44
25.	"G-Shit" (featuring Blockboi Twitch)	Moose Wala; Blockboi Twitch	The Kidd	3:53
26.	"Built Different"		The Kidd	4:07
27.	"Trial Day" (skit)		Wazir Patar	1:59
28.	"Calaboose"		Snappy	4:05
29.	"Facts" (skit)		Wazir Patar	1:11
30.	"295"		The Kidd	4:30
31.	"IDGAF" (featuring Morrisson)	Moose Wala; Morrisson	The Kidd	2:56
32.	"Power"		The Kidd	3:48
Total length:				97:00

Bonus Track
No.	Title	Writer(s)	Producer	Length
1.	"Unfuckwithable" (with Afsana Khan)	Sidhu	The Kidd	4:43
Total length:				4:43

Notes

- There is no deluxe edition of the Album, the bonus Track "Unfuckwithable" was released as single between track 3 and 4.
- All tracks were released as one track per day as per schedule from 15 May – 9 August 2021.
- "Moosetape Intro" features vocals from Gurinder Dimpy.
- "Boo Call (skit)" features uncredited vocal by Sonam Bajwa.
- "Brown Shortie" has credited Sonam Bajwa as a vocal feature, although she is featured in the music video only.
- "Pind Hood Damn Good (RMG Intro)" features uncredited vocals by Randiala Wala.
- "Malwa Block" and "Goat" have Wazir Patar in the lead, although he is credited as a producer.

== Personnel ==
- Sidhu Moose Wala – vocals, writer, executive producer
- Jumana Abdu Rahman – actor
- Bohemia – featured artist
- Divine – featured artist
- Stefflon Don – featured artist
- Sikander Kahlon – featured artist
- Raja Kumari – featured artist
- Morrisson – featured artist
- Blockboi Twitch – featured artist
- Tion Wayne – featured artist
- Afsana Khan - featured artist
- Preet Aujla – actor
- Sonam Bajwa – actor
- Sara Gurpal – actor

=== Technical personnel ===
- Steel Banglez – producer
- Dense – engineer
- The Kidd – producer
- Wazir Patar – producer
- Snappy – producer
- Dense – mixing & mastering all tracks from Moosetape except "Calaboose"
- Bauss-P – mixing & mastering for the track "Calaboose"
- FlutePreet Singh - flute programing for tracks 18 & 26

== Music videos and directors ==
- Sukh Sanghera
  - US
  - Brown Shortie
  - G-Shit
  - IDGAF
  - Power
  - GOAT.
- Tru-Makers
  - Calaboose
- Teji Sandhu
  - Burberry
  - Unfuckwithable
- Raf-Saperra
  - Signed To God
  - Celebrity Killer
- Jashan Narrah
  - Me and My Girlfriend
- Hunny Pk Films
  - Malwa Block
- Navkaran Brar (audio visual artist)

== Promotion ==
=== Tour ===
On 4 July 2021, Moose Wala announced the Moosetape Tour officially on his Instagram Live with the name "Moosetape World Tour", and regions including North America, UK, Canada, Dubai, Australia and Pakistan. The tour was scheduled to be in 2021, but due to concerns from the ongoing COVID-19 pandemic, it was postponed. The tour's first leg was announced by BollyBoom Entertainment India, that held concerts in 4 different cities of India, which was produced by themselves only.

On 26 December 2021; the tour's promoter Platinum Events Inc. introduced the upcoming world tour of Sidhu Moose Wala.

After five shows, on 17 April 2022, Moose Wala officially changed the tour's name to Back To Business World Tour with Sunny Malton as a supporting act. However, the tour was cancelled shortly after Moose Wala's death on 29 May 2022.

==== Set list ====
This set list is representative of the show on 26 March 2022, in Dubai, UAE. It is not representative of all concerts for the duration of the tour

1. "295"
2. "These Days"
3. "Satisfy"
4. "Old-Skool"
5. "GOAT"
6. "Same-Beef"
7. "US"
8. "So-High"
9. "Celebrity-Killer"
10. "G-Shit"

Encore

12. "Moosedrilla"

Notes

- During the show in Mumbai on 21 November 2021, Raja Kumari joined Moose Wala onstage to perform their duet song "US".

==== Tour dates ====
This list includes planned dates that were subsequently cancelled.

List of concerts, showing date, city, country, venue, opening acts, tickets sold, number of available tickets and amount of gross revenue.
Date	City	Country	Venue	Opening acts	Notes
Leg 1 - Asia
20 November 2021	Gurgaon	India	Imperfecto Patio	–	
21 November 2021	Mumbai	India	Opa Bar & Cafe	Raja Kumari	
4 December 2021	Noida	India	Local Noida	–	
17 December 2021	Hyderabad	India	Prism, Hyderabad	–	
26 March 2022	Dubai	United Arab Emirates	Coca-Cola Arena	Afsana Khan	
4 June 2022	Gurugram	India	BackYard Sports Club		The concert was cancelled due to Moosewala's death
Leg 2 - North America
23 July 2022	Vancouver	Canada	PNE Coliseum	Sunny Malton	The concert was cancelled due to Moosewala's death
24 July 2022	Winnipeg	Canada	Shaw Park	Sunny Malton	The concert was cancelled due to Moosewala's death
30 July 2022	Toronto	Canada	Paramount Fine Foods Centre	Sunny Malton	The concert was cancelled due to Moosewala's death
31 July 2022	Calgary	Canada	—	Sunny Malton	The concert was cancelled due to Moosewala's death
5 August 2022	New York	United States	—	Sunny Malton	The concert was cancelled due to Moosewala's death
6 August 2022	Chicago	United States	—	Sunny Malton	The concert was cancelled due to Moosewala's death
12 August 2022	Fresno	United States	—	Sunny Malton	The concert was cancelled due to Moosewala's death
13 August 2022	Bay Area	United States	Oakland Arena	Sunny Malton	The concert was cancelled due to Moosewala's death
Leg 3 - Europe
9 September 2022	Birmingham	United Kingdom	TBA	Sunny Malton	
11 September 2022	London	United Kingdom	TBA	Sunny Malton	

=== Virtual experiences ===
On 10 June 2021, Moose Wala collaborated with music streaming app Spotify, hosted by Vishnu Kausal. Actress Sonam Bajwa also joined the live session.

== Charts ==
=== Album ===
Chart performance for Moosetape
Chart (2021–2022)	Peak position
Canadian Albums (Billboard)	33
New Zealand Albums (RMNZ)	33

=== Singles ===
Title	Chart (2021)	Peak position
"Bitch I'm Back"	Top Triller Global (Billboard)	1
"Moosedrilla"	Top Triller Global (Billboard)	1
"US"	Top Triller Global (Billboard)	3
"Brown Shortie"	Top Triller Global (Billboard)	7
"These Days"	Top Triller Global (Billboard)	13
"Bitch I'm Back"	Canadian Hot 100 (Billboard)	81
"Brown Shortie"	Canadian Hot 100 (Billboard)	80
"295"	Canadian Hot 100 (Billboard)	62
"GOAT"	Canadian Hot 100 (Billboard)	100
"Bitch I'm Back"	New Zealand Hot	14
"Burberry"	New Zealand Hot	15
"Racks and Rounds"	New Zealand Hot	16
"US"	New Zealand Hot	23
"Moosedrilla"	New Zealand Hot	25
"INVINCIBLE"	New Zealand Hot	35
"G-Shit"	New Zealand Hot	20
"Brown Shortie"	New Zealand Hot	15
"These Days"	New Zealand Hot	33
"Built Different"	New Zealand Hot	33
"Calaboose"	New Zealand Hot	24
"295"	New Zealand Hot	27
"295"	Billboard Global 200	154

== Certifications ==
Certifications for "Moosetape"
Region	Certification	Certified units/sales
New Zealand (RMNZ)	Gold	7,500^{‡}
^{‡} Sales+streaming figures based on certification alone.
