= Steel Banglez =

British producer and solo artist

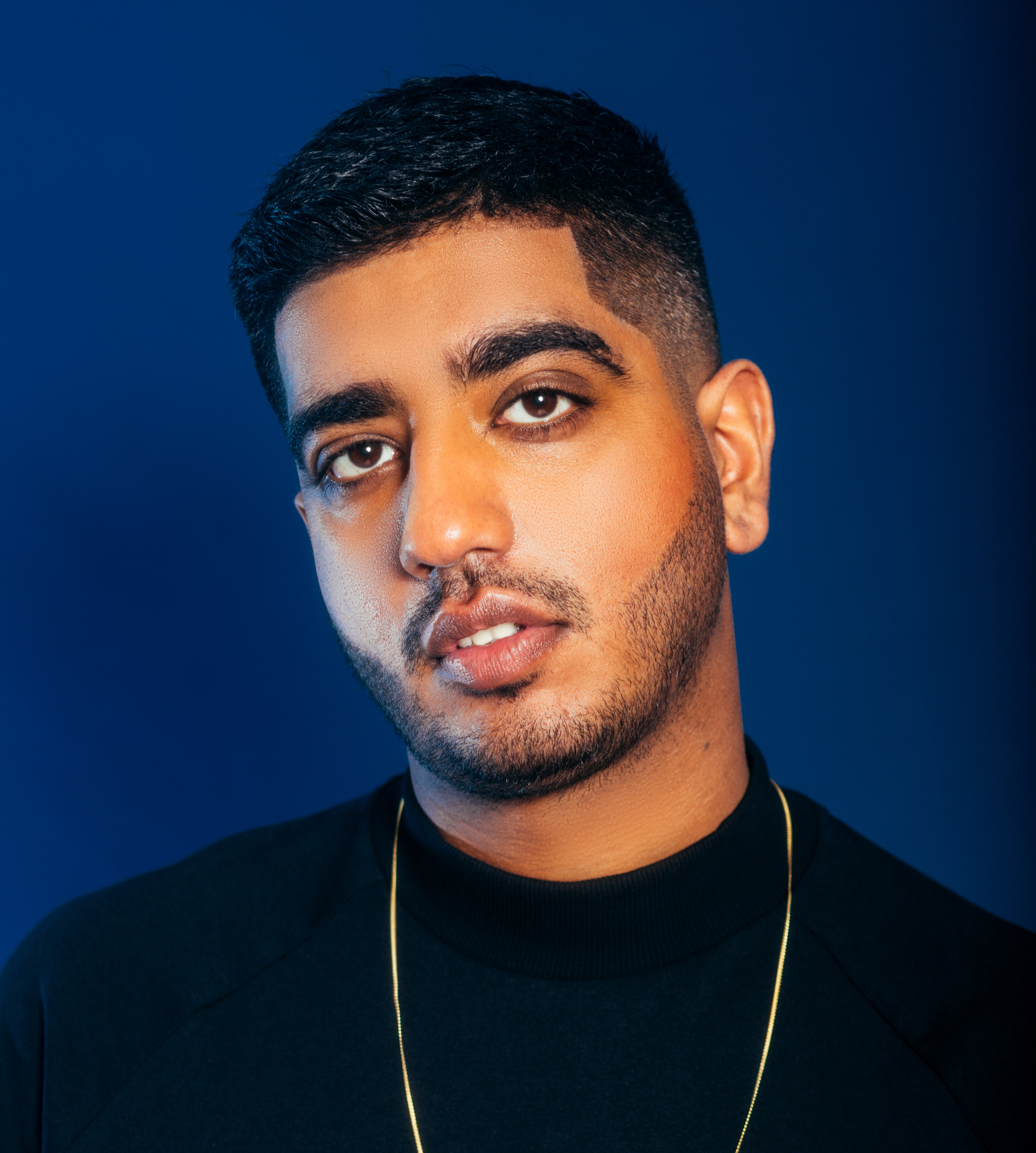
- Steel Banglez in 2019

Background information
- Also known as: Steel Banglez
- Born: Pahuldip Singh Sandhu; 5 February 1987 (age 39); Forest Gate, London, England
- Genres: British hip hop; afroswing; grime
- Occupation: Record producer
- Years active: 2002–present
- Labels: Gifted Music; Warner Bros.
- Website: steelbanglezmusic.com

Pahuldip Singh Sandhu (born 5 February 1987), known by his stage name Steel Banglez, is a British record producer and musician of Punjabi descent. He is currently signed to Warner Bros. Records. Best known for his production work with artists including Mist, MoStack, J Hus and Wiley, Steel Banglez achieved his first chart hit as a lead artist when his track "Bad" reached the top 30 on the UK Singles Chart in February 2018. His highest-charting single on the UK Singles Chart is "Fashion Week" featuring British rappers AJ Tracey and MoStack which peaked at number 7.

== Early life ==
Born in Forest Gate, Sandhu grew up in Newham, east London. Raised in a Sikh family, he was surrounded by traditional Indian instruments such as harmoniums and tablas as his mother was a music teacher. In addition to being of Indian Punjabi descent, Sandhu has also stated to have Pakistani, Bangladeshi and Sri Lankan ancestry.

At the age of 10, he started DJing jungle music alongside his brothers and subsequently presented a show on the pirate radio station Mystic FM. He started producing music in his early teens after a teacher introduced him to the audio workstation Fruity Loops, and soon produced his first track "Dreams" for his neighbour, the influential grime artist D Double E. He soon gained further exposure when he produced the Big H freestyle from the Practise Hours 2 DVD.

Steel Banglez's career was halted when he was imprisoned at the age of 17, serving three years of a six-year sentence for the possession of a firearm with the intent to endanger lives.

== Music career ==
=== 2005–2014: Early music career ===
While in prison, Steel Banglez befriended the rappers Fix Dot’M, Yung Meth and Colours Miyagi, and would produce beats for them on a keyboard. This resulted in his musical direction becoming focused upon rap, and he also gained attention in south London where the centre of the capital's rap scene was based. His earliest production credits came in the mid-2000s. He produced “Colours” by D Double E and Big H’s Practice Hours 2 Freestyle.

After being released, Steel Banglez contributed production to Fix Dot'M and Yung Meth's mixtape A Fix of Meth, and he teamed up again with Yung Meth, this time with Ghetts, on "Tidal Wave" which was released on SB.TV. He soon started working on tracks with a wider range of artists, such as "Breakdown" (with Big H, P Money, Wiley and Ghetts) and "Go Down South" (with Krept, Konan, Chip and Yungen, Not3s and James Lukezo of zua visa).

Eager to establish his credentials as a producer, Steel Banglez ran a home studio from his manager's house which offered free studio time to artists, with Wiley and Roll Deep two of the highest profile names to put their vocals to his beats. Steel Banglez later moved to a professional studio in what is now the Link Up TV office where he worked with Cashtastic, Yungen and Krept and Konan. In 2014, Steel Banglez focused on producing Cashtastic's debut album which was due to be released by Universal Music. However, that project ended when Cashtastic was deported to Jamaica as part of the Hostile Environment policy. As a result, new production work dried up and Steel Banglez lost direction in what he calls a “mad depressed stage” in his life.

=== 2015–present: Solo career and wider production work ===
Steel Banglez was newly inspired when he heard the track "No Buddy" by MoStack in the summer of 2015. They connected via Twitter, and Steel Banglez produced his debut mixtape Gangster with Banter. On New Year's Eve of 2015, he first heard MIST and realised that the Birmingham-based rapper's use of phrases from the Punjabi language would help him connect with a large audience.

After making contact via Instagram, Steel Banglez drove MIST to his studio in London where he played him the beat of what would become the track "Karlas Back". He produced MIST's breakthrough EP M I S T to the T in 2016 and then acted as executive producer on his Warner Bros. Records debut Diamond in the Dirt in 2018, which featured artists including MoStack, Jessie Ware and Haile from WSTRN. Another high-profile production came when he collaborated with Jae5 on "Fisherman", a track from J Hus' debut album Common Sense.

Steel Banglez's career as a lead artist was also gaining momentum. He signed a publishing deal with Warner/Chappell Music in April 2017 before signing to Warner Bros. Records, together with his imprint Spiritual Records, later renamed Gifted Music, in April 2017.

He released "Money" in March 2017, which featured several of his friends and collaborators such as MoStack, MIST, Haile and Abra Cadabra. MoStack also appeared on the follow-up single "Bad" alongside Yungen, Mr Eazi and Not3s. Released in November, "Bad" climbed the UK Singles Chart for several weeks before peaking at number 29 in February. In March, the track was certified Silver by the BPI in recognition of 200,000 sales.

Steel Banglez won Producer of the Year at GRM Daily's Rated Awards 2017.

In 2018, he won Best Non-Traditional Asian Act at Brit Asia TV Music Awards (BAMA), an award which he won again at BAMA 2019.

On 19 May 2023, he released The Playlist, his debut studio album. The album features guest appearances from Giggs, Asco, Blade Brown, Chip, Squeeks, MoStack, Aitch, Morrisson, Not3s, Blanco, Tion Wayne, Ms Banks, Backroad Gee, Kweng Face, Nines, Mist, Mastermind, Deno, King Promise, Wstrn, Yungen, M24, NSG, Rimzee, S1mba, Midas the Jagaban, Ivorian Doll, Tamera, Mowgs, Sidhu Moose Wala, Burna Boy, Clean Bandit, Wes Nelson, Stefflon Don, Unknown T, D Double E, Jaykae, Berwyn, Maverick Sabre, Ghetts, Tamer Hassan, Lotto Ash & Tiggs Da Author. The album peaked at 29 on the UK Albums Chart.

On March 27, 2025, after releasing all songs as singles from the project throughout the same month, he released his EP, One Day It Will All Make Sense, featuring a plethora of collaborators, including AP Dhillon, Nas, Afsana Khan, Ikka, Sid Sriram, Talwiinder, Stefflon Don and Idris Elba, among others. GQ India described the EP as "a fusion of rap, R&B, Afrobeat, and classical music, all stitched together with cinematic precision".

== Personal life ==
Steel Banglez's success has allowed him to help his family by funding his mother's retirement and his sister's university fees. He was given the nickname Steel Banglez by a Jamaican friend in reference to the karas (steel bracelets) that he wears as a Sikh.

Steel Banglez is an avid supporter of West Ham United F.C.

== Discography ==
=== Studio albums ===
List of studio albums, with selected details
Title	Album details	Peak chart positions
Title	Album details	UK
The Playlist	Released: 19 May 2023; Label: Gifted Music; Format: Digital download, streaming	29

=== EPs ===
Title	Album details	Peak chart positions
Title	Album details	UK
One Day It Will All Make Sense	Released: 27 March 2023; Label: Gifted Music, Mass Appeal Records; Format: Digital download, streaming	—

=== Singles ===
List of singles as lead artist, with selected chart positions, showing year released and album name
Title	Year	Peak chart positions		Certifications	Album
Title	Year	UK	IRE	Certifications	Album
"Money" (featuring Mostack, MIST, Haile and Abra Cadabra)	2017	—	—		Non-album singles
"Bad" (featuring Yungen, MoStack, Mr Eazi and Not3s)	2017	29	—	BPI: Platinum	Non-album singles
"Your Lovin'" (featuring MØ and Yxng Bane)	2018	47	—	BPI: Gold	Non-album singles
"Hot Steppa" (featuring Loski)	2018	—	—		Non-album singles
"Fashion Week" (featuring AJ Tracey & MoStack)	2019	7	69	BPI: Platinum	Non-album singles
"47" (with Sidhu Moose Wala & MIST featuring Stefflon Don)	2019	17	—		Non-album singles
"Blama" (featuring Tion Wayne & Morrisson)	2021	94	—		The Playlist
"Banglez Ting" (featuring Giggs)	2021	—	—		The Playlist
"Tell Me" (featuring Clean Bandit, Wes Nelson, Stefflon Don & Unknown T)	2021	—	—		The Playlist
"Mera Na" (with Sidhu Moose Wala & Burna Boy)	2023	87	—		The Playlist
"—" denotes a recording that did not chart or was not released in that territory.

=== Guest appearances ===
List of guest appearances, showing song title, year released, other artists and album name
Title	Year	Artist(s)	Album
"Wife Me"	2018	Raye	Side Tape
"Brown Munde"	2020	AP Dhillon, Gurinder Gill, Shinda Kahlon, Gminxr	—

=== Production credits ===
List of production credits, showing song title, year released, artists, co-producers and album name
Title	Year	Artist(s)	Produced with:	Album
"Colours"	2006	D Double E	None	On the Double
"Spaceman"	2010	Mumzy Stranger, Wiley	None	Journey Begins
"Go Down South"	2012	Krept & Konan, Yungen, Chip	None	Non-album single
"My Name"	2013	Krept & Konan, Yana Toma	None	Young Kingz
"Ciao Bella"	2016	MoStack	None	The Intent (Original Motion Picture Soundtrack)
"Karlas Back"	2016	MIST		M I S to the T
"Ain't the Same"	2016	MIST		M I S to the T
"Madness"	2016	MIST		Non-album singles
"Hot Property"	2017	MIST		Non-album singles
"Off the Record 2"	2017	Yungen	None	Non-album singles
"Where I'm From"	2017	Burna Boy	None	Outside
"Fisherman"	2017	J Hus, Mostack, MIST	Jae5	Common Sense
"It's Calm"	2017	Birdman, Sy Ari Da Kid		Rich Gang II: Lifestyles
"Screw & Brew"	2017	Mostack, MIST	Sevaqk, Zeph Ellis	High Street Kid
"No Words"	2017	Dave, MoStack	Dave, 169, Fraser T. Smith	Game Over
"Sun Comes Up" (Steel Banglez Remix)	2017	Rudimental, James Arthur, MIST	None	Non-album remix
"99 + 1"	2017	Not3s, Mostack	None	Take Not3s
"Dreams to Reality"	2018	MIST	None	Diamond in the Dirt
"On It"	2018	MIST, Nines	None	Diamond in the Dirt
"Uber"	2018	MIST, MoStack	Swifta Beater, Zeph Ellis	Diamond in the Dirt
"Game Changer"	2018	MIST	None	Diamond in the Dirt
"Display Skills"	2018	MIST, Mr Eazi, Fekky	None	Diamond in the Dirt
"Order It In"	2018	MIST, Not3s	None	Diamond in the Dirt
"Crepes and Cones (Ya Dun Know)"	2018	Krept & Konan, Mostack	None	Non-album single
"Wifey Riddim 3"	2019	AJ Tracey	None	AJ Tracey
"Yes Yes"	2019	MoStack	The Elements, Zeph Ellis	Stacko
"I'm the One"	2019	MoStack, Fredo	Hazard	Stacko
"House Party"	2020	MIST, Fredo	None	TBA
"Signed to God"	2021	Sidhu Moose Wala	The Kidd & JB	Moosetape
"Invincible"	2021	Sidhu Moose Wala, Stefflon Don	The Kidd	Moosetape
"Celebrity Killer"	2021	Sidhu Moose Wala, Tion Wayne	The Kidd, M1, Chris Rich, JB & A.Singh	Moosetape
