= The Last Ride (song) =

Single by Sidhu Moose Wala
- Language: Punjabi
- Released: 15 May 2022
- Genre: Hip hop; gangsta rap; hardcore hip hop
- Length: 4:22
- Label: Sidhu Moose Wala
- Songwriter: Sidhu Moose Wala
- Producer: Wazir Patar

Sidhu Moose Wala singles chronology
| "ScapeGoat" (2022) | "The Last Ride" (2022) | "Levels" (2022) |

Music video
- "The Last Ride" on YouTube

"The Last Ride" is a song by Punjabi singer Sidhu Moose Wala. It was self-released as a single on 15 May 2022. The song was musically produced by Wazir Patar, and written by Moose Wala. It was his penultimate song before "LEVELS", released in his lifetime before his death on 29 May 2022.

== Lyrical content ==
Moose Wala admired Tupac Shakur and Nipsey Hussle from the beginning of his career, and in many of his songs, he paid homage to both the artists. On "The Last Ride", Sidhu describes how the artists lost their lives at young ages: "ਚੋੱਬਰ ਦੇ ਚਿਹਰੇ ਉੱਤੇ ਨੂਰ ਦੱਸਦਾ, ਨੀ ਇਹਦਾ ਉੱਠੂਗਾ ਜਵਾਨੀ 'ਚ ਜਨਾਜ਼ਾਂ ਮਿੱਠੀਏ" (Gurumukhi)/ "چوبر دے چہرے اتے نور دسدا، نی ایہدا اٹھوگا جوانی 'چ جنازاں مٹھیئے" (Shahmukhi) ("Everything is revealed in the eyes of the young boy that the funeral will take place in its youth"). He also discusses how their legacies lives in the hearts of their fans, adding more about his own personal life and the negative reception he received after some of his previous songs.

Following Moose Wala's own death on 29 May 2022, the song received attention for the belief amongst his fans that he had predicted his own death.

== Commercial performance ==
After Sidhu Moose Wala was murdered at the age of 28, "The Last Ride" debuted at number 113 on the US Billboard Global Excl.US based on 12 million streams in the week ending June 7, 2022. It became Sidhu's first solo song to be debuted on Global Billboard Charts.

In India, "The Last Ride" debuted at number 1 on the Billboard India Songs chart dated June 7, 2022.

== Cover art ==
The cover of the single depicts the murder scene of Tupac Shakur.

== Music video ==
The music video of the song was also released on 15 May 2022. It was directed by Gurjant Panesar. As of April 2025, the music video has been viewed over 330 million times on YouTube.

== Charts ==
Weekly chart performance for "The Last Ride"
| Chart (2022) | Peak position |
|---|---|
| Canada (Canadian Hot 100) | 25 |
| Global Excl. US (Billboard) | 103 |
| India (Billboard) | 1 |
| New Zealand Hot Singles (Recorded Music NZ) | 18 |
| UK Asian (Official Charts Company) | 1 |
