= 47 (song) =

Single by Sidhu Moose Wala featuring Mist, Steel Banglez and Stefflon Don
- Language: Punjabi; English
- Released: October 10, 2019
- Genre: Hip hop; gangsta rap
- Length: 3:14
- Label: Catalyst; Sickmade; Gifted
- Songwriters: Sidhu Moose Wala; Stephanie Victoria Allen
- Producer: Steel Banglez

Sidhu Moose Wala featuring Mist, Steel Banglez and Stefflon Don singles chronology
| "B-Town" (2019) | "47" (2019) | "295" (2021) |

"47" is a single by Indian rapper Sidhu Moose Wala featuring British rappers Mist and Stefflon Don. It was released as a single on October 10, 2019, by Catalyst Records, Sickmade Records, and Gifted Records. The song is produced by Steel Banglez, and written by Moose Wala and Stephanie Victoria Allen.

== Music video ==
The music video of the song was released on the same day on Mist's YouTube channel. As of March 2025, the music video has been viewed over 99 million times.

== Chart performance ==
"47" reached a peak of No. 17 on the UK Singles Chart, becoming Sidhu Moose Wala's first song to enter the official singles chart there. It also topped the UK Asian chart. In New Zealand, the song peaked at No. 23 on the Hot 40 Singles chart by Recorded Music NZ. On the YouTube music charts, the song debuted at number three in the United Kingdom, and also charted in Australia, Canada, India, and New Zealand. The song reached the top 40 of the Spotify weekly charts in the UK, with over a million streams.

== Charts ==
Weekly chart performance for "47"
| Chart (2019) | Peak position |
|---|---|
| New Zealand Hot Singles (Recorded Music NZ) | 23 |
| UK Asian (Official Charts Company) | 1 |
| UK Singles (Official Charts) | 17 |
