= PBX 1 =

Studio album by Sidhu Moose Wala
- Released: 18 October 2018
- Genre: Hip hop; gangsta rap; hardcore hip hop
- Length: 33:48
- Label: T-Series
- Producer: Byg Byrd; Intense; Snappy; Harj Nagra

Sidhu Moose Wala chronology
PBX 1 (2018)	Snitches Get Stitches (2020)
External audio
- Audio Jukebox on YouTube

Singles from PBX 1
- 1. "Jatt Da Muqabla" Released: 18 October 2018; 2. "Badfella" Released: 9 November 2018; 3. "I'm Better Now" Released: 20 January 2019

PBX 1 is the debut studio album by Indian rapper Sidhu Moose Wala, released on 18 October 2018, by T-Series. The album was produced by Byg Byrd, Intense, Snappy, and Harj Nagra. Along with the album, Moose Wala also released a music video for "Jatt Da Muqabla", directed by TDot Films.

== Track listing ==
No.	Title	Music	Length
1.	"Intro"		0:30
2.	"Jatt Da Muqabala"	Snappy	3:24
3.	"Death Route"	Intense	3:37
4.	"Dawood"	Byg Byrd	3:17
5.	"Badfella"	Harj Nagra	3:37
6.	"Kala Chashma" (Skit)		0:25
7.	"Selfmade"	Byg Byrd	3:00
8.	"I'm Better Now" (Skit)		1:30
9.	"I'm Better Now"	Snappy	4:25
10.	"Devil" (Skit)		1:18
11.	"Devil"	Byg Byrd	4:05
12.	"Trend"	Snappy	3:41
13.	"Outro"		0:31
Total length:			36:52

Notes

- "Selfmade" features vocals by Sunny Malton.
- 'Intro', 'Kala Chashma (skit)' and 'Outro' features uncredited vocals by Harjinder Thind.

== Chart performance ==
The album debuted at number 66 on the Billboard Canadian Albums Chart. The album reached the top spot on iTunes and became the top Indian Pop album. The songs "Jatt Da Muqabala", "Badfella" and "Dawood" were ranked No. 11, 24, and 26 on UK Asian Music Chart by OCC. Songs "Jatt Da Muqabala", "Badfella" and "Selfmade" also featured in Apple Music 2010s Punjabi essentials playlist.

== Charts ==
Chart (2018)	Peak position
Canadian Albums (Billboard)	66

=== Songs ===
Title	Chart (2018)	Peak position
"Jatt Da Muqabala"	UK Asian (OCC)	11
"Badfella"	UK Asian (OCC)	24
"Dawood"	UK Asian (OCC)	26

== Accolades ==
- Best Album - Brit Asia Music Awards
