= Byg Byrd =

Record producer

- Also known as: byG Byrd
- Born: Maninder Singh Kalyan
- Origin: Toronto, Ontario, Canada
- Occupation: Record producer
- Years active: 2012-present
- Label: Brown Boy Records
- Member of: Brown Boys
- Members: Big Boi Deep; Tarna; Blamo
- Past members: Sidhu Moose Wala; Sunny Malton

Maninder Singh Kalyan, professionally known as Byg Byrd is an Indo-Canadian record producer and record executive. He is also associated with Punjabi music. He produced for variety of artists notably French Montana, Chinx Drugz, Lil Kim, Lil Durk and Jim Jones, along with Punjabi artists including Sidhu Moose Wala, Tarsem Jassar, Sunny Malton, Jazzy B and Prem Dhillon.

He rose to mainstream with his track 'So High' and 'Issa Jatt' with Sidhu Moose Wala. He is also the co-founder of Brown Boys, which he founded with rapper Sunny Malton (left in 2021).

== Early life ==
Byrd is from Toronto, Canada and was born into a Canadian Punjabi Sikh family and he attended Mississauga Secondary School Byrd's family is originally from Hoshiarpur district in Punjab, India.

In May 2022, Byrd launched his own Vodka line called Brown Boys Vodka.

== Career ==
=== Early career ===
Byg Byrd started making music within the hip-hop scene which eventually led him to work on the song "100" in 2012, which featured French Montana, Cheeze, and Chinx Drugz on the album Coke Boys 3. He also worked on the song "Soulful" which featured French Montana and Lil Durk on Coke Boys 4.

=== Rise to fame ===
In August 2017, Byrd and Moosewala released "So High" which became their most successful track. He can also been seen throughout the music video along with Sunny Malton, which was shot in Toronto.

In 2017, Byrd produced "Just Listen" by Sidhu Moosewala. The song managed to reach 12th in the UK Asian Charts.[11] Other significant Byrd collaborations and features include "East Side Flow" (2019), "Sidhu's Anthem" (2019), Forget About it (2019) "Chosen" (2019), "B-Town (2019)", "Hauli Hauli" (2019) and Homicide (2019) and "Never Fold" (2022).

Byrd also produced 3 songs on Moosewala's album, PBX 1 which debuted 66 on the Billboard Canadian Albums Chart. The album also reached the top spot on iTunes and became the top Indian Pop album.

In 2020, Byrd has also collaborated with veteran Punjabi singer, Jazzy B on the song "Putt Sardara De".

In 2022, Byrd collaborated with Happy Singh on the song "Ko Ni Tera Yaar".

=== Feud with Sidhu Moosewala & Sunny Malton ===
The initial Brown Boys feud started between Moosewala and Sunny Malton, Byg Byrd and BigBoiDeep after their release of the album Brown Boys Forever. On Instagram, Byrd and Malton said Sidhu Moosewala was not paying them and was "leaking" their songs. Moosewala responded with "I am ready to swear on anything religious. Putting my hand on my heart I am ready to say that if I have ever leaked any song of mine, I want my tongue to be held and I will stop singing."

In December 2020 and January 2021, Byg Byrd and Malton got into a serious internet feud over ownership of Brown Boys Records. Despite being equal partners, Malton claimed his personal relationship was suffering for the last 4–5 months and that BygByrd signed artist, Tarna without his permission under alias of Brown Boys.

==== Reaction to Moosewala's death ====
Byrd lauded the influence of Sidhu and the initial trio on the broader Punjabi music scene, while also expressing his condolences to Sidhu and his family. He revealed that he refrained from speaking earlier because he believed it was neither appropriate timing nor his position to do so.

== Musical style ==
Byg Byrd is known for his unique style of music, which blends Punjabi folk music with Hip-Hop. He often incorporates traditional Punjabi instruments such as the tumbi, flutes and dhol into his tracks.

== Album discography ==
=== Studio album ===
Title	Details
Brown Boys Forever	Released: August 23, 2019; Label: Brown Boys Record; Format: Digital download, streaming

== Singles discography ==
=== As lead artist ===
Track	Year	Peak chart position		Label	Album
Track	Year	UK Asian	UK Punjabi	Label	Album
Dollar (with Sidhu Moose Wala)	2018	9	—	White Hill Music	Dakuan Da Munda (soundtrack)
"Thang on Me" (with AR Paisley)	2019	—	—	Brown Boys Records	Brown Boys Forever
"Hauli Hauli" (with Sidhu Moose Wala)	2019	—	—	Brown Boys Records	Brown Boys Forever
"The Bad Guy"	2019	—	—	Brown Boys Records	Brown Boys Forever
Patt Sutteya (with Big Boi Deep)	2019	—	—	Brown Boys Records	Brown Boys Forever
Hanji Hanji (with Big Boi Deep & Deepak Dhillon)	2019	—	—	Brown Boys Records	Brown Boys Forever
"Think About Me" (with Big Boi Deep & AR Paisley)	2019	—	—	Brown Boys Records	Brown Boys Forever
"Imma Imma Brown Boy" (with Big Boi Deep)	2019	—	—	Brown Boys Records	Brown Boys Forever
"Sanu Koi Ni Fikar"	2019	—	—	Brown Boys Records	Brown Boys Forever
Schema (with Big Boi Deep)	2021	40	—	Brown Boys Records	
Ill Minds (with Big Boi Deep featuring Tarna)	2021	—		Brown Boys Records	
Limits (with Big Boi Deep)	2021	—		Brown Boys Records	
Unbreakable (with Tarna and Big Boi Deep)	2021		—	Brown Boys Records	
All Winners (with Ali Kulture, Big Boi Deep and Juicy J)	2021	—		Brown Boys Records	
Bentley (with Tarna)	2022		—	Brown Boys Records	
94 Flow (with Big Boi Deep)	2022		—	Brown Boys Records	
Hail (with Tarna)	2023	—		Brown Boys Records	Nothing To Prove
