= Yes I Am Student =

- Directed by: Tarnvir Singh Jagpal
- Written by: Gill Raunta
- Produced by: Tarnvir Singh Jagpal
- Starring: Sidhu Moosewala; Mandy Takhar
- Cinematography: Ravi Kumar Sana
- Edited by: Gagan Sachdeva
- Music by: Intense; The Kidd
- Production company: Tarn Jagpal Films
- Distributed by: Tarn Jagpal Films
- Release date: 22 October 2021
- Running time: 112 minutes
- Country: India
- Language: Punjabi

Yes I Am Student is a 2021 Indian Punjabi language film directed and produced by Tarnvir Singh Jagpal. It stars Sidhu Moose Wala, Mandy Takhar and Gill Raunta. The film is written by Gill Raunta. The film was released on 22 October 2021. This film marked Moose Wala's final film in his lifetime before his assassination on 29 May 2022.

== Cast ==
- Sidhu Moosewala as Jass Gill
- Mandy Takhar as Reet
- Gill Raunta as Heera
- Jaggi Singh
- Naginder Gakhar as Baldev
- Malkit Rauni as Jarnail Singh
- Seema Kaushal as Jass Gill's mother
- Deep Mandian
- Raj Kakra as Builder (Cameo appearance)
- Harjinder Singh Thind as Radio Jockey
- Bhavkhandan Singh Rakhra as Professor

== Plot ==
A young man leaves his motherland to study abroad and search for a better future in Canada.

== Production ==
=== Development ===
In November 2018 Director Tarnvir Singh Jagpal announced a new film ‘Yes I Am A Student’

=== Filming ===
On 27 August 2019, principal photography began Filming was completed on 4 March 2020.

== Soundtrack ==
Yes I am Student

Soundtrack album by The Kidd & Intense
- Released: September 2021
- Recorded: 2019–2021
- Genre: Feature film soundtrack
- Length: 23:46
- Label: Tips Punjabi
- Producers: The Kidd, Intense

The soundtrack of the film are composed by Sidhu Moose Wala, The Kidd, Intense, Gurtaj and Barbie Mann. They consisted of six songs.

Tracklist
No.	Title	Lyrics	Music	Artist(s)	Length
1.	"Athra Style"	Sidhu Moose Wala	The Kidd	Sidhu Moose Wala, Jenny Johal	4:00
2.	"Yaariyaan"	Sidhu	The Kidd	Sidhu	3:12
3.	"Saab"	Happy Malhi; Sidhu	The Kidd	Sidhu; Gurtaj	3:23
4.	"Jaan"	Sidhu	Intense	Sidhu	3:56
5.	"Pyaar"	Gill Raunta	The Kidd	Barbee Mann, Tarnvir Singh Jagpal	3:28
6.	"Baapu"	Sidhu	Intense	Sidhu	5:46
Total length:					23:45

== Reception ==
The Times of India gave three out of five stars, stating that "In the movie, there are a number of other characters who played significant roles. For instance, there were students who mirrored the exact image that people with a bias against international students had. They used to burn the money sent by their parents on expensive cars, drugs, clubbing, and more. Thereafter, there was Jassa’s friend, Heera, who made sure to stand by him in every thick and thin, and also made him understand the difference between right and wrong. Last but not least, Jassa’s uncle showed us the image of the so-called relatives who promise to have our back all the time, but never live by their words" Cinestaan.com wrote that, "Yes I Am Student has its heart in the right place and draws attention to an oft-neglected yet crucial issue. It's also nice to see Moosewala's film actively shunning alcohol and drug usage, drawing awareness about the social evil and sending a positive message to viewers."
