= PTC Punjabi Film Awards 2019 =

9th PTC Punjabi Film Awards
- Trophy
- Presented by: PTC Punjabi
- Date: March 16, 2019
- Hosted by: Sonu Sood; Divya Dutta; Manish Paul; Gurnam Bhullar; Gavy Chahal
- Official website: Official website

Highlights
- Best Film: Carry On Jatta 2
- Best Non-feature Film: Riha
- Best Actor (critics): Amrinder Gill; Ashke
- Best Actor: Gippy Grewal; Carry On Jatta 2
- Best Actress: Sargun Mehta; Qismat
- Best Critic: Qismat
- Most awards: Carry On Jatta 2, Qismat, Laung Laachi and Sajjan Singh Rangroot (4)
- Most nominations: Qismat (10)

Television coverage
- Channel: PTC Punjabi
- Network: PTC Network

The 9th PTC Punjabi Film Awards ceremony, presented by PTC Punjabi, honored the best Punjabi films of 2018, and took place at JLPL Ground, Mohali on 16 March 2019. The ceremony was conducted by Sonu Sood, Divya Dutta, Manish Paul, Gavy Chahal and Gurnam Bhullar.

== Winners ==
Winners are listed first, highlighted in boldface, and indicated with a double dagger (‡).

**Best Picture**: **Carry On Jatta 2**‡; Daana Paani – Karaj Gill; Golak Bugni Bank Te Batua – Karaj Gill; Harjeeta; Laatu; Laung Laachi; Parahuna; Sajjan Singh Rangroot; Vadhayiyaan Ji Vadhayiyaan	**Best Director**: **Smeep Kang – Carry on Jatta 2**‡; Amberdeep Singh – Laung Laachi; Jagdeep Sidhu – Qismat; Ksshitij Chaudhary – Golak Bugni Bank Te Batua; Pankaj Batra- Sajjan Singh Rangroot; Rakesh Mehta – Rang Punjab; Simerjit Singh – Mar Gaye Oye Loko; Tarnvir Singh Jagpal – Daana Paani; Vijay Kumar Arora – Harjeeta
**Best Actor**: **Gippy Grewal – Carry On Jatta 2**‡; Ammy Virk – Harjeeta; Amrinder Gill – Ashke; Binnu Dhillon -Vadhayiyaan Ji Vadhayiyaan; Dev Kharoud – Dakuaan Da Munda; Diljit Dosanjh – Sajjan Singh Rangroot; Harish Verma – Golak Bugni Bank Te Batua; Jimmy Shergill – Daana Paani; Tarsem Jassar – Afsar	**Best Actress**: **Sargun Mehta – Qismat**‡; Aditi Sharma – Laatu; Kavita Kaushik – Vadhayiyaan Ji Vadhayiyaan; Neeru Bajwa – Laung Laachi; Simi Chahal – Golak Bugni Bank Te Batua; Sonam Bajwa – Carry On Jatta 2
**Best Debut Director**: **Jagdeep Sidhu – Qismat**‡; Manav Shah – Laatu; Nav Bajwa – Raduaa; Rana Ranbir – Asees; Taj – Punjab Singh; Vijay Kumar – Harjeeta	**Best Debut Male**: **Amberdeep Singh – Laung Laachi**‡; Gagan Kokri – Laatu; Kulwinder Billa – Parahuna; Preet Bath – Kande; Ravinder Pawar – Saggi Phull

== Nominees ==
Below are the category-wise nomination list.

Best Background Score
Artist	Film
Gurmeet Singh, Sandeep Saxena	Laung Laachi
Gurmeet Singh, Sandeep Saxena	Qismat
Jaidev Kumar	Daana Paani
Jatinder Shah	Laatu
Raju Singh	Harjeeta
Salil Amrute	Dakuaan Da Munda
Surender Sodhi	Carry on Jatta 2
Troy Arif	Sajjan Singh Rangroot

Best Story
Artist	Film
Dheeraj Rattan	Golak Bugni Bank Te Batua
Jagdeep Sidhu	Qismat
Jass Grewal	Daana Paani
Manav Shah	Laatu
Rana Ranbir	Asees

Best Cinematography
Artist	Film
Akashdeep Pandey	Laatu
Maneesh Chandra Bhatt	Mar Gaye Oye Loko
Neekhil B Joshi, Nishant Gupta	Sajjan Singh Rangroot
Ravi Kumar Sana	Daana Paani
Rajeev Shrivastava	Harjeeta
STEPHAN BOOKAS	Rang Punjab

Best Screenplay
S.NO	Artist	Film	SMS code
1	Dheeraj Rattan	Golak Bugni Bank Te Batua	PFASP1
2	Jagdeep Sidhu	Qismat	PFASP2
3	Jagdeep Sidhu	Harjeeta	PFASP3
4	Pankaj Batra, Gurpreet Singh Palheri	Sajjan Singh Rangroot	PFASP4
5	Vaibhav Suman, Shreya Srivastava	Carry on Jatta 2	PFASP5

Best DIALOGUES
S.NO	Artist	Film	SMS code
1	Jagdeep Sidhu	Qismat	PFADG1
2	Naresh Kathoria	Carry On Jatta 2	PFADG2
3	Pali Bhupinder Singh	Laavan Phere	PFADG3
4	Rakesh Dhawan	vadhaiyan ji vadhaiyan	PFADG4
5	Rakesh Dhawan	Golak Bugni Bank Te Batua	PFADG5
6	Rana Ranbir	Asees	PFADG6
7	Surmeet Mavi	Laatu	PFADG7

Best Music Director
S.NO	Artist	Song	Film	SMS code
1	B Praak	Kaun Hoyega	Qismat	PFAMD1
2	Gurmeet Singh	Laung Laachi	Laung Laachi	PFAMD2
3	Jaidev Kumar	Daana Paani	Daana Paani	PFAMD3
4	Jatinder Shah	Roti	Sajjan Singh Rangroot	PFAMD4
5	Jatinder Shah	Tu Te Main	Golak Bugni Bank Te Batua	PFAMD5
6	Preet Hundal	Ishq Jeha Ho Gya	Afsar	PFASP6

Best Playback Singer (Female)
S.NO	Lyricist	Song	Film	SMS code
1	Jyotica Tangri	Kanda Kanchiya	DAANA PAANI	PFAPF1
2	Mannat Noor	Kinna Pyar	Harjeeta	PFAPF2
3	Mannat Noor	Laung Laachi	Laung Laachi	PFAPF3
4	Nimrat Khaira	Khat	Afsar	PFAPF4
5	Nooran Sisters	Mahiya Chhadin Naa	Saagi Phull	PFAPF5

Best Playback Singer (Male)
S.NO	Artist	Song	Film	SMS code
1	Ammy Virk	Chan Di Chawaani	Harjeeta	PFAPM1
2	Amrinder Gill	Aisi Taisi	GOLAK BUGNI BANK TE BATUA	PFAPM2
3	Bir Singh	Chunni Cho Asmaan	Bhajjo Veero Ve	PFAPM3
4	Diljit Dosanjh	Pyaas	Sajjan Singh Rangroot	PFAPM4
5	Feroz Khan	Soortan	Raduaa	PFAPM5
6	Gippy Grewal	Kurta Chadra	Carry On Jatta 2	PFAPM6
7	Harbhajan Maan	Maavan	Daana Paani	PFAPM7
8	Kamal Khan	Awaaz	Qismat	PFAPM8
9	Prabh Gill	Rabb Khair Kare	Daana Paani	PFAPM9
10	Sharry Maan	Akhia Di Bhatkan	Marriage Palace	PFAPM10

Best Song of the Year
S.NO	Song	Film	SMS code
1	28 Kille	Laavan Phere	PFASG1
2	Handsome Jatta	Askhe	Channa Mereya
3	Laung Laachi	Laung Laachi	PFASG3
4	Mar Gaye Oye Loko	Mar Gaye Oye Loko	PFASG4
5	Peepa	Sajjan Singh Rangroot	PFASG5
6	Sefie	Golak Bugni Bank Te Batua	PFASG6
7	Vadhaiyan Ji Vadhaiyan	Vadhaiyan Ji Vadhaiyan	PFASG7

Best Performance In Comic
S.NO	Artist	Film	SMS code
1	B N Sharma	Golak Bugni Bank Te Batua	PFACR1
2	Binnu Dhillon	Mar Gaye Oye Loko	PFACR2
3	Gurpreet Ghuggi	Laavan Phere	PFACR3
4	Harby Sangha	Marriage Palace	PFACR4
5	Jarnail singh	Sajjan Singh Rangroot	PFACR5
6	Jaswinder Bhalla	Vadhaiyan Ji Vadhaiyan	PFACR6
7	Karamjit Anmol	Mr & Mrs 420 Returns	PFACR7

Best Performance In Negative
S.NO	Artist	Film	SMS code
1	Hobby Dhaliwal	Titanic	PFANR1
2	Kartar Cheema	Rang Punjab	PFANR2
3	Kuljinder Sidhu	Punjab Singh	PFANR3
4	Rahul Jungral	Laatu	PFANR4
5	Sardar Sohi	Asees	PFANR5
6	Yograj Singh	Kande	PFANR6

Best Action
S.NO	Artist	Film	SMS code
1	Javed Ezez	Jagga Jiunda	PFAAN1
2	K Ganesh Kumar	Punjab Singh	PFAAN2
3	Kinder Singh	Dakuaan Da Munda	PFAAN3
4	Sham Kaushal	Sajjan Singh Rangroot	PFAAN4
5	Surender Sharma	Yaar Belly	PFAAN5
6	Tinu Verma	Rang Punjab	PFAAN6

Best Supporting Actress
S.NO	Artist	Film	SMS code
1	ANITA DEVGAN	Golak Bugni Bank Te Batua	PFASS1
2	ANITA MEET	Dakuaan Da Munda	PFASS2
3	Gurpreet Bhangu	Dhol Ratti	PFASS3
4	Nirmal Rishi	Vadda Kalakaar	PFASS4
5	Nisha Bano	Ranjha Refugee	PFASS5
6	Roopi Gill	Askhe	PFASS6
7	Rupinder Rupi	Asees	PFASS7
8	Upasana Singh	Carry On Jatta 2	PFASS8

Best Supporting Actor
S.NO	Artist	Film	SMS code
1	Ammy Virk	Laung Laachi	PFASA1
2	Guggu Gill	Qismat	PFASA2
3	Gurmeet Sajjan	Kurmaiyaan	PFASA3
4	Gurpreet Ghuggi	Carry On Jatta 2	PFASA4
5	Hardeep Gill	Bhajjo Veero Ve	PFASA5
6	Sarabjit Cheema	Ashke	PFASA6
7	Yograj Singh	Sajjan Singh Rangroot	PFASA7

Best DEBUT FEMALE
S.NO	Artist	Film	SMS code
1	Kamal Khangura	Titanic	PFADF1
2	Khushi Malhotra	Jatt VS ILTS	PFADF2
3	Sanjeeda Sheikh	Ashke	PFADF3
4	Sawan Rupowali	Harjeeta	PFADF4
5	Sunanda Sharma	Sajjan Singh Rangroot	PFADF5

Best DEBUT MALE
S.NO	Artist	Film	SMS code
1	Amberdeep singh	Laung Laachi	PFADM1
2	Gagan Kokri	Laatu	PFADM2
3	Kulwinder Billa	Prahune	PFADM3
4	Preet Bath	Kande	PFADM4
5	Ravinder Pawar	Saggi Phull	PFADM5

Best DEBUT DIRECTOR
S.NO	Artist	Film	SMS code
1	Jagdeep Sidhu	Qismat	PFADD1
2	Manav Shah	Laatu	PFADD2
3	Nav Bajwa	Raduaa	PFADD3
4	Rana Ranbir	Asees	PFADD4
5	Taj	Punjab Singh	PFADD5
6	Vijay Kumar	Harjeeta	PFADD6
7	NEERU BAJWA	SARGI	PFADD 07

BEST Director
S.NO	Artist	Film	SMS code
1	Amberdeep singh	Laung Laachi	PFABD1
2	Jagdeep Sidhu	Qismat	PFABD2
3	Ksshitij Chaudhary	Golak Bugni Bank Te Batua	PFABD3
4	Pankaj Batra	Sajjan Singh Rangroot	PFABD4
5	Rakesh Mehta	Rang Punjab	PFABD5
6	Sameep Kang	Carry On Jatta 2	PFABD6
7	Simerjit Singh	Mar Gaye Oye Loko	PFABD7
8	Tarnvir Singh Jagpal	Daana Paani	PFABD8
9	Vijay Kumar Arora	Harjeeta	PFABD9

BEST ACTRESS
S.NO	Artist	Film	SMS code
1	Aditi Sharma	Laatu	PFABS1
2	Kavita Kaushik	vadhaiyan ji vadhaiyan	PFABS2
3	Neeru Bajwa	Laung Laachi	PFABS3
4	Sargun Mehta	Qismat	PFABS4
5	Simi Chahal	Golak Bugni Bank Te Batua	PFABS5
6	SONAM BAJWA	Carry On Jatta 2	PFABS6

BEST ACTOR
S.NO	Artist	Film	SMS code
1	AMMY VIRK	Harjeeta	PFABA1
2	AMRINDER GILL	Askhe	PFABA2
3	BINNU DHILLON	Vadhaiyan ji Vadhaiyan	PFABA3
4	Dev Kharoud	Dakuaan Da Munda	PFABA4
5	DILJIT DOSANJH	Sajjan Singh Rangroot	PFABA5
6	Gippy Grewal	Carry On Jatta 2	PFABA6
7	Harish Verma	Golak Bugni Bank Te Batua	PFABA7
8	Jimmy Shergill	Daana Paani	PFABA8
9	Tarsem Jassar	Afsar	PFABA9

BEST FILM
S.NO	FILM	SMS code
1	Carry On Jatta 2	PFABF1
2	Daana Paani	PFABF2
3	Golak Bugni Bank Te Batua	PFABF3
4	Harjeeta	PFABF4
5	Laatu	PFABF5
6	Laung Laachi	PFABF6
7	Parahuna	PFABF7
8	Sajjan Singh Rangroot	PFABF8
9	Vadhaiyan ji Vadhaiyan	PFABF9

Best of PTC Box Office Film
S.NO	Film	Director	SMS code
1	Addhi Chhutti Sari	Sumit Dutt	PFABO1
2	MAAT	Jasraj Singh Bhatti	PFABO2
3	CHITTHI	Gaurav Rana	PFABO3
4	Raavi Paar	Param Shiv	PFABO4
5	Riha	Gaurav Rana	PFABO5
