= List of Punjabi films of 2018 =

This is a list of Punjabi films of 2018.

== Box office ==
Rank	Movie	Director	Production House / Studio	Worldwide Gross (Original)	Source
1	Carry on Jatta 2	Smeep Kang	White Hill Studio, A & A Advisors	₹56.3 crore (US$6.0 million)	
2	Qismat	Jagdeep Sidhu	Shri Narotam Productions	₹30 crore (US$3.2 million)	
3	Sajjan Singh Rangroot	Pankaj Batra	Vivid Art House	₹25.5 crore (US$2.7 million)	
4	Vadhayiyaan Ji Vadhayiyaan	Smeep Kang	A & A Advisors	₹20.2 crore (US$2.1 million)	
5	Mar Gaye Oye Loko	Simerjit Singh	Humble Motion Pictures	₹20.1 crore (US$2.1 million)	
6	Golak Bugni Bank Te Batua	Ksshitij Chaudhary	Rhythm Boyz Entertainment	₹18.2 crore (US$1.9 million)	
7	Ashke	Amberdeep Singh	Rhythm Boyz Entertainment	₹18 crore (US$1.9 million)	
8	Laavan Phere	Smeep Kang	Karamjit Anmol Productions	₹16 crore (US$1.7 million)	
9	Laung Laachi	Amberdeep Singh	Villagers Film Studio	₹16 crore (US$1.7 million)	
10	Dakuaan Da Munda	Mandeep Benipal	Dreamreality	est.₹15.5 crore (US$1.6 million)	
11	Subedar Joginder Singh	Simerjit Singh	Seven Colors Motion Pictures	₹14.5 crore (US$1.5 million)	
12	Parahuna	Amrit Raj Chadha	Dara Films Entertainment	₹12.5 crore (US$1.3 million)	
13	Mr & Mrs 420 Returns	Ksshitij Chaudhary	Friday Russh Motion Pictures	₹11 crore (US$1.2 million)	
14	Daana Paani	Taranvir Singh Jagpal	Rhythm Boyz Entertainment	₹10 crore (US$1.1 million)	
15	Afsar	Gulshan Singh	Nadar Films	₹9 crore (US$950,000)	
16	Aate Di Chidi	Harry Bhatti	Teg Productions	₹7 crore (US$740,000)	
17	Harjeeta	Vijay Kumar Arora	Villagers Film Studio	₹6.5 crore (US$690,000)	
18	Bhajjo Veero Ve	Amberdeep Singh	Rhythm Boyz Entertainment	₹6 crore (US$630,000)	

== List of films ==
Opening		Title	Director	Cast	Genre	Producer	Ref
J A N	19	Saggi Phull	Shivtar Shiv	Ravinder Pawar, Amitoz Shergill, Preet Simran, Shavinder Mahal, Neetu Pandher	Drama	Legend Motion Pictures	
J A N	19	Punjab Singh	Taj	Gurjind Maan, Sarthi K, Kuljinder Sidhu, Anita Devgan, Yaad Grewal	Action	Big Heights Motion Pictures and PBR Entertainments	
F E B	2	Bhagat Singh Di Udeek	Shivamm Sharma	Sardar Sohi, Arsh Chawla, B.N. Sharma, Malkit Rauni, Surbhi Singla	Drama	Virendra Pal Singh Kalra, Avijeet Singh Kalra	
F E B	9	Laavaan Phere	Smeep Kang	Roshan Prince, Rubina Bajwa	Comedy	Karamjit Anmol, Rajiv Singla, Prem Parkash Gupta	
M A R	9	Laung Laachi	Amberdeep Singh	Ammy Virk, Neeru Bajwa, Amberdeep Singh, Amrit Maan	Comedy, Action	Bhagwant Virk, Nav Virk	
M A R	23	Sajjan Singh Rangroot	Pankaj Batra	Diljit Dosanjh, Sunanda Sharma, Yograj Singh, Darren Tassell	War	Color 9 Production	
M A R	23	Nanak	Rakesh Mehta	Jassi Gill, Japji Khaira, Diljott, Sardar Sohi, Anita Devgun		Raj Kundra	Not released yet
A P R	6	Subedar Joginder Singh	Simerjit Singh	Gippy Grewal, Aditi Sharma, Guggu Gill, Kulwinder Billa	Drama, War	Seven Color Motion Pictures	
A P R	13	Golak Bugni Bank Te Batua	Ksshitij Chaudhary	Amrinder Gill, Harish Verma, Simi Chahal	Comedy	Rhythm Boyz Entertainment, Hayre Omji Studios	
A P R	20	Khido Khundi	Rohit Jugraj	Ranjit Bawa, Mandy Takhar, Naaz Norouzi, Manav Vij	Sport, Drama	Alwinder Hayre, Kavanjit Hayre, Sagoon Wagh, Rohit Jugraj	
A P R	20	Kande	Kavi Raz	Yograj Singh, B.N. Sharma, Sunita Dhir, Jeet Rudka			
M A Y	4	Daana Paani	Taranveer Singh Jagpal	Jimmy Shergill, Simi Chahal	Drama	Shri Narotam Ji films, Nanokey Studios	
M A Y	11	Raduaa	Nav Bajwa	Nav Bajwa, Gurpreet Ghuggi	Science Fiction		
M A Y	18	Harjeeta	Vijay Kumar Arora	Ammy Virk	Biography	Nick Bahl, Munish Sahni, Bhagwant Virk	
J U N	1	Carry on Jatta 2	Smeep Kang	Gippy Grewal, Gurpreet Ghuggi, Jaswinder Bhalla, Binnu Dhillon, Karamjit Anmol, B.N. Sharma	Comedy		
J U N	22	Asees	Rana Ranbir	Rana Ranbir	Drama	Lucky Sandhu, Baldev Singh Bath	
J U L	6	Nankana	Manjeet Maan	Gurdas Maan, Kavita Kaushik	Drama	Unisys Infosolutions	
J U L	13	Vadhayiyaan Ji Vadhayiyaan	Smeep Kang	Binnu Dhillon, Kavita Kaushik, Gurpreet Ghuggi, Karamjit Anmol	Comedy	A & A Advisors	
J U L	27	Ishq Na Hove Rabba	Sukhdeep Sukhi	Navjeet, Youngveer, Sezal Sharma, Yuvleen Kaur, Bhotu Shah, Neetu Phander	Comedy	Kapil Batra Productions	
J U L	27	Ashke	Amberdeep Singh	Amrinder Gill, Sanjeeda Sheikh, Jaswinder Bhalla, Hobby Dhaliwal, Gurshabad	Bhangra	Rhythm Boyz Entertainment	
A U G	3	Jagga Jiunda E	Amit Singh	Daljeet Kalsi, Kainaat Arora, Karamjit Anmol, Harp Farmer, Yograj Singh	Action, Drama, Comedy		
A U G	10	Dakuaan Da Munda	Mandeep Benipal	Dev Kharoud, Jagjeet Sandhu, Pooja Verma	Action, Drama		
A U G	15	Mr & Mrs 420 Returns	Ksshitij Chaudhary	Ranjit Bawa, Jassi Gill, Payal Rajput, Karamjit Anmol, Gurpreet Ghuggi, Jaswinder Bhalla	Comedy	Friday Russh Motion Pictures	
A U G	24	Guru Da Banda	Jassi Chana		Animated Historical Drama		
A U G	31	Mar Gaye Oye Loko	Simerjit Singh	Gippy Grewal, Karamjit Anmol	Comedy	Humble Motion Pictures	
S E P	14	Kurmaiyan	Gurmeet Saajan, Manjeet Singh Tony	Harjit Harman, Japji Khaira, Gurmeet Saajan, Parminder Gill	Comedy	Gurmeet Saajan, Gurmail Brar	
S E P	21	Qismat	Jagdeep Sidhu	Ammy Virk, Sargun Mehta, Guggu Gill, Mandeep Mani	Drama	Shri Narotam Ji Films	
S E P	28	Parahuna	Amrit Raj Chadha	Kulwinder Billa, Wamiqa Gabbi, Nirmal Rishi	Comedy	Dara Films Entertainment	
O C T	5	Afsar	Gulshan	Tarsem Jassar, Nimrat Khaira, Nirmal Rishi, Gurpreet Ghuggi	Drama	Vehli Janta Films	
O C T	12	Son Of Manjeet Singh	Vikram Grover	Gurpreet Ghuggi, Japji Khaira, B.N. Sharma, Karamjit Anmol	Drama	K9 Films	
O C T	19	Aate Di Chidi	Harry Bhatti	Amrit Maan, Neeru Bajwa, Gurpreet Ghuggi, Karamjit Anmol, Sardar Sohi	Drama, Comedy	Teg Productions	
O C T	26	Ranjha Refugee	Avtar Singh	Roshan Prince, Saanvi Dhiman, Karamjit Anmol	Drama	J.B. Movie Productions	
N O V	16	Laatu	Manav Shah	Gagan Kokri, Aditi Sharma, Sardar Sohi, Rahul Jungral	Period, Drama		
N O V	23	Marriage Palace	Sunit Thakur	Sharry Mann, Payal Rajput		Happy Goyal Pictures	
N O V	23	Rang Panjab	Rakesh Mehta	Deep Sidhu, Reena Rai, Jagjeet Sandhu, Dheeraj Kumar, Baninder Bunny	Action	Raj Kundra Productions	
N O V	30	Chan Tara	Vinit Atwal	Daljit Arora, Nav Bajwa, Arvinder Bhatti, Parminder Gill		Navneet Singh	
D E C	7	Dulla Vaily	Devi Sharma	Guggu Gill, Yograj Singh, Gurvar Cheema, Aakanksha Sareen, Neet Mahal	Crime, Action, Romance		
D E C	7	Banjara	Mushtaq Pasha	Babbu Maan, Rana Ranbir, Shraddha Arya, Jiya Mustafa, Gurpreet Bhangu	Drama	Babbu Maan Films	
D E C	14	Bhajjo Veero Ve	Amberdeep Singh	Amberdeep Singh, Simi Chahal, Nirmal Rishi, Guggu Gill		Rhythm Boyz Entertainment	
D E C	14	Yaar Belly	Sukhjinder Shera	Dev Kharoud, Sabby Suri, Karamjit Anmol, Gurpreet Bhangu, Parminder Gill		Vinay Jindal	

== See also ==
- List of Punjabi films of 2019
- Highest grossing Punjabi films
