= Zee Studios =

- Logo used from 2025
- Type: Private
- Industry: Entertainment
- Founded: 2012; 14 years ago
- Headquarters: Mumbai, Maharashtra, India
- Products: Films; Music
- Services: Film production; Film distribution; Music Record label; Film promotion
- Owner: Zee Entertainment Enterprises

Zee Studios is an Indian film production and distribution company, that specialises in film, streaming, and television, content development and production. It also specialises in film marketing and distribution. It is based in Mumbai, India, and it was established in 2012 as the content engine for Zee Entertainment Enterprises Limited.

== History ==
Zee Studios was founded in 2012 and was formerly known as Essel Vision Productions. Before the establishment of Zee Studios, films were produced under the name Zee Telefilms. Gadar: Ek Prem Katha, released in 2001, directed by Anil Sharma and starring Sunny Deol and Ameesha Patel, was one of the first films produced by Zee Telefilms. The film was declared an All-Time Blockbuster by Box Office India and ranked among the top 3 Indian films in all-time highest footfalls since the 1990s.

=== 2015–2020 ===
The first-ever film produced under the banner of Zee Studios was Sanjay Gupta’s thriller suspense Jazbaa in the year 2015, which starred Aishwarya Rai Bachchan alongside Irrfan Khan and Shabana Azmi. For her performance in the film, Aishwarya Rai Bachchan won the Stardust Award for Power-Packed Performance of the Year (2015).

In the same year (2015), Zee Studios forayed into regional cinema with a Marathi film, Katyar Kaljat Ghusali, an epic musical drama. It starred Shankar Mahadevan, Sachin Pilgaonkar, Subodh Bhave, Pushkar Shrotri, Mrunmayee Deshpande and Amruta Khanvilkar in the lead roles. The film marked the directorial debut of Subodh Bhave, the theatrical acting debut of Shankar Mahadevan, and Sakshi Tanwar's Marathi film debut. The critics regarded the film as a rich treasure of music and was also a huge success at the box office. The film won the National Award for Best Male Playback Singer (Mahesh Kale). Katyar Kaljat Ghusali was selected to be screened at the 46th International Film Festival of India in Goa and was considered for the United Nations Educational, Scientific and Cultural Organisation (UNESCO) Fellini medal that year.

In 2016 the company produced Natsamrat starring Nana Patekar and Medha Manjrekar, which portrayed a tragic story of a stage actor. In the same year, the studio also released the Marathi-language romantic tragedy film Sairat, directed and produced by Nagraj Manjule. It was lauded by media outlets such as The Hindu, The Wire, HuffPost, The Quint, and more, and highly appreciated by critics. For the first time in the history of the Marathi film industry, three songs for the film were recorded at the Sony Scoring Stage in Los Angeles. The production included 66 instrumentalists at an expenditure of over Rs. 75 lakhs. Sairat's music went on to become a sensation throughout the country after the release of the film. The film received several accolades both regionally and nationally, including 11 awards at the 2017 Filmfare Marathi Awards. It won Best Film, Best Director (Nagraj Manjule), Best Actress (Rinku Rajguru), and Best Music Album at Filmfare. Rinku Rajguru and Akash Thosar won in the best debut female and male categories, respectively. The film also premiered at the 66th Berlin International Film Festival, where it received a standing ovation. Rajguru received the National Film Award – Special Mention at the 63rd National Film Awards. Sairat is the highest-grossing Marathi movie to date.

In the following year, Zee Studios witnessed success with its Marathi features; Ti Saddhya Kay Karte, a Marathi-language romantic drama directed by Satish Rajwade. Chi Va Chi Sau Ka, a Marathi-language comedy-drama, ran for over 100 days in many Maharashtra cities. Faster Fene, produced by Riteish Deshmukh, Genelia Deshmukh, and Mangesh Kulkarni and starring Girish Kulkarni, was another Marathi language film co-produced by the company that did well in Maharashtra.

In its Hindi line-up, the studio released Mom, starring Sridevi in the lead role, which received rave reviews from critics.

In October 2017, the company released a musical drama, Secret Superstar, starring Aamir Khan and Zaira Wasim, in 1,100 theatres and on 28,401 screens worldwide, with 1090 screens overseas. Soon after its release, the film went on to become one of the most profitable films of all time. The film is also the highest-grossing Indian film featuring a female protagonist, the highest-grossing Hindi film of 2017, the seventh-highest-grossing Indian film worldwide, and the second-highest-grossing Indian film overseas. Overall the film won three Filmfare Awards, including Best Actress (Critics) for Zaira Wasim, Best Supporting Actress for Vij, and Best Playback Singer (Female) for Meghna Mishra. Zaira Wasim also won the National Child Award for Exceptional Achievement for her performance in the film. The company also released Qarib Qarib Singlle the same year starring Irrfan Khan and debuting in Hindi Cinema, Malayalam actress Parvathy Thiruvothu, which received favourable reviews from critics.

Meanwhile, owing to the rise of over-the-top, subscription-based media services, Zee Entertainment launched its video streaming service on February 14, 2018. ZEE5 would use this to stream all Zee Entertainment content, from films to shows.

Zee Studios commenced the year 2018 by releasing the Marathi comedy-drama, Gulabjaam, which performed averagely in the cinemas and went on to stream on ZEE5. The company also produced Beyond the Clouds, which was the grown-up version of Majid Majidi's previously directed film, Children of Heaven (1997).

The movie was released in 2 phases; it was released overseas in 2017, premiering at the 2017 BFI London Film Festival, the 22nd Busan International Film Festival, the 14th Dubai International Film Festival, the 5th International Bosphorus Film Festival, the 29th Palm Springs International Film Festival, and the 48th International Film Festival of India (IFFI), while the Indian theatrical release took place on April 20, 2018.

The studio also produced Dhadak, Hindi-language remake of Sairat, which became a commercial hit, introducing two actors, Ishaan Khatter and Janhvi Kapoor. Then came Paltan, which received positive reviews from the families of the soldiers, but the audience and critics found the film's execution largely ineffective for a war film and an extremely long runtime.

Two successes for Zee Studios came in the middle of the year: one from Veere Di Wedding, which emerged as the fifth-highest-grossing Hindi film of the year and the highest for a film featuring female leads. The other was Raazi, which became the second commercially successful film with a female lead to join the ₹ 100 crore club in India. At the 64th Filmfare Awards, Raazi received 15 nominations and won 5 awards, including Best Film, Best Director (Meghna Gulzar), and Best Actress (Alia Bhatt).

Mulk, a legal drama released later that year, received positive reviews and won a Filmfare Award in the category of ‘Best Story’. Zee Studios also distributed Gold, a period sports film starring Akshay Kumar, with a budget of ₹ 61 crores, which ended up crossing the ₹ 100 crore mark at the box office.

Zee Studios produced a wide range of films in 2019 Manikarnika: The Queen of Jhansi performed well both nationally and internationally and became one of the highest-grossing women-centric films in India. Kangana Ranaut's portrayal of Rani Lakshmi Bai in the film garnered critical acclaim, winning her the National Film Award for Best Actress at the 67th National Film Awards. The film was selected for the Bucheon International Fantastic Film Festival and was screened at the Kashi Indian International Film Festival, Itanagar International Film Festival, and at the Indian Embassy in Lebanon under the Azadi Ka Amrit Mahotsav event.

The company also produced the romantic comedy-drama, Kala Shah Kala in Punjabi. It was well-received and rapidly rose to commercial success. It currently ranks as the 21st-highest-earning Punjabi movie. Kesari was another hit film produced and distributed internationally by the company.

Throughout the year, the studio produced films like Rampaat, Pailwaan (Hindi dubbed), and Nerkonda Paarvai, which performed commercially well. They also produced a film named, The Tashkent Files, a thriller about the death of former Indian Prime Minister Lal Bahadur Shastri.

Another well-received film was Anubhav Sinha's directorial, Article 15, which was the opening film for the 10th edition of the London Indian Film Festival and has won 3 Filmfare Awards- Best Film Critic (Anubhav Sinha), Best Actor Critic (Ayushmann Khurrana) and Best Story (Anubhav Sinha and Gaurav Solanki). At the end of the year, the studio came out with the lighthearted comedy-drama Good Newwz which became the 5th highest-grossing Bollywood film of 2019.

In 2020, Zee Studios released most of its films on OTT, due to the safety measures for the then-ongoing pandemic, COVID-19. It included movies like Hacked, Bhoot – Part One: The Haunted Ship, Suraj Pe Mangal Bhari, Khaali Peeli, and Solo Brathuke So Better.

=== 2021–present ===
2021 was the year when Zee Studios decided to deliberately invest in more regional cinema. The company distributed one Telugu political drama, Republic, and a Kannada-language crime thriller film Drishya 2, which was a remake of the 2021 Malayalam film Drishyam 2 and was regarded as one of the important movies in its line-up that attracted family audiences. The company also produced three Punjabi-language films, namely Qismat 2, Puaada, and Fuffad Ji, and all three were hit. Among the three films, Qismat 2 was a sleeper hit that became one of the 15 highest- grossing Punjabi films of all time. The year gave Zee Studios some good releases, including well-performing Thalaivii, a film based on the life of Indian actress-politician J. Jayalalithaa and Antim: The Final Truth and, Radhe, starring Salman Khan.

2022 was a very successful year for Zee Studios. The year began with The Kashmir Files, directed by Vivek Agnihotri, which became one of the most successful Hindi films of all time, and the 3rd highest-grossing Hindi film of 2022 amidst the COVID-19 pandemic in India, despite receiving mixed reviews. The film was also an official selection at the 53rd International Film Festival of India and was shortlisted for the prestigious Switzerland International Film Festival.

In 2022, the company collaborated with Annapurna Studios to produce the Telugu-language supernatural action drama Bangarraju, directed by Kalyan Krishna. It opened to mixed reviews, mostly positive, and was declared a success at the box office. The company also produced a Tamil language action thriller, Valimai, that crossed the 100-crore mark in the Indian market. The studio also produced and distributed Rashtra Kavach Om, which was in theatres and then subsequently released on ZEE5.

Raksha Bandhan, directed by Aanand L. Rai and starring Akshay Kumar and Bhumi Pednekar, received mixed reviews from critics but remained commercially unsuccessful. On the other hand, Rocket Gang, produced by Zee Studios, was a poor performer, critically and commercially. But Punjabi films like - Saunkan Saunkne, Main Viyah Nahi Karona Tere Naal, Ghund Kadh Le Ni Sohreyan Da Pind Aa Gaya, and Teri Meri Gal Ban Gayi.

In the same year, the company also distributed a horde of Bollywood movies like- Jhund, Janhit Mein Jaari, Goodbye, and Ram Setu. Zee Studios also distributed two Kannada films- Vikrant Rona and Head Bush and one Marathi film Bhaubali.

The studio wrapped the year with two thrillers - one released in cinemas and another on the OTT. The first was the survival thriller Mili, a remake of the 2019 Malayalam-language film Helen, co-produced by Boney Kapoor. The film received mixed reviews from critics, although garnering praises for Janhvi Kapoor's performance.

Zee Studios also produced a Telugu movie, Itlu Maredumilli Prajaneekam and a Kannada film titled Vedha.

Zee Studios started 2023 on a bright note with its new release Lost, starring Yami Gautam, opening at the Chicago South Asian Film Festival, Manoj Bajpayee starrer Hindi film Joram's official selection at the 52nd International Film Festival Rotterdam (IFFR).

Along with this, the company also gave multiple films early in the year which includes, H. Vinoth’s Tamil heist thriller Thunivu, starring Ajith Kumar, followed by Punjabi comedy-drama film, Mitran Da Naa Chalda, directed by Pankaj Batra starring Gippy Grewal, Tania, and Raj Shokar,[76] [77] and a Marathi-language dark comedy thriller, Vaalvi directed by Paresh Mokashi, which won the Best Feature Film at the Chicago South Asian Film Festival.

For 2023, Zee Studios plan to release a massive lineup of 28 titles across languages, featuring some of the best-known names in their respective industries.

In 2023, Zee Studios also produced Almost Pyaar with DJ Mohabbat, an Indian Hindi-language musical romantic drama film written and directed by Anurag Kashyap, starring Alaya F and newcomer Karan Mehta in the lead role. The film had its world premiere at the 2022 Marrakech Film Festival and its Asian premiere at the Hainan Island International Film Festival. Post-release, the film was praised by the audiences. Other Hindi-language highlights include Devashish Makhija’s Joram starring Manoj Bajpayee, Abhinay Deo's steaming series Brown starring Karishma Kapoor, Nawazuddin Siddiqui starrer Haddi, and Vivek Chauhan's multi-starrer, action homage Baap, starring Sunny Deol, Sanjay Dutt, Mithun Chakraborty and Jackie Shroff in the leading roles. and another Manoj Bajpayee starrer drama Bandaa.

Another 2023 hit, directed by Ashima Chibber, starring Rani Mukerji was Mrs. Chatterjee vs Norway, which has surpassed Shah Rukh Khan’s Pathaan overseas. The film is growing to be an international hit, warming up the box office numbers and taking international audiences by storm. Surpassing Pathaan and PS1, the movie is receiving unprecedented love and is recorded to be one of the highest collections for an Indian film in Norway. It is also one of the biggest Indian releases in the Baltic regions of Estonia, Latvia and Lithuania. The latest release by the studio was a Marathi-language film, Ghar Banduk Biryani, directed by Hemant Awtade and starring Nagraj Manjule in the lead role.

Zee Studios' Tamil-language slate includes Muthaiya's Kather Basha Endra Muthuramalingam, starring Arya; a landmark film and Kishor Pandurang Belekar’s dialogue-free film Gandhi Talks, with music by A. R. Rahman, with Vijay Sethupathi, Arvind Swamy and Aditi Rao Hydari.

Ashish Bende's Aatmapamphlet marked the 1st historical association for a Marathi film that brought together 3 stalwarts- Anand L Rai, Bhushan Kumar and Zee Studios. The film was selected in the Generation 14 plus competition at the prestigious Berlin International Film Festival.

Zee Studios is also producing Nayanthara's upcoming project, Nayanthara 75 (running title), with Nilesh Krishnan as the associate director and Thaman S as the music director for the film. Bro, starring Pawan Kalyan and Sai Dharam Tej, is under production is scheduled to release on July 28, 2023, and will mark the first collaboration of this director-actor duo.

Along with these, Zee Studios has several more upcoming regional language titles include Dulquer Salmaan's Malayalam language King of Kotha, Vikram Patwardhan's Frame, and Kannada-language film Ranganayaka starring Jaggesh, Telugu-language film Vimanam and Punjabi-language films like Pankaj Batra’s Uchiyan Ne Gallan Tere Yaar Diyan and Godday Godday Chaa, starring Gippy Grewal and Sonam Bajwa, respectively.

== Domestic distribution ==
Sairat, a 2016 Marathi romantic tragedy earned over 100 cores at the end of its theatrical run and is the highest-grossing Marathi film to date.

The studio has distributed the biggest blockbuster films of 2019 like Gully Boy, Badla, and Good Newwz.

During the challenging COVID-19 years, Zee Studios had theatrically released films like Suraj Pe Mangal Bhari, Antim, Khaali Peeli, and Ka Pae Ranasingam.

In 2022, the studio produced and distributed The Kashmir Files.

Zee Studios released commercial blockbusters such as Manikarnika, Kesari, Bangarraju, Valimai, Vedha, Saunkan Saunkne, Secret Superstar Naal and many more over the years.

The two largest releases for the studio in the recent past are done for the films Kisi Ka Bhai Kisi Ki Jaan and The Kashmir Files which were released across 2500 cinemas.

== Overseas distribution ==
The studio is the only Indian studio to have 5 releases in China – Secret Superstar, MOM Beyond The Clouds, Gold, and Hindi Medium.

Secret Superstar starring Aamir Khan is China's second highest-grossing film, collecting over 700 crores INR.

A colossal triumph for the studio was the release of Sridevi’s film, MOM which was produced by Boney Kapoor, Majid Majidi’s Beyond The Clouds starring Ishaan Khattar, and Gold starring Akshay Kumar, produced by Ritesh Sidhwani and Farhan Akhtar, all in 2019.

The studio has released one of Akshay Kumar's biggest hits into the international markets, Good Newwz, grossing over 12mn USD at the International Box Office.

The release of commercial hits such as Hindi Medium, Raazi, Veere Di Wedding, and Dream Girl, have cemented the studio's position as one of the dominant and top Indian film studios in the overseas market. The studios' recent release, Mrs. Chatterjee vs Norway, broke records in Norway becoming the highest opening weekend film collecting over 72K USD in a 3-day weekend.

== Film productions and distribution ==
Key
†	Denotes films that have not yet been released

Year	Title	Director	Language	Notes	Ref.
1993	Phir Teri Kahani Yaad Aayee	Mahesh Bhatt	Hindi	Produced under Zee TV	
1996	Fareb	Vikram Bhatt	Hindi	Produced under Zee Cinema	
2001	Gadar: Ek Prem Katha	Anil Sharma	Hindi	Produced under Zee Telefilms	
2001	Tere Liye	Sanjay Gadhvi	Hindi	Produced under Zee Telefilms	
2005	Silsiilay	Khalid Mohamed	Hindi	Distributed under Zee Motion Pictures	
2008	Takkar	Swapan Saha	Bengali	Produced under Zee Motion Pictures	
2008	Chirosathi	Haranath Chakraborty	Bengali	Produced under Zee Motion Pictures	
2008	Tomar Jonyo	Nilanjan Banerjee	Bengali	Produced under Zee Motion Pictures	
2008	Dhudgus	Rajesh Deshpande	Marathi	Produced under Zee Talkies	
2009	Gulaal	Anurag Kashyap	Hindi	Produced under Zee Limelight	
2009	Fox	Deepak Tijori	Hindi	Produced under Zee Motion Pictures	
2010	Aakrosh	Priyadarshan	Hindi	Distributed under Zee Motion Pictures	
2010	Jaggubhai	K. S. Ravikumar	Tamil	Produced under Zee Motion Pictures	
2010	Handa and Bhonda	Subhankar Chattopadhyay	Bengali	Produced under Zee Motion Pictures	
2010	Natarang	Ravi Jadhav	Marathi	Produced under Zee Talkies	
2013	Tendulkar Out	Swapnil Jaykar	Marathi	Produced under Zee Talkies	
2013	Fandry	Nagraj Manjule	Marathi	Produced under Zee Talkies	
2013	The Lunchbox	Ritesh Batra	Hindi	Produced under Essel Vision Productions	
2013	D-Day	Nikkhil Advani	Hindi	Produced under Essel Vision Productions	
2014	3 A.M.	Vishal Mahadkar	Hindi	Produced under Essel Vision Productions	
2014	Lai Bhaari	Nishikant Kamat	Marathi	Produced under Zee Talkies	
2014	Elizabeth Ekadashi	Paresh Mokashi	Marathi	Produced under Essel Vision Productions	
2014	Timepass	Ravi Jadhav	Marathi	Produced under Zee Talkies	
2014	Force	Raja Chanda	Bengali	Produced under Essel Vision Productions	
2015	Lokmanya: Ek Yugpurush	Om Raut	Marathi	Produced under Essel Vision Productions	
2015	Killa	Avinash Arun	Marathi	Produced under Essel Vision Productions	
2015	Jazbaa	Sanjay Gupta	Hindi	Produced by Zee Studios	
2016	Shankhachil	Goutam Ghose	Bengali	Distributed by Zee Studios	
2016	Sairat	Nagraj Manjule	Marathi	Produced by Zee Studios	
2016	Ventilator	Rajesh Mapuskar	Marathi	Produced by Zee Studios	
2016	Jaundya Na Balasaheb	Girish Kulkarni	Marathi	Produced by Zee Studios	
2016	Rustom	Tinu Suresh Desai	Hindi	Produced by Zee Studios	
2017	Ti Saddhya Kay Karte	Satish Rajwade	Marathi	Produced by Zee Studios	
2017	Manasu Mallige	S. Narayan	Kannada	Produced by Zee Studios	
2017	Chi Va Chi Sau Ka	Paresh Mokashi	Marathi	Produced by Zee Studios	
2017	Faster Fene	Aditya Sarpotdar	Marathi	Produced by Zee Studios	
2017	Mom	Ravi Udyawar	Hindi	Produced under Zee Studios	
2017	Secret Superstar	Advait Chandan	Hindi	Produced by Zee Studios	
2017	Qarib Qarib Singlle	Tanuja Chandra	Hindi	Produced under Zee Studios	
2017	Romans	Ludwig Shammasian, Paul Shammasian	English	Produced Overseas by Zee Studios	
2017	Raees	Rahul Dholakia	Hindi	Distributed Overseas by Zee Studios	
2017	Half Girlfriend	Mohit Suri	Hindi	Distributed Overseas by Zee Studios	
2017	Bareilly Ki Barfi	Ashwiny Iyer Tiwari	Hindi	Distributed Overseas by Zee Studios	
2017	Fukrey Returns	Mrighdeep Singh Lamba	Hindi	Distributed Overseas by Zee Studios	
2017	Hindi Medium	Saket Chaudhary	Hindi	Distributed Overseas by Zee Studios	
2018	Gulabjaam	Sachin Kundalkar	Marathi	Produced by Zee Studios	
2018	Beyond the Clouds	Majid Majidi	Hindi	Produced by Zee Studios	
2018	Parmanu: The Story of Pokhran	Abhishek Sharma	Hindi	Produced by Zee Studios	
2018	Dhadak	Shashank Khaitan	Hindi	Produced under Zee Studios	
2018	Paltan	J.P. Dutta	Hindi	Produced under Zee Studios	
2018	Love Sonia	Tabrez Noorani	Hindi	Distributed by Zee Studios	
2018	Raazi	Meghna Gulzar	Hindi	Distributed Overseas by Zee Studios	
2018	Veere Di Wedding	Shashanka Ghosh	Hindi	Distributed Overseas by Zee Studios	
2018	Mulk	Anubhav Sinha	Hindi	Distributed Overseas by Zee Studios	
2018	Gold	Reema Kagti	Hindi	Distributed Overseas by Zee Studios	
2019	Manikarnika: The Queen of Jhansi	Kangana Ranaut, Radha Krishna Jagarlamudi	Hindi	Produced by Zee Studios	
2019	Kala Shah Kala	Amarjit Singh	Punjabi	Produced by Zee Studios	
2019	Kesari	Anurag Singh	Hindi	Produced by Zee Studios	
2019	The Tashkent Files	Vivek Agnihotri	Hindi	Produced by Zee Studios	
2019	Rampaat	Ravi Jadhav	Marathi	Produced by Zee Studios	
2019	Article 15	Anubhav Sinha	Hindi	Produced by Zee Studios	
2019	Pailwaan	S. Krishna	Kannada	Hindi dubbed version; Distributed by Zee Studios	
2019	Good Newwz	Raj Mehta	Hindi	Produced by Zee Studios	
2019	Kumbalangi Nights	Madhu C Narayanan	Malayalam	Distributed Overseas by Zee Studios	
2019	Oru Adaar Love	Omar Lulu	Malayalam	Distributed Overseas by Zee Studios	
2019	Madhura Raja	Vysakh	Malayalam	Distributed Overseas by Zee Studios	
2019	Blank	Behzad Khambata	Hindi	Distributed Overseas by Zee Studios	
2019	Judgementall Hai Kya	Prakash Kovelamudi	Hindi	Distributed Overseas by Zee Studios	
2019	Nerkonda Paarvai	H. Vinoth	Tamil	Produced under Zee Studios	
2019	Jabariya Jodi	Prashant Singh	Hindi	Distributed Overseas by Zee Studios	
2019	Dream Girl	Raaj Shaandilyaa	Hindi	Distributed Overseas by Zee Studios	
2019	Gully Boy	Zoya Akhtar	Hindi	Distributed Overseas by Zee Studios	
2020	Hacked	Vikram Bhatt	Hindi	Produced by Zee Studios	
2020	Bhoot – Part One: The Haunted Ship	Bhanu Pratap Singh	Hindi	Produced by Zee Studios	
2020	Suraj Pe Mangal Bhari	Abhishek Sharma	Hindi	Produced by Zee Studios	
2020	Gunjan Saxena: The Kargil Girl	Sharan Sharma	Hindi	Produced under Zee Studios	
2020	Khaali Peeli	Maqbool khan	Hindi	Produced under Zee Studios	
2020	Solo Brathuke So Better	Subbu	Telugu	Produced by Zee Studios	
2021	Vakeel Saab	Venu Sriram	Telugu	Distributed by Zee Studios	
2021	Sridevi Soda Center	Karuna Kumar	Telugu	Distributed by Zee Studios	
2021	Republic	Deva Katta	Telugu	Produced by Zee Studios	
2021	Qismat 2	Jagdeep Sidhu	Punjabi	Produced by Zee Studios	
2021	Radhe	Prabhu Deva	Hindi	Produced and overseas theatrical release by Zee Studios	
2021	Puaada	Rupinder Chahal	Punjabi	Produced by Zee Studios	
2021	Thalaivii	A. L. Vijay	Tamil; Hindi	Produced by Zee Studios	
2021	Sanak	Kanishk Varma	Hindi	Produced under Zee Studios	
2021	Antim: The Final Truth	Mahesh Manjrekar	Hindi	Produced by Zee Studios	
2021	Fuffad Ji	Pankaj Batra	Punjabi	Produced under Zee Studios	
2021	Drishya 2	P. Vasu	Kannada	Produced by Zee Studios	
2022	Bangarraju	Kalyan Krishna	Telugu	Produced by Zee Studios	
2022	Aaraattu	B. Unnikrishnan	Malayalam	Distribution under Zee Studios	
2022	Valimai	H. Vinoth	Tamil	Co-produced with Bayview Projects LLP; co-distributed by Romeo Pictures, Gopuram Cinemas	
2022	Main Viyah Nahi Karona Tere Naal	Rupinder Inderjit	Punjabi	Produced by Zee Studios	
2022	Jhund	Nagraj Manjule	Hindi	Distributed by Zee Studios	
2022	The Kashmir Files	Vivek Agnihotri	Hindi	Produced by Zee Studios	
2022	Saunkan Saunkne	Amarjit Singh Saron	Punjabi	Distributed by Zee Studios	
2022	Dharmaveer	Pravin Tarde	Marathi	Distributed by Zee Studios	
2022	Dhaakad	Razneesh Razy Ghai	Hindi	Distributed by Zee Studios	
2022	Nenjuku Needhi	Arunraja Kamaraj	Tamil	Produced under Zee Studios	
2022	Janhit Mein Jaari	Jai Basantu Singh	Hindi	Distributed by Zee Studios	
2022	Veetla Vishesham	RJ Balaji, NJ Saravanan	Tamil	Produced & Distributed by Zee Studios	
2022	Rashtra Kavach Om	Kapil Verma	Hindi	Produced and Distribution under Zee Studios	
2022	Ghund Kadh Le Ni Sohreyan Da Pind Aa Gaya	Ksshitij Chaudhary	Punjabi	Distributed by Zee Studios	
2022	Vikrant Rona	Anup Bhandari	Kannada	Distributed by Zee Studios	
2022	Timepass 3	Ravi Jadhav	Marathi	Produced by Zee Studios	
2022	Raksha Bandhan	Aanand L Rai	Hindi	Produced by Zee Studios	
2022	Dobaaraa	Anurag Kashyap	Hindi	Overseas Distribution by Zee Studios	
2022	Kalapuram	Karuna Kumar	Telugu	Produced by Zee Studios	
2022	Teri Meri Gal Ban Gayi	Preeti Sapru	Punjabi	Distributed by Zee Studios	
2022	Bhaubali	Sameer Patil	Marathi	Distributed by Zee Studios	
2022	Middle Class Love	Ratna Sinha	Hindi	Produced and Distribution by Zee Studios	
2022	Goodbye	Vikas Bahl	Hindi	Distributed Overseas by Zee Studios	
2022	Head Bush	Shoonya	Kannada	Distributed by Zee Studios	
2022	Ram Setu	Abhishek Sharma	Hindi	Distributed and Produced by Zee Studios	
2022	Har Har Mahadev	Abhijeet Shirish Deshpande	Marathi	Produced by Zee Studios	
2022	Mili	Mathukutty Xavier	Hindi	Produced and Distribution under Zee Studios	
2022	Rocket Gang	Bosco Martis	Hindi	Produced by Zee Studios	
2022	Itlu Maredumilli Prajaneekam	AR Mohan	Telugu	Produced by Zee Studios	
2022	Blurr	Ajay Bahl	Hindi	Produced by Zee Studios	
2022	Vedha	A. Harsha	Kannada	Produced by Zee Studios	
2023	Thunivu	H. Vinoth	Tamil	Produced under Zee Studios	
2023	Vaalvi	Paresh Mokashi	Marathi	Produced by Zee Studios	
2023	Almost Pyaar with DJ Mohabbat	Anurag Kashyap	Hindi	Produced by Zee Studios	
2023	Lost	Aniruddha Roy Chowdhury	Hindi	Produced by Zee Studios	
2023	Gol Gappe	Smeep Kang	Punjabi	Produced by Zee Studios	
2023	Mitran Da Naa Chalda	Pankaj Batra	Punjabi	Produced by Zee Studios	
2023	Mrs. Chatterjee vs Norway	Ashima Chibber	Hindi	Produced and Distribution under Zee Studios	
2023	Ghar Banduk Biryani	Hemant Jangal Awtade	Marathi	Produced under Zee Studios	
2023	Kisi Ka Bhai Kisi Ki Jaan	Farhad Samji	Hindi	Produced by Zee Studios	
2023	Godday Godday Chaa	Vijay Kumar Arora	Punjabi	Produced by Zee Studios	
2023	Kathar Basha Endra Muthuramalingam	M. Muthaiah	Tamil	Produced by Zee Studios	
2023	Vimanam	Siva Prasad Yanala	Telugu	Produced under Zee Studios	
2023	Bro	Samuthirakani	Telugu	Produced under Zee Studios	
2023	Gadar 2	Anil Sharma	Hindi	Produced by Zee Studios	
2023	King of Kotha	Abhilash Joshiy	Malayalam	Produced under Zee Studios	
2023	Skanda	Boyapati Sreenu	Telugu	Produced under Zee Studios	
2023	12th Fail	Vidhu Vinod Chopra	Hindi	Produced under Zee Studios	
2023	Annapoorani	Nilesh Krishnaa	Tamil	Produced under Zee Studios	
2023	Joram	Devashish Makhija	Hindi	Distributed by Zee Studios	
2024	Swatantrya Veer Savarkar	Randeep Hooda	Hindi	Distributed by Zee Studios	
2024	Maidaan	Amit Sharma	Hindi	Distributed by Zee Studios	
2024	Silence 2: The Night Owl Bar Shootout	Aban Bharucha Deohans	Hindi	Produced by Zee Studios	
2024	Rautu Ka Raaz	Anand Surapur	Hindi	Produced by Zee Studios	
2024	Rathnam	Hari	Tamil	Produced under Zee Studios	
2024	Vedaa	Nikkhil Advani	Hindi	Produced under Zee Studios	
2024	Mr. & Mrs. Mahi	Sharan Sharma	Hindi	Produced under Zee Studios	
2024	Berlin	Atul Sabharwal	Hindi	ZEE5 release	
2024	The Greatest of All Time	Venkat Prabhu	Tamil	Distributed by Zee studios	
2024	The Sabarmati Report	Dheeraj Sarna	Hindi	Distributed by Zee Studios	
2024	UI	Upendra	Kannada	Distributed by Zee Studios	
2024	Vanvaas	Anil Sharma	Hindi	Produced By Zee Studios	
2025	Fateh	Sonu Sood	Hindi	Distributed by Zee Studios	
2025	Game Changer	S. Shankar	Telugu	Distributed by Zee Studios	
2025	Emergency	Kangana Ranaut	Hindi	Distributed by Zee Studios	
2025	Deva	Rosshan Andrrews	Hindi	Distributed by Zee Studios	
2025	Loveyapa	Advait Chandan	Hindi	Distributed by Zee Studios	
2025	Kingston	Kamal Prakash	Tamil	Produced by Zee Studios	
2025	Kapkapiii	Sangeeth Sivan	Hindi	Distributed by Zee Studios	
2025	Phule	Anant Mahadevan	Hindi	Distributed by Zee Studios	
2025	Kaalidhar Laapata	Madhumita	Hindi	Distributed by Zee Studios	
2025	Aankhon Ki Gustaakhiyan	Santosh Singh	Hindi	Distributed by Zee Studios	
2025	Dhadak 2	Shazia Iqbal	Hindi	Produced and Distributed by Zee Studios	
2025	Beauty	J S S Vardhan	Telugu	Produced and Distributed by Zee Studios	
2025	Champion	Pradeep Advaitham	Telugu	Produced by Zee Studios	
2026	Azad Bharath	Roopa Iyer	Hindi	Produced and Distributed by Zee Studios	
2026	Rahu Ketu	Vipul Vig	Hindi	Produced and Distributed by Zee Studios	
2026	Safia/Safdar	Baba Azmi	Hindi	Produced by Zee Studios and ZEE5 release	
2026	Gandhi Talks	Kishor Pandurang Belekar	Sound	Produced and Distributed by Zee Studios	
2026	Bhabiji Ghar Par Hain! Fun on the Run	Shashank Bali	Hindi	Produced and Distributed by Zee Studios	
2026	Do Deewane Seher Mein	Ravi Udyawar	Hindi	Produced by Zee Studios	
2026	Kennedy	Anurag Kashyap	Hindi	Produced by Zee Studios and ZEE5 release	
2026	Raakaasa	Manasa Sharma	Telugu	Produced and Distributed by Zee Studios	
2026	Bad Boy Karthik	Ramesh Desina	Telugu	Distributed by Zee Studios	
2026	Ginny Wedss Sunny 2	Prasshant Jha	Hindi	Produced and Distributed by Zee Studios	
2026	Pati Patni Aur Woh Do	Mudassar Aziz	Hindi	Distributed by Zee Studios	
2026	The Great Grand Superhero	Manish Saini	Hindi	Produced and Distributed by Zee Studios	
2026	Bandar	Anurag Kashyap	Hindi	Distributed by Zee Studios	
2026	Nagabandham: The Secret Treasure	Abhishek Nama	Telugu	Distributed by Zee Studios	
2026	Frame	Vikram Patwardhan	Marathi	Produced by Zee Studios and ZEE5 release	
2026	Jana Nayagan	H. Vinoth	Tamil	Distributed by Zee Studios	
2026	The India Story	Chettan DK	Hindi	Produced and Distributed by Zee Studios	
2026	Bhootam Bhayyam	Ramchandra Gaonkar	Marathi	Produced and Distributed by Zee Studios	
2026	Tom & Cherry	Dharmessh Mehta	Gujarati	Produced and Distributed by Zee Studios	
2026	Hi	Vishnu Edavan	Tamil	Produced and Distributed Overseas by Zee Studios	
2026	Baththa	Balaji Tharaneetharan	Tamil	Distributed Overseas by Zee Studios	
2026	Drishyam: The Conclusion	Abhishek Pathak	Hindi	Distributed Overseas by Zee Studios	
2026	Blind Game	Sangeeth Sivan	Hindi	Produced by Zee Studios and ZEE5 release	
2026	Sathyavan Savithiri	Praveen S. Vijaay	Tamil	Produced and Distributed by Zee Studios	
2026	Jijai	Trushant Ingle	Marathi	Produced and Distributed by Zee Studios	
2026	Delhi 2021	Abhishek Acharya	Hindi	Produced by Zee Studios and ZEE5 release	
2026	King of Salangpur †	Prashant Deshaval	Gujarati	Produced and Distributed by Zee Studios	
2026	Maatrubhumi: May War Rest in Peace †	Apoorva Lakhia	Hindi	Distributed Overseas by Zee Studios	
2027	Phulwara †	Ravi Jadhav	Marathi	Produced and Distributed by Zee Studios	
2027	Silaa †	Omung Kumar	Hindi	Produced and Distributed by Zee Studios	
