= Godday Godday Chaa =

2023 Indian film by Vijay Kumar Arora

- Theatrical release poster
- Directed by: Vijay Kumar Arora
- Written by: Jagdeep Sidhu
- Starring: Sonam Bajwa; Tania; Gitaj Bindrakhia; Gurjazz
- Music by: Sandeep Saxena
- Production companies: Zee Studios & VH Entertainment
- Distributed by: Zee Studios
- Release date: 26 May 2023
- Running time: 129 minutes
- Country: India
- Language: Punjabi

Godday Godday Chaa (pronounced [ɡoːɖeː ɡoːɖeː t͡ʃaːˈə]) is a Punjabi family comedy-drama film set in the 80s and 90s, produced under the label of Zee Studios and VH Entertainment, written by Jagdeep Sidhu, and directed by Vijay Kumar Arora. It stars Sonam Bajwa, Tania, Gitaj Bindrakhia, and Gurjazz. The film was released on 26 May 2023.

The film won Best Punjabi Feature film award at 71st National Film Awards.

== Plot ==
During the early 80s and 90s, it was only a dream for the women of Punjab to attend a wedding. The movie revolves around Rani (played by Sonam Bajwa), the protagonist of the film, who has made it her mission to take the women of her ‘pind’ (transl. village) to a baraat (transl. wedding procession). To fulfil her mission, she teams up with other females in the village and takes some really bold steps. Will she win and make it possible for the women to attend baraat?

== Cast ==
- Sonam Bajwa as Rani
- Tania as Harsimran Kaur "Nikko"
- Gitaz Bindrakhia as Bagga
- Gurjazz as Parminder Singh "Pinta"
- Nirmal Rishi
- Sardar Sohi
- Gurpreet Bhangu
- Rupinder Rupi
- Mintu Kapa
- Amrit Amby

== Music ==
The movie's soundtrack, released under the Tips Punjabi label, features three high-energy wedding songs. The first song, Sakhiye Saheliye, depicts female friendship, while the second song, Allahran De, showcases female dancing. The third song, Nazaare, showcases bhangra moves by the male cast. The fourth song, Kudiyan Di Marzi, is emotional and reflects women's opinions. The final song, Chann Nu, is yet to be released.

=== Track list of Godday Godday Chaa ===
No.	Title	Lyrics	Music	Singer(s)	Length
1.	"Sakhiye Saheliye"	Harinder Kour	Rakesh Rekx	Jasmeen Akhtar	2:47
2.	"Allahran De"	Kaptaan	N Vee	Nachhatar Gill	3:31
3.	"Nazaare"	Kaptaan	N Vee	Kulwinder Billa	2:45
4.	"Kudiyan Di Marzi"	Harmanjeet Singh	Gurmeet Singh	Simran Bhardwaj	3:12
5.	"Chann Nu"	Harinder Kour	Gurmeet Singh	Simran Bhardwaj	0:00
Total length:					13:15

== Production ==
The movie's shoot began on 18 November 2022, in Ganganagar, Rajasthan. Sonam Bajwa announced the shoot on Instagram, and the release date was announced on 24 April 2023. This is the second time that Sonam Bajwa and Tania have shared the screen after Guddiyan Patole.

== Release ==
The film was released worldwide on 26 May 2023, with audiences from India, the United States, Canada, Australia, and New Zealand.
