= Lekh (film) =

Punjabi movie

- Theatrical release poster
- Directed by: Manvir Brar
- Written by: Jagdeep Sidhu
- Produced by: Gunbir Singh Sidhu; Manmord Sidhu
- Starring: Gurnam Bhullar Tania
- Cinematography: Ravi Kumar Sena
- Music by: B Praak
- Production company: White Hill Studios
- Release date: 1 April 2022
- Running time: 121 minutes
- Country: India
- Language: Punjabi

Lekh is an Indian Punjabi language romantic film starring Gurnam Bhullar and Tania in lead roles. The film is produced by White Hill Studios and is directed by Manvir Brar. It is written by Qismat fame writer-director, Jagdeep Sidhu. The film was released on 1 April 2022. The trailer of the film was released on 16 March 2022.

== Synopsis ==
As teenagers, Rajvir (Gurnaam Bhullar) and Ronak (Tania) find themselves infatuated with each other but they did not express their feelings. They belong to different families and the circumstances lead them apart. Ronak's life picks up some pace whereas Rajvir is still stuck in his past. Ronak is married now and has a son who is named after her crush which shows that Ronak still has Rajvir in her mind. Years later, when Ronak and Rajvir meet again, they regret the way they drifted away and believe that they are meant to be together. They decide to live together but soon realize that the choices (or plans) made by the supreme god for them are greater and better than the ones they could have ever made for themselves

== Plot ==
In Present, Ronak arrives at a Marriage in India from Canada. She and her friends remember a boy called Rajveer (Gurnam Bhullar) who was in love with Ronak when they were in Class 11 at Maharaja Ranjeet Singh School and Ronak's friend invites him to come to her marriage. Film goes back to Ronak's School days in 2010 when Rajveer is asking his dad to buy a Bicycle for him to which his father (Kaka Kautki) agrees. Rajveer starts going to school on his bicycle but soon falls in love with Ronak (Tania) who is his classmate at school. Rajveer intentionally punctures his cycle everyday to travel on Van to sit with Ronak and soon both fall in love with each other. They make a plan to go to watch Mel Karade Rabba, a Punjabi movie. But on the day, Rajveer is absent from school. He never comes back to school. Ronak discovers that Rajveer and his Father left the village for another place. In Present, Ronak discovers that Rajveer left the wedding ceremony after learning that she was there. Ronak arrives at her home and discovers that all of his plants are dead to which she is very disappointed. Her family calls a Florist to re-decorate the garden. To Ronak's surprise, that florist is Rajveer. Ronak goes to Rajveer's home to meet him where she asks him why did he not come to school after promising to go to watch the movie. Rajveer tells that his father died on that day and his maternal family took him to Rajasthan. Rajveer also tells that he came to school on 14 February 2012 where he saw Ronak receiving flowers from another boy. Ronak tells him that boy was her friend's Saabi's boyfriend not her. After learning about this misunderstanding both Rajveer and Ronak cry. Ronak spends few days at Rajveer's home and leaves. She calls her husband (Ammy Virk) from Canada and tells him the situation. Her husband allows to live with Rajveer and file for divorce with him. Ronak returns to Rajveer and tells him about conversation with his husband but tells Rajveer that she that it was injustice to divorce his husband after realizing how much he loved her. Then, Ronak asks Rajveer to move on because if she can find a person who loves her so much, he can also find a girl who loves her so much. Ronak returns to Canada and Rajveer starts living a normal and positive life. The movie ends on a positive note.

== Cast ==
- Gurnam Bhullar as Rajveer
- Tania as Raunak
- Kaka Kautki as Rajveer's father
- Harman Dhaliwal as Saabi
- Harman Brar as Kamal
- Nirmal Rishi as Ronak's maternal grandmother (Special Appearance)
- Mandeep Singh as Rajveer's classmate
- Ammy Virk as Maninder: Ronak's husband (Special appearance)

== Production ==
The principal photography of the film started in March 2021 and wrapped its first schedule in April, 2021. The teaser of the film was released on 26 February 2022. The music director of the film is B Praak whereas Jaani has written and composed the lyrics. The film is a tribute to the 2010 film Mel Karade Rabba

== Soundtrack ==
Lekh

Soundtrack album by B Praak
- Released: 2022
- Genre: Feature film soundtrack
- Length: 20:19
- Language: Punjabi
- Label: White Hill Music

B Praak chronology
Qismat 2 (2021)	Lekh (2022)	Moh (2022)

The film's songs are written and composed by Jaani and music is given by B Praak.

First song from film "Udd Gya" was released on 13 March 2022, sung by B Praak on lyrics and composition by Jaani. The second song from film "Bewafai Kar Gya" was released on 20 March 2022, composed and sung by B Praak. The third song from film "Mera Yaar" was released on 25 March, sung by Gurnam Bhullar and lyrics and composition by Jaani. The fourth song from film "Beliya" was released on 29 March 2022, sung by Gurnam Bhullar and lyrics and composition by Jaani. The fifth song from film "Zaroori Nai" released on 2 April 2022, sung by Afsana Khan, lyrics by Jaani, and composition by B Praak.

=== Track list of Lekh ===
No.	Title	Lyrics	Singer(s)	Length
1.	"Udd Gaya"	Jaani	B Praak	4:10
2.	"Bewafai Kar Gaya"	Jaani	B Praak	4:02
3.	"Mera Yaar"	Jaani	Gurnam Bhullar	4:17
4.	"Beliya"	Jaani	Gurnam Bhullar	3:46
5.	"Zaroori Nai"	Jaani	Afsana Khan	4:24
Total length:				20:19
