= Bajre da sitta (song) =

Punjabi folk song

Bajre da sitta is a Punjabi folksong, originally performed by the two sisters Surinder Kaur and Prakash Kaur, at a time when it was a local taboo for women to raise their voice. The song was further popularised following the production of the 2022 film of the same name.
