= Oye Makhna =

2022 Indian Punjabi-language film

- Theatrical release poster
- Directed by: Simerjit Singh
- Written by: Rakesh Dhawan
- Produced by: Ammy Virk; Vikram Mehra; Siddharth Kumar Anand; Simerjit Singh
- Starring: Ammy Virk; Guggu Gill; Sidhika Sharma; Tania
- Cinematography: Sandeep Patil
- Edited by: Amarjit Singh; Anurodh Gusain
- Music by: Inder Bawra; Sunny Bawra
- Production companies: Saregama; Ammy Virk Productions; Simerjit Productions; Yoodlee Films
- Distributed by: White Hill Studios
- Release date: 4 November 2022
- Running time: 129 minutes
- Country: India
- Language: Punjabi

Oye Makhna (transl. My Sweetheart) is a Punjabi romantic–comedy film made under the Saregama Label. The film was directed by Simerjit Singh, and it stars Ammy Virk, Tania, Guggu Gill and Sidhika Sharma. The film was released on 4 November 2022.

== Plot ==
When Makhan falls in love with a girl by just looking at her eyes, he and his uncle go to hilarious lengths to set him up with her. However, things take a chaotic turn when they find out that they've actually fixed his wedding with the wrong girl. As the pressure to clear out the confusion mounts, the very integrity of their family is threatened. Will Makhan find a way to be with the girl of his dreams? The uncle ends up with an ethical dilemma.

== Cast ==
- Ammy Virk as Makhan Virk
- Tania as Rimple
- Guggu Gill as Shinda
- Sidhika Sharma as Guddi
- Hardeep Gill
- Tarsem Paul
- Satwant Kaur
- Sukhwinder Chahal as Harnek Singh
- Deedar Gill
- Parminder Gill
- Manju Mahal
- Rose J. Kaur
- Sapna Choudhary as Dancer in song "Chad Gayi Chad Gayi"

== Release ==
The film was originally set to release on 9 September 2022, but got pushed to 4 November 2022 with a schedule of worldwide release.

== Music ==
The music of the film is composed by Avvy Sra, Gaurav Dev, Kartik Dev and duo of Salim–Sulaiman. The background score is composed by the duo of Inder Bawra and Sunny Bawra.

Songs	Composer	Music	Lyrics	Singer
Chad Gayi Chad Gayi	Happy Raikoti	Avvy Sra	Happy Raikoti	Neha Kakkar
Chann Sitare	Harmanjeet Singh	Avvy Sra	HarmanJeet Singh	Ammy Virk
Chum Chum Rakheya	Gaurav Dev, Kartik Dev	Gaurav Dev, Kartik Dev	Kirat Gill	B Praak
Main Cheez Ki Haan	Happy Raikoti	Avvy Sra	Happy Raikoti	Ammy Virk
Lakh Lakh Vadhaiyan	Salim–Sulaiman	Salim–Sulaiman	Shradha Pandit	Afsana Khan, Saajz
