= Bajre Da Sitta =

- Directed by: Jass Grewal
- Produced by: Kiran Yadav
- Starring: Tania; Noor Chahal; Guggu Gill; Ammy Virk
- Production company: Ammy Virk Productions Film
- Release date: 15 July 2022
- Country: India
- Language: Punjabi

Bajre Da Sitta is a 2022 Punjabi period drama directed by Jass Grewal, and produced by Ammy Virk. Along with Virk, the film stars Tania and Noor Chahal in leading roles. Other main actors include Guggu Gill, B N Sharma, and Nirmal Rishi. The drama takes its title from the song of the same name, and was inspired by the sisters Surinder Kaur and Prakash Kaur, who first sang it. The film was released in India on 15 July 2022.

Set in the early 1960s, the plot follows the aspirations of two young women, Roop and Basant, who wish to sing, but are restrained by a patriarchal mindset. Following an offer from a records company, Roop's father is persuaded to allow them to at first sign up for one single and later an album, on the condition that their identies are not disclosed. Both are a huge success and when a second edition of the album is released with their names and photographs on the cover, the men in the family become irate at the resulting public attention. Roop is hastily married to Ratan, who makes use of his own male power in disallowing Roop a voice, until he sees the magic in it.

The film was generally received favourably. On its release The Times of India noted that the film portrayed general Punjabi male opinions of the time, particularly the stereotypical strict father. It described the plot as beautifully constructed, although to some extent the ending is easy to predict. The film re-popularised the song Bajre da sitta.

== Plot ==
Two cousins, Roop and Basant, live with their parents and grandmother in a small village in Punjab in the early 1960s. Both have gifted voices and are one day spotted by Baghel Singh, a representative for the record company HMG. He headhunts them and approaches their fathers with an offer to record a single. To the family, it was not respectful in the public eye for young women to entertain outside the family home and the result was that both their fathers strongly objected. The expectation of Roop was that she would marry the man her father chose for her and maintain a household. To their grandmother, their skills in crochet, embroidery, and stitching far outweighed their singing talent.

Roop's father is persuaded to allow the two girls to sign up for one song, with the conditions being that the girls names do not appear on the record, they do not leave the village, and their images are not revealed. Their first song is a success, to the extent that the villagers on the whole praise it, while unaware who sang it. Baghel Singh later reports back to the company that Mohammed Rafi heard them and dubbed them Punjab's very own nightingales. Until that single, the girls had sung around the house; whilst cooking, cleaning, and performing other household chores. During a drinks evening with friends, Roop's father promises her hand in marriage to a man who lives far away.

Following the success of their debut song, company representatives visit Roop's home to offer the making of an album, but anger her father when the girls are given a box full of cash; felt at the time akin to accepting money in return for one's self respect. At the suggestion of Basant, Roop's father grants permission to sing one more time, on the acceptance from Roop that she will marry the man he has given his word to. The result is an album of five songs including the song Bajre da sitta. (Note: Bajre Da Sitta is a well known Punjabi folksong that conveys the crushing of a woman's feelings, like a pearl millet cob is crushed in her hand.) On the cover however, states the girls names, Roop Kaur and Basant Kaur, inciting not only fame from afar, but infuriation at home and a steer away attitude from their friend's families.

Roop's father breaks the wedding proposal after he discovers the boy wants to sing too. Balbir kaur, a reporter from a magazine, visits the home, interviews the girls and takes photographs, after which their images appear in the press and on the cover of a new edition of the album. Public attention towards the girls and their family causes Roop's father to accept an arranged marriage to Ratan, who tells him he won't allow her to sing either. After the wedding, Roop is told by Ratan that if she must sing then to sing inside closed doors, but when he finds her voice reaches outside the walls of the house, he tears her album cover. After finding her singing again, he grabs her arm in anger. A flashback scene shows Ratan's grandfather telling him as a child that those of good repute do not sing. Next door lives a four-year old girl, Paali. She has an unknown illness that has left her in a long-term semi-paralytic state. It is intimated that her care would have likely been better had she be born male. Rejected by her father, her mother holds hope. One evening, Paali's condition deteriorates and her mother rushes her to Ratan's house. Paali is left with Roop while the others run to fetch the doctor. They return to find Roop's voice has miraculously cured the girl. Ratan subsequently takes Roop to her father's home and tells the family that whatever their views, he gives his permission for Roop to sing.

== Cast ==
- Tania as Roop Kaur
- Noor Chahal as Basant Kaur
- Guggu Gill as Sher Singh
- Nirmal Rishi as Roop's grandmother
- Parkash Gandhu as Mewa
- B N Sharma as Baghel Singh
- Ammy Virk as Ratan
- Akansha Sareen as Paali's mother

== Music ==
The music of the film is composed by Avvy Sra, Jaidev Kumar and interpreted by Jyotica Tangri and Noor Chahal.

| Songs | Music | Singer |
|---|---|---|
| Baajre Da Sitta (Title Track) | Avvy Sra, Jaidev Kumar | Jyotica Tangri, Noor Chahal |
| Sari Raat Tera Takiya Mein Rah | Avvy Sra, Jaidev Kumar | Jyotica Tangri, Noor Chahal |
| Surmedani | Avvy Sra, Jaidev Kumar | Jyotica Tangri, Noor Chahal |
| Sony Da Chubara | Avvy Sra, Jaidev Kumar | Jyotica Tangri, Noor Chahal |
| Chan Kithan Guzari Aey Raat | Avvy Sra, Jaidev Kumar | Jyotica Tangri, Noor Chahal |

== Production ==
The film was directed by Jass Grewal, and produced by Virk. Production took place in the vicinity of Chandigarh. The film was released in India on 15 July 2022.

== Reception ==
According to Brit Asia TV the film gained unexpected attention at the release of its trailer when it exceeded general expectations. On its release The Times of India noted that the film portrayed general Punjabi male opinions of the time with Guggu Gill playing the role of a stereotypical strict father. His mood could be deciphered from his expressions. It concluded that the plot is beautifully constructed, although to some extent it is easy to predict how the story ends. The climax it felt stimulated careful consideration. The newspaper gave the film 4 stars out of 5 in a very positive review. Another article published by the same newspaper presented Bajre Da Sitta as "a sensitive film about a woman's ambitions". The same newspaper considered the film to reflect recent changes in Punjabi cinema. The Tribune published that "the film beautifully highlights the struggles of women who have to fight for their voices to be heard". Jaidev Kumar, Avvy Sra, and Ustad Hansraj Behl were commended for the music.

The film re-popularised the song Bajre da sitta. One year after the release, Tania posted a message on her Twitter account to share the appreciation expressed by the audience.

== Screenings ==
The film was screened at the 2023 South Asian Film Festival of Montreal and at the Winnipeg Punjabi Festival.
