= Qismat =

2018 film directed by Jagdeep Sidhu

- Theatrical release poster
- Directed by: Jagdeep Sidhu
- Written by: Jagdeep Sidhu
- Based on: Rishi - Tanisha
- Produced by: Ankit Vijan; Navdeep Narula; Jatinder Aulukh; Shubham Goyal
- Starring: Ammy Virk; Sargun Mehta; Guggu Gill; Satwant Kaur; Tania; Hardeep Gill; Harby Sangha
- Cinematography: Jalesh Oberoi
- Edited by: Manish More
- Music by: B Praak; Sukh E
- Production company: Shri Narotam Ji Production
- Distributed by: White Hill Studios
- Release date: 21 September 2018 (India)
- Running time: 137 minutes
- Country: India
- Language: Punjabi
- Box office: est. ₹28 crore

Qismat (transl. Destiny) is a 2018 Punjabi romantic drama film written and directed by Jagdeep Sidhu. Produced by Shri Narotam Ji Productions, the film stars Ammy Virk and Sargun Mehta in lead roles along with Guggu Gill, Tania and Harby Sangha in supporting roles. It was titled after a 2017 song of the same name, sung by Virk and starring Mehta in its music video. The film follows a man who falls in love whilst studying in Chandigarh, despite his marriage being arranged to another woman. It marked feature film debut for Tania.

Principal photography took place within a single schedule that lasted 45 days in Chandigarh and other villages of Punjab, India, with Jalesh Oberoi serving as cinematographer. The background score was composed by Gurmeet Singh and Sandeep Saxena while the soundtrack was composed by B Praak and Sukh-E, with vocals from Ammy Virk, Gurnam Bhullar, Kamal Khan, Divya Bhatt, Neetu Bhalla and B Praak. Also, Khan won "Best Playback Singer" Award.

Qismat was released worldwide on 21 September 2018 by White Hill Studios The film attracted positive reviews from critics, with some highlighting it as Virk's best performance at the time, while some criticized film's length. Commercially, the film has grossed ₹28 crore (US$2.9 million) in its theatrical run, and it ran for more than 50 days. The film is one of the highest-grossing Punjabi films of all time and second highest grossing Punjabi film of 2018. The film won Best Film (critics) award at 9th PTC Punjabi Film Awards, and was nominated for Best Film award at PTC Awards and Brit Asia Film Awards.

The sequel was announced in May 2019. Sidhu, Virk, Mehta, Jaani, and B Praak returned for the sequel, titled Qismat 2 and was released on 23 September 2021.

== Plot ==
The film begins with Shivjit (Ammy Virk) asking his family members to send him off to Chandigarh to attend college. He had already failed twice so his family was reluctant at first, wanting him to marry Aman (Tania), but they send him to Chandigarh. As soon as he reaches Chandigarh, he starts searching for a casual relationship, getting attracted to Bani (Sargun Mehta) who lives in the same apartment building. Bani is a modern and confident girl who finds her boyfriend cheating on her. To humiliate him, she gets Shiva's help by asking him to pose as her fake boyfriend. After some encounters between the two, they become close. Due to Bani's boyfriend's cheating, she agrees to the arranged marriage. Shiva is sent off from her neighbourhood because of Bani's strict father Gurnam Singh (Guggu Gill). Soon Bani's alliance gets fixed and Shiva goes back to his village. Shiva now meets Aman and is about to marry her when Bani's father comes to take him along. After separation from Shiva, Bani's health deteriorates. She suffers a chronic illness and severe infection. Shiva visits her and helps in her recovery, but soon he has to leave for his marriage about which he informs Bani, later Bani's reports improve. While Shiva is wedding shopping with Aman, he confesses to her about his love for Bani who understands him and lets him go. When Shiva reaches the hospital, Bani is dead, the two lovers are then separated by destiny.

== Cast ==
- Ammy Virk as Shivjit Singh Gill 'Shiva'
- Sargun Mehta as Bani Kaur
- Guggu Gill as SHO Gurnam Singh, Bani's father
- Satwant Kaur as Bani's mother
- Tania as Amandeep Kaur 'Aman', Shivjit's fiancé
- Harby Sangha as Golgappe Wala
- Hardeep Gill as Shivjit's Taaya
- Baljinder Kaur as Shivjit's Taayi
- Raj Dhaliwal as Anmol Bhabi- PG Lady
- Mandeep Mani as Himmatt Singh
- Jasneet Kaur as Raavi, Bani's sister
- Jashanjeet as Anmol Bhabi's husband
- Gurpreet Bhangu as Hostel Warden
- Honey Mattu as Laundry Guy
- Ansh Tejpal as Ansh
- Sumer Singh as Sumer
- Samaya as Upma, Himachal girl
- Manveer Rai as Nurse
- Arvinder Bhatti as Doctor

== Production ==
=== Development and pre-production ===
A single titled Qismat was released by Ammy Virk starring Sargun Mehta in its music video which got huge success and was one of the most successful hits of Ammy Virk. When Jagdeep Sidhu was asked would their be any similarity between film and song, he denied by saying that genre of song was sad whereas film is romedy. The film was written by Jagdeep Sidhu even before the release of song Qismat but was untitled yet. Also, the film was written for Bollywood and was narrated to Sushant Singh Rajput, Aditya Roy Kapoor, Varun Dhawan, Ayushmann Khurrana, Vicky Kaushal, Kartik Aaryan, Shraddha Kapoor and to leading production houses – Yash Raj, Balaji, T-Series, Dharma by Sidhu but wasn’t working and one of his friend asked Sidhu to make the film in Punjabi. After the film was signed producers suggested Sidhu to direct the film by himself only.

He wanted to direct the film with new lead actors. As, Virk is his old friend and have done many films together before said he would do the film. Then, Tania was being considered as a lead actress but Sidhu wasn’t sure. Sidhu said, “One day Sargun came to meet Ammy and we just shared the film with her. As soon as she heard the script, she wanted to do it.” Sargun wrote, "Jab Jaggi Ne Mujhe yeh film Sunayi thi tabhi Meri Aankhon Mein Aansu they" means "when Jaggi was narrating this film to her she was crying". So, due to similarity in characters and crew of film and song, the film was titled as Qismat. There were also some shooting locations in Chandigarh and Benaras similar in song and film. In an interview with PTC Punjabi Ammy and Sargun disclosed that they both signed the film just few days after the release of song and only film signed by Sargun releasing in 2018. Her last film Lahoriye was released 16 months ago from Qismat.

=== Filming and post-production ===
Qismat was filmed in a single schedule of 45 days in Chandigarh and other villages of Punjab. Principal photography of the film was started on 13 February 2018 at Anandpur Kalud (village in Punjab) and ran till 31 March 2018 where Jalesh Oberoi served as cinematographer. The last scene where Bani dies in the hospital was a dilemma for Sidhu and he kept it for filming. And, finally decides to not spoil the originality of the concept and was shot similar to screenplay. Sidhu in an interview described the film experience as “friendly vibe” and “comfortable” for him as compared to his 2019 film Shadaa.

Arjun Rathod served as art director, background score was composed by Gurmeet Singh and Sandeep Saxena whereas post-production was done by Varun Bansal. Choreography for film was done by Mehul Gadani, Arvind Thakur and Sunil Thakur whereas Japneet Dhingra served as costume designer. Qismat was edited by Manish More and its final cut ran for 137 minutes. British Board of Film Classification passed the film uncut of runtime 137 minutes 21 seconds. Overseas distribution rights for the film were acquired by B4U Network Ltd. In India, the film was rated as 'U' category and passed with runtime 140 minutes.

== Soundtrack ==
Qismat

Soundtrack album by B Praak & Sukh-E
- Released: August 2018
- Recorded: 2017–2018
- Genre: Feature film soundtrack
- Length: 26:46
- Language: Punjabi
- Label: Speed Records

B Praak & Sukh-E chronology
Qismat (2018)	Sufna (2020)

Soundtrack of Qismat is composed by B Praak and Sukhe was released on label Speed Records whereas lyrics were penned by Jaani. B Praak has given music in four songs and Sukh-E has produced two dance numbers of the film.

First song of the film "Kaun Hoye Ga" sung by B Praak and Divya Bhatt was released on 24 August 2018 which received good response and trends on YouTube and other sites. Second song of the romcom "Pasand Jatt Di" sung by lead actor Ammy Virk was repeased on 5 September 2018. This song was also written by Jaani whereas music was given by Sukh-E. Third song the romantic one "Awaaz" sung by Kamal Khan was released on 11 September 2018. Lyrics of this song were also written by Jaani whereas music was composed by B Praak. Later the songs "Gallan Teriya", "Fakira" and "Dholna" were released. In an interview, Sidhu disclosed that, "Dholna" song was originally in the film Sargi but was removed in editing due to highly intense emotions of songs wasn't matching the film. He was one to add the song in the film while other opposed. Full album of Qismat was released on 21 September 2018 on Google Play Music and other websites it received the good reviews from critics and audience alike. On Google Play Music 164 users rated it 4.2 out of 5. Gurlove Singh of BookMyShow described the film's music as "soulful".

=== Track List ===
No.	Title	Lyrics	Music	Singer(s)	Length
1.	"Kaun Hoyega"	Jaani	B Praak	B Praak; Divya Bhatt	4:09
2.	"Pasand Jatt Di"	Jaani	Sukh-E	Ammy Virk	3:14
3.	"Awaaz"	Jaani	B Praak	Kamal Khan	4:42
4.	"Gallan Teriyan"	Jaani	Sukh-E	Ammy Virk, Neetu Bhalla	2:43
5.	"Fakira"	Jaani	B Praak	Gurnam Bhullar	4:09
6.	"Dholna"	Jaani	B Praak	B Praak	3:46
Total length:					26:46

== Release and marketing ==
Qismat was released worldwide on 21 September 2018 and distributed by White Hill Studios with major territories India, Canada, United States, United Kingdom, Australia and New Zealand. In previous two years, Ammy's two films Nikka Zaildar and Nikka Zaildar 2 in almost end of the September which were hits. So, this film is considered lucky for him and Qismat was also released in the same date.

First look of the film was shared on 14 August, then the song "Kaun Hoyega" sung by B Praak was released on 24 August and trailer of the film was released on 30 August by Speed Records and further the other songs of the film were released one by one before release of the film.

== Reception ==
=== Box office ===
Qismat had grossed ₹28 crore worldwide. It became one of the highest-grossing Punjabi films of all time, as well as second highest-grossing Punjabi film of 2018, second highest-grossing film for Ammy Virk and Sargun Mehta after their debut Angrej released in 2015.

According to Box Office India Qismat opened very good. The collections of the film were three times Shahid Kapoor's starrer Batti Gul Meter Chalu in cities of Punjab. The film opened as the second highest grosser of 2018 behind Carry On Jatta 2 also the film had eighth highest opening ever for Punjabi films. On its opening day the film grossed ₹2.3 crore and ₹1.8 crore nett in India. It collect ₹2.37 crore on its second day and took a total of ₹4.67 crore in just two days On its third day film grossed ₹2.66 crore in India making the weekend total ₹7.33 crore. According to Bollywood Hungama at overseas, the film performed better than all other Indian releases collecting ₹71.51 lacs at United States, ₹1.27 crore at Canada, ₹44.28 lacs at United Kingdom, ₹55.64 lacs at Australia and ₹17.25 lacs at New Zealand in its opening weekend. The film opened as fifth highest opening weekend of all time behind Carry On Jatta 2, Sardaar Ji, Sardaar Ji 2 and Manje Bistre also the film was announced as a huge hit after its weekend by Box Office India. In four days the film netted ₹6.03 crore at domestic box office and the Monday collections dropped just 25% from the good opening day.

In its second weekend, the film dominates even on new releases like Parahuna and Sui Dhaaga in Canada. In 10 days, the film collected est. ₹9 crore at overseas including ₹1.64 crore in US, ₹4.48 crore in Canada, ₹89.28 lacs in UK, ₹1.37 crore in Australia and ₹38.77 lacs in New Zealand. The film continued its blockbuster run in third week, till its third weekend film grossed ₹1.95 crore in USA, ₹5.82 crore in Canada, ₹1.24 crore in UK, ₹1.6 crore in Australia and ₹43.86 lacs in New Zealand and remained in top charts in some countries.

=== Critical reception ===
Qismat received positive reviews from audience and critics alike. All the cast and crew of the film were praised.

Jasmine Singh of The Tribune appreciated Jagdeep Sidhu, saying, "Only a few directors have managed to dabble with romance on screen, and Jagdeep Sidhu is one such director who has handled the subject with ‘love’." Reviewer adds about dialogues, "The dialogues in the film are light yet hitting, in fact it has hundred romantic pick up lines that might come to your rescue someday. The film has dollops of humorous dialogues, the credit for which goes to the dialogue writer and Ammy Virk for delivering them in such a way that even the saddest person wouldn’t help smiling." Amit Arora of Times Of India rated the film as 3.0 out 5. Praised most the soundtrack of the film, saying, "The only thing that makes the first half bearable is the music. ‘Pasand Jatt Di’ and ‘Gallan Teriya’ are already a hit and even during a short drive, you are likely to catch one or the other on the radio. ‘Kaun Hoyega’ and ‘Fakira’ have been woven well into the script and Jaani and B Praak deserve credit as music directors." But on other side the reviewer criticised the tragedic scenes in the film, length of the film and chemistry between Ammy and Sargun in first half.

== Accolades ==
Award	Date of ceremony (Note: Date is linked to the article about the awards held that year, wherever possible.)	Category	Recipient and nominee	Result	Ref(s)
PTC Punjabi Film Awards 2019	16 March 2019	Best Film (critics)	Qismat	Won	
PTC Punjabi Film Awards 2019	16 March 2019	Best Director	Jagdeep Sidhu	Nominated	
PTC Punjabi Film Awards 2019	16 March 2019	Best Actress	Sargun Mehta	Won	
PTC Punjabi Film Awards 2019	16 March 2019	Best Debut Director	Jagdeep Sidhu	Won	
PTC Punjabi Film Awards 2019	16 March 2019	Best Supporting Actor	Guggu Gill	Nominated	
PTC Punjabi Film Awards 2019	16 March 2019	Best Playback Singer (Male)	Kamal Khan	Won	
PTC Punjabi Film Awards 2019	16 March 2019	Best Music Director	B Praak	Nominated	
PTC Punjabi Film Awards 2019	16 March 2019	Best Dialogues	Jagdeep Sidhu	Nominated	
PTC Punjabi Film Awards 2019	16 March 2019	Best Screenplay	Jagdeep Sidhu	Nominated	
PTC Punjabi Film Awards 2019	16 March 2019	Best Story	Jagdeep Sidhu	Nominated	
PTC Punjabi Film Awards 2019	16 March 2019	Best Background Score	Gurmeet Singh, Sandeep Saxena	Nominated	

== Sequels ==
In an interview director Jagdeep Sidhu told, "Qismat movie team is working on to bring another movie with good content. This team includes Ammy Virk, Sargun Mehta, Jagdeep Sidhu, Jaani and B Praak. They are all set to entertain the audience with another Punjabi movie but the title of that movie is not yet finalized. Jagdeep have told that may be they will give it title Qismat 2 or they will decide something else related to the movie." Also, Sidhu shared a post on Instagram writing "Based on Soni-Paalo and Bazi Pichi" and captioned "writing start". In May 2019, he confirmed the sequel with same crew. In July 2019, Virk also confirmed the film on his official social media handles. On 11 September 2019, Sidhu released the title poster of Qismat 2 with the release date as 18 September 2020. Due to COVID-19 pandemic the shooting of the sequel was delayed. Finally the filming began on 17 October 2020. The film finally released on 23 September 2021.

Qismat 3, the third part of the film series is in development.
