= Sher Bagga =

2022 Indian Punjabi-language comedy-drama film

- Directed by: Jagdeep Sidhu
- Written by: Jagdeep Sidhu
- Produced by: Ammy Virk; Daljit Thind
- Starring: Ammy Virk; Sonam Bajwa; Nirmal Rishi; Deep Sehgal
- Cinematography: Navneet Misser
- Edited by: Manish More
- Music by: Avvy Sra; Jaymeet; Sunny Vik; Oye Kunaal
- Production company: Ammy Virk Productions
- Distributed by: Thind Motion Films; White Hill Studios
- Release date: 24 June 2022
- Running time: 146 minutes
- Country: India
- Language: Punjabi

Sher Bagga is a 2022 Indian Punjabi-language, comedy-drama film directed by Jagdeep Sidhu under the banner of Ammy Virk Productions. The film is produced by Ammy Virk and Daljeet Thind. The film stars Ammy Virk, Sonam Bajwa and Nirmal Rishi in the lead roles. The film was released worldwide in cinemas on 24 June 2022.

== Premise ==
Dilsher, a simple village man from Punjab, has set out to meet his fiancé in London. Before meeting her, he bumps into the hot headed Gulab, a single child of divorced parents, embittered by the experience of her parents and searching for true love. But their meeting takes an unconventional turn when they (unintentionally) end up sharing intimacy for one night which results into an unexpected pregnancy. What follows is a story of realization for both as they experience that they are each other’s true love.

== Cast ==
- Ammy Virk as Dilsher Singh
- Sonam Bajwa as Gulab Kaur
- Nirmal Rishi as Bebe, Dilsher's grandmother
- Deep Sehgal
- Kaka Kautki
- Baninder Bunny
- Rup Khatkar
- Jasneet Kaur
- Gurdiyal Singh

== Production ==
=== Development ===
The film was announced in June 2021 with lead cast of Ammy Virk and Sonam Bajwa.

=== Filming ===
Principal photography of Sher Bagga began in July 2021. The film was shot in parts of England and Punjab.

== Music ==
The music of the film is composed by Avvy Sra, Jaymeet, Sunny Vik and Oye Kunaal while the background score is composed by Sandeep Saxena.

Tracklist
No.	Title	Lyrics	Music	Singer(s)	Length
1.	"Raja Jatt"	Happy Raikoti	Avvy Sra	Ammy Virk, Simar Kaur	2:46
2.	"Rab"	Farmaan	Oye Kunaal	Oye Kunaal	3:17
3.	"Musafira"	Raj Fatehpur	Sunny Vik	Vikas Mann	2:24
4.	"Jhanjra"	Happy Raikoti	Avvy Sra	Ammy Virk	1:58
5.	"Jaadu Di Shadi"	Shera Dhaliwal, Kiran	Jaymeet	Simran Bhardwaj	3:09

== Release and Marketing ==
The trailer of the film was released on 23 May 2022. The film was scheduled for a theatrical release on 10 June 2022 but was postponed due to the death of the singer Sidhu Moose Wala. The film was released in theatres worldwide on 24 June 2022.

== Reception ==
A critic from Times of India gave the film 4 out of 5 stars and said "the film is a pure love and a romantic ode to modern love". A critic from The Tribune gave a positive review and said the film was written for Ayushmann Khurrana, but Ammy Virk-Sonam Bajwa jodi did complete justice to the film.
