= Moh (film) =

2022 Punjabi film directed by Jagdeep Sidhu

- Release poster
- Directed by: [Jagdeep sidhu]
- Screenplay by: Shiv Tarsem Singh; Govind Singh; Jagdeep Sidhu
- Story by: Shiv Tarsem Singh; Govind Singh
- Produced by: Ankit Vijan; Navdeep Narula; Kiran Yadav; Girish Kumar; Ricky Singh Bedi; Ramandeep Singh; Barinder Singh
- Starring: Sargun Mehta; Gitaz Bindrakhia
- Narrated by: Amrit Amby; Harsh Gurjar
- Cinematography: Navneet Misser
- Edited by: Manish More
- Music by: Jaani & B Praak &Deepak Sharma daikin wale
- Production companies: Shri Narotam Ji Studios; Tips Films Ltd.; Orion Studios
- Distributed by: White Hill Studios
- Release date: 16 September 2022
- Running time: 149 minutes
- Country: India
- Language: Punjabi

Moh (pronounced [moːɦ] (trans. attachment) is a 2022 Indian Punjabi-language romantic drama film directed by Jagdeep Sidhu. The film bankrolled by Shri Narotam Ji Productions, Tips Films Ltd. and Orion Studios, stars Sargun Mehta and singer Gitaz Bindrakhia in his acting debut. It depicts a doomed affair of a teenager with a married woman. It was released theatrically on 16 September 2022 by White Hill Studios.

== Cast ==
- Sargun Mehta as Gorey
- Gitaj Bindrakhia as Rabbi
- Amrit Amby as Rana
- Prabh Bains as Gurinder
- Prakash Gadhu as Rabbi's father
- Balraj Sidhu
- Sukhdev Ladhar
- Aman Suthdar
- Ikatar Singh
- Jashanjit Gosha
- Parminder Barnala
- Anita Meet
- Kumar Ajay
- Kulwinder Sidhu
- Vikram Pannu
- Fateh Siyan

== Production ==
Director Jagdeep Sidhu launched the film on 24 September 2021 after the success of his earlier film Qismat 2 and announced the tentative release date as 23 September 2022. Principal photography began on 9 February 2022. Moh marks as the first film of Gitaj Bindrakhia.

== Soundtrack ==
Moh

Soundtrack album by B Praak
- Released: 21 September 2022
- Recorded: 2021–2022
- Genre: Feature film soundtrack
- Length: 19:21
- Language: Punjabi
- Label: Tips Punjabi

B Praak chronology
Lekh (2022)	Moh (2022)	Honeymoon (2022)

Soundtrack of Moh is composed by B Praak, lyrics by Jaani and the songs are sung by B Praak. First track "Sub Kuchh" was released on 22 August 2022 by Tips Punjabi.

=== Track list ===
No.	Title	Lyrics	Singer(s)	Length
1.	"Sub Kuchh"	Jaani	B Praak	4:16
2.	"Salooq"	Jaani	B Praak	5:07
3.	"Meri Zuban"	Jaani	Kamal Khan	3:47
4.	"Mere Kol"	Jaani	Afsana Khan	4:02
5.	"Aulaad"	Jaani	Jaani	2:11
Total length:				19:21

== Reception ==
Kiddaan.com gave the film 4 stars out of 5, praising performances, direction and dialogues. They criticised the slow screenplay but appreciated the climax. Concluding they stated, "Moh is a surreal and satisfying experience for everyone who craves to watch genuine and pure emotions on silver screens." They further wrote, "Moh a typical Jagdeep Sidhu film, has a beautiful story, elegant dialogues and some brilliant performances." Neha Vashist of the Times of India rated the film 4 stars out of 5 and wrote, "it is a kind of film which is high on the emotional quotient and has been presented in a way that even the tragedy is painted in different hues of beauty and intensity." Vashist praising the performances wrote, "it appears to be Sargun’s best performance so far", and writing about Gitaz Bindrakhia's debut she stated, "well it appears that there could have been no better project for his entry into Pollywood." Vashist appreciated the music and climax of the film and concluded, "Moh is a pure treat made with good content and emotions." Sheetal of The Tribune wrote, "In one sentence, Punjabi film Moh is pure poetry! And the director, Jagdeep Sidhu, has lived up to his reputation."
