= Tania (actress) =

Indian actress (born 1993)

- Tania in 2026
- Born: 6 May 1993 (age 33); Jamshedpur, Bihar (now Jharkhand), India
- Education: Guru Nanak Dev University
- Occupation: Actress
- Years active: 2016-present
- Awards: Full list

Tania (born 6 May 1993) is an Indian actress and model who works in Punjabi cinema. She made her acting debut in 2018 and has since appeared in a range of Punjabi films. She has been nominated for two Brit Asia TV Awards, winning Best Supporting Actress for her performance in Qismat (2018).

== Early life and education ==
Tania was born on 6 May 1993 in Jamshedpur, Bihar to parents from Punjab. Brought up in Amritsar, she has one younger sister Tamannah.

She attended Guru Nanak Dev University and BBK DAV College for Women, Amritsar where she won the "Best Actor of the Year" award each year from 2012 to 2016. She completed her Bachelor of Design from BBK DAV College and a postgraduate degree in project management from Canada.

During her academic years, she developed an interest in acting and dance. She is also a classical dancer.

== Career ==
She was selected for the 2016 Hindi film Sarabjit to play Sarabjit’s daughter, but as the filming schedule conflicted with her final exams, she had to forgo the role. Her first film role was in Son of Manjeet Singh (2018) but that film was not released until after Qismat (2018). She made her acting debut with Qismat. She subsequently appeared in Guddiyan Patole (2019) and made a cameo appearance in Rabb Da Radio 2 (2019). She gained wider recognition after appearing in Sufna (2020), her debut as a lead actress. She has also made cameo appearances in Qismat 2 and Nikka Zaildar 4. Her later films include Bajre Da Sitta (2022), Oye Makhna (2022), Lekh (2023), Mitran Da Naa Chalda (2023), and Godday Godday Chaa (2023). Godday Godday Chaa won the National Film Award for Best Punjabi Feature Film at the 71st National Film Awards (2024). Her 2025 releases include Phaphey Kuttniyan, Mithde, Illti, and Godday Godday Chaa 2.

== Other work ==
In addition to films, she has appeared in Punjabi music videos and brand endorsements.

== Filmography ==
Key
†	Denotes films that have not yet been released

Year	Film	Role	Notes
2018	Qismat	Aman	Debut film
2018	Son of Manjeet Singh	Simran	
2019	Guddiyan Patole	Nicole	
2019	Rabb Da Radio 2	Raaji	
2020	Sufna	Teg	Debut as lead actress
2021	Qismat 2	Mazaj Kaur	
2022	Lekh	Ronak	
2022	Bajre Da Sitta	Roop	
2022	Oye Makhna	Rimple	
2023	Mitran Da Naa Chalda	Binder	
2023	Godday Godday Chaa	Harsimran Kaur "Nikko"	
2025	Illti	Harbhajan	
2025	Mithde		
2025	Godday Godday Chaa 2		

=== Music videos ===
Title	Year	Artist(s)	Video Director	Label
"Teri Meri Ladayi"	2020	Maninder Buttar	Rahul Chahal	White Hill Music
"U & Me"	2020	Gippy Grewal	Baljit Singh Deo	T-Series
"Kya Baat Aa"	2020	Karan Aujla	Sukh Sanghera	Rehaan Records
"Teri Jatti"	2022	Ammy Virk	Mahi Sandhu	Burfi Music
"Ja Tere Bina"	2022	Happy Raikoti	Dilsher Singh, Khushpal Singh	White Hill Music
"For a Reason"	2025	Karan Aujla and Ikky	Agam Mann and Aseem Mann	Rehaan Records

== Awards and nominations ==
Year	Film	Award Ceremony	Category	Result
2019	Qismat	Brit Asia TV Awards	Best Supporting Actress	Won
2019	Qismat	Brit Asia TV Awards	Best Debut Performance	Nominated
2021	Qismat 2	PTC Punjabi Film Awards	Promising Star of the Year	Won
