= Illti =

2025 Indian Punjabi film

- Directed by: Varinder Ramgarhia
- Written by: Gurpreet Bhullar
- Produced by: KV Dhillon; Jagjeet Sandhu
- Starring: Jagjeet Sandhu; Tania
- Release date: 14 February 2025
- Country: India
- Language: Punjabi

Illti is a 2025 Indian Punjabi-language comedy film directed by Varinder Ramgarhia and written by Gurpreet Bhullar. The film is produced by Kv Dhillon and Jagjeet Sandhu. It stars Jagjeet Sandhu and Tania in lead roles and Raghveer Boli, Anita Devgan, Surendra Sharma, and Daljinder Basran in supporting roles. The film was released in theaters on 14 February 2025.

== Cast ==
- Jagjeet Sandhu as Illti
- Tania as Harbhajan
- Yograj Singh
- Raghveer Boli as Sandy Grewal
- Anita Devgan
- Surendra Sharma
- Daljinder Basran

== Filming ==
The movie was filmed over two months, from 15 August to 1 October, in several scenic locations across Punjab, including Ropar, Mohali, and Fatehgarh Sahib.

== Reception ==
Punjabi Mania rated iLLTi 4 out of 5 stars, praising its use of parallel timelines, performances and visual effects, while highlighting its environmental theme.

5 Dariya News awarded the film 4.5 out of 5 stars. Its review praised the screenplay, humour and performances, but noted that the second half felt stretched and affected the pacing.

Desi Channel also rated the film 4.5 out of 5 stars, highlighting the performances, cinematography, music and narrative spanning the Stone Age and the modern era.
