= Dildariyaan =

2015 film by Pankaj Batra

- Directed by: Pankaj Batra
- Written by: Jagdeep Sidhu
- Screenplay by: Vineet
- Produced by: Monty Shoor; Rakesh Thakar; Amrinder Mahal
- Starring: Jassie Gill; Sagarika Ghatge; Binnu Dhillon; Guggu Gill; Karamjit Anmol; Razia Sukhvir
- Cinematography: Gurpreet Khetla
- Music by: Jatinder Shah
- Production companies: Battalion Entertainment; Yuvika Films
- Release date: 9 October 2015
- Country: India
- Language: Punjabi

Dildariyaan is an Indian Punjabi-language romance film directed by Pankaj Batra. Jassie Gill and Sagarika Ghatge played the lead roles, marking Ghatge's debut in a Punjabi movie. Dildariyaan was released on 9 October 2015.

== Plot ==
Paali (Sagarika Ghatge) lives at home with her father (Guggu Gill) in their small village. To complete her Higher Studies, Paali shifts to Chandigarh where she meets Parvan (Jassi Gill), a smart collegian who falls in love with her. However, Paali is less than interested because her father has already found her a NRI husband. Although Paali tells Parvan about her arranged husband, Parvan refuses to give up and seeks to impress on Paali's father that he is a better match. He then convinces Paali's father on their marriage and Paali's father calls her to come back to India.

== Cast ==
- Jassie Gill as Parwaan
- Sagarika Ghatge as Paali
- Binnu Dhillon as Bus Conductor
- Karamjit Anmol as Pardhaan, Parwaan's best friend
- Baninder Banni as Scootry, Parwaan's best friend
- Guggu Gill as Paali's father
- Manpreet Kaur Gill as Aman
- Razia Sukhbir as IELTS Teacher
- Rajwinder Singh Bhinder as Teacher

== Soundtrack ==
Dildariyaan

Soundtrack album by Jatinder Shah
- Released: 27 August 2015
- Genre: Feature film soundtrack
- Length: 16:15
- Language: Punjabi
- Label: Speed Records
External audio
- Audio Jukebox on YouTube

The soundtrack of Dildariyaan consists of 5 songs composed by Jatinder Shah.

Tracklist
No.	Title	Lyrics	Singer(s)	Length
1.	"Aazma"	Happy Raikoti	Jassi Gill	03:44
2.	"Ghagre Di Lauwn"	Rachhpal Malhi	Jassi Gill & Kaur B	03:00
3.	"Rabb Kise Di Na Todhe"	Babu Singh Maan	Jaspinder Narula & Rahat Fateh Ali Khan	03:36
4.	"Gatti Gutti"	Happy Raikoti	Jassi Gill	02:48
5.	"Tera Pyar"	Maninder Gill	Jassi Gill	03:10
Total length:				16:15

== Reception ==
=== Box office ===
Dildariyaan grossed ₹3,717,000 (US$39,000) from international markets in its first weekend.
