= Mitran Da Naa Chalda =

2023 Indian Punjabi-language film

- Directed by: Pankaj Batra
- Written by: Rakesh Dhawan
- Produced by: Pankaj Batra; Preeta Batra
- Starring: Gippy Grewal; Tania; Shweta Tiwari; Raj Shokar
- Cinematography: Sapan Narula
- Edited by: Rohit Dhiman
- Music by: Avvy Sra; Gurmoh; Jassi Katyal
- Production companies: Pankaj Batra Films; Zee Studios
- Distributed by: Zee Studios
- Release date: 8 March 2023
- Running time: 118 minutes
- Country: India
- Language: Punjabi

Mitran Da Naa Chalda is a 2023 Indian Punjabi-language comedy drama film directed by Pankaj Batra. The film stars Gippy Grewal, Tania, Raj Shokar and Renu Kaushal. The film was released under the banner of Zee Studios and Pankaj Batra films.

== Plot ==
Laadi quits his studies because he stammers. Years later, he ends up working for his uncle who is a lawyer and decides to defend four women accused of murder.

== Cast ==
- Gippy Grewal as Gurlaath Singh (Laddi)
- Tania as Balwinder Kaur (Binder)
- Raj Shokar as Karamjeet Kaur (Karam)
- Shweta Tiwari as Indu Mittal
- Renu Kaushal as Heena Chouhan
- Nirmal Rishi
- Hardip Gill
- Anita Devgan
- Sanju Solankt Rangdev as Judge
- Deedar Gill as Dr. Akash Mittal
- Aarchi Sachdeva as Aarchi Arora
- Harnidh
- Resty Kamboi
- Sanjiv Attri
- Rajeev Mehra
- Surinder Narula

== Music ==
Track listing
No.	Title	Lyrics	Music	Singer(s)	Length
1.	"Jehri Ve"	Raj Ranjodh	Avvy Sra	Jasmine Sandlas, Gippy Grewal	3:43
2.	"Dhola"	Ricky Khan	Jassi Katyal	Rahat Fateh Ali Khan	3:43
3.	"Tod Ni Koi"	Amrit Maan	Avvy Sra	Gippy Grewal	2:38
4.	"Chamba"	Happy Raikoti	Avvy Sra	Gurlez Akhtar	2:19
5.	"Nede Nede"	Ahen	Gurmoh	Ahen, Gurmoh	2:27
Total length:					14:50

=== Home media ===
The film was digitally released on 14 April 2023 on ZEE5.

== Reception ==
The film received mixed to positive reviews from critics. The Indian Express rated the film 2 out of 5 stars and wrote, "Not-so-subtle drama that bites off more than it can chew". Archika Khurana from The Times of India gave the film rating of 4 out of 5 stars and wrote, " Gippy Grewal's social commentary strikes the right balance of levity and drama".
