= Ammy Virk =

Indian singer, actor and producer

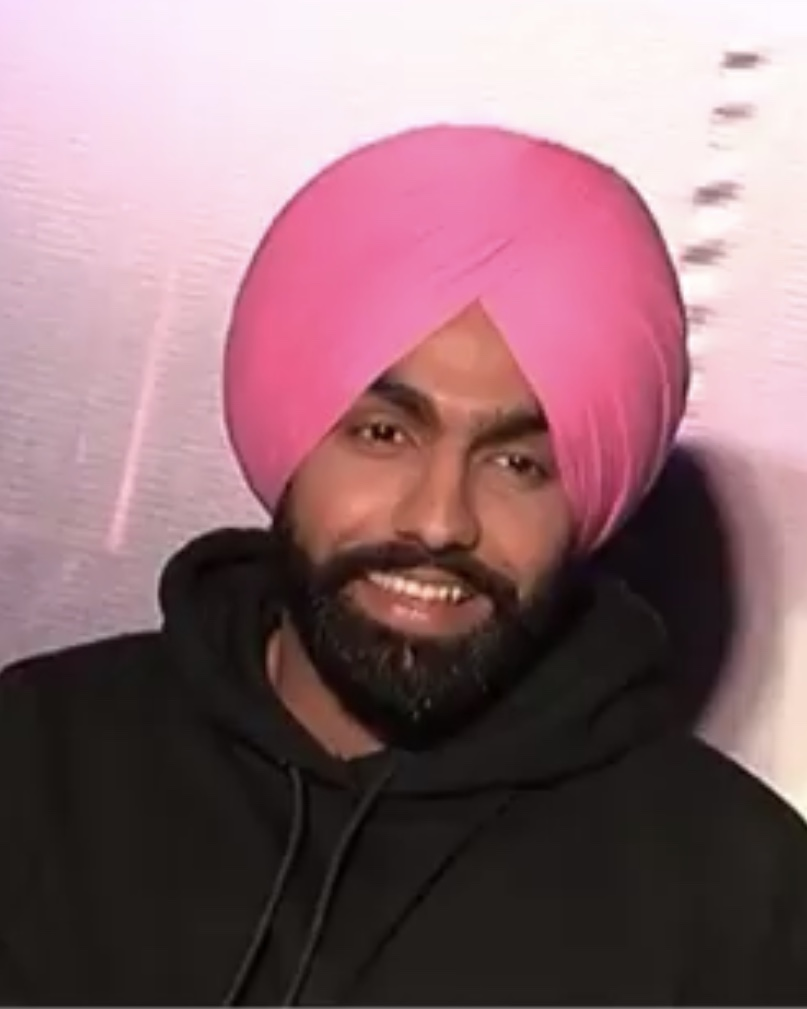
- Virk in 2019
- Born: Amninderpal Singh Virk; 11 May 1992 (age 34); Nabha, Patiala, Punjab, India
- Education: M.Sc Biotechnology
- Occupations: Actor; singer; producer
- Years active: 2011 - present
- Musical career
- Labels: Speed; T-Series; Sony Music India
- Website: Ammy Virk on Facebook

Amninderpal Singh Virk (born 11 May 1992), better known as Ammy Virk, is an Indian singer, actor and producer. He established himself as a singer in the Punjabi music industry, with his sophomore album Jattizm winning the PTC Punjabi Music Award for Album of the Year in 2013. Virk expanded into acting playing Hakam in the historical romance Punjabi film Angrej (2015) for which he won the Best Debut Actor Award at PTC Punjabi Film Awards. He later found the production house Villagers Film Studio and a distribution company In House Group in 2017. The Tribune described Virk's portrayal of Nikka in the Nikka Zaildar film series as one of the most beloved characters of Punjabi cinema.

Virk enjoyed further success with Punjabi films Bambukat (2016), Ardaas (2016), Laung Laachi (2018), Qismat (2018), and Saukan Saunkne (2022). His films Angrej and Qismat are two of the highest grossing Punjabi films of all time. Virk is also recognised for his Patiala-Shahi turban. He made his Bollywood debut with film Bhuj: The Pride Of India (2021), and went on to work in other Hindi ventures like Bad Newz (2024) and Khel Khel Mein (2024).

== Early life ==
Born as Amninderpal Singh Virk on 11 May 1992 to a Sikh Jat family in the village of Lohar Majra in Nabha, Patiala. He did a BSc in Biotechnology at the Punjabi University in Patiala. In an interview with The Tribune he said, "It was my mother who told me that I should try singing. I have learned it. I am a singer because of my mother and I love her for having faith in me."

== Career ==
=== Music ===
Virk credits his mother with encouraging his music career. While completing a biotechnology degree, he gained recognition after his song "Ikk Pal" went viral online. In an interview with The Print, Virk stated the song was originally written for his then-girlfriend in 2012, who later convinced him to release it publicly.

His early career was further established by the songs "Qismat," "Haan Karde," "Yaar Amli," "Jatt Da Sahara," and "Chandigarh Diyan Kudia," the latter of which solidified his status in the Punjabi music industry. Virk is noted for incorporating folk and Sufi music into his work and for his signature Patiala-Shahi turban. Subsequent releases "Zindabad Yaarian" and "Taara" gained further popularity. His 2013 debut album, Jattizm, received the Album of the Year award at the PTC Punjabi Music Awards. Virk's music has also featured on the soundtracks of Punjabi films in which he starred, including Bambukat, Laung Laachi, and Sufna, among others. In 2018, he made his Hindi film music debut when he performed "Daryaa" alongside Shahid Mallya for the Hindi film Manmarziyaan. The song received the awards for Best Song and Best Male Playback Singer at the 2019 News18 Reel Awards. In 2023, Virk released his third studio album, Layers, featuring production from Jaymeet, Dilmaan, and Black Virus.

=== Acting ===
Virk started his film career with Angrej produced by Rhythm Boyz Entertainment and released in 2015. He played the role of Haakam which shows a negative role. Jasmine Singh of The Tribune said, “Angrej is also the ground for singer Ammy Virk, who opens his innings here. If it were just looks, the singer gets a five on five; as far as dialogue delivery goes, there is more work that needs to be done. All the same, he makes his character look and sound real.” Also, he won Best Debut Actor Award at PTC Punjabi Film Awards for his role in the film.

In 2016, his second film Ardaas directed by Gippy Grewal was released. In the film he played the supporting role of Agyapal Singh(Aasi). Divya Pal of News18 said, “It is interesting to see how the film's supporting actors serve up strong performances. Ammy Virk is suitably striking as Aasi [...]” Uttam of Punjabi Teshan said, “[...] Ammy Virk has improved so much, he acted like a good theatre artist. [...]” Later in July, his film Bambukat was released being his second collaboration with Rhythm Boyz Entertainment. The film was directed by Pankaj Batra and was Virk's first film as a lead Actor. Gurlove Singh of BookMyShow said, "Ammy Virk is a revelation. He has proven that he chooses his scripts carefully. [...] he packs a solid punch in Bambukat. He has definitely grown as an actor. He is exceptional in the emotional scenes. [...] your heart goes out to Channan, and that's only because of Ammy Virk's effective portrayal." He won Best Actor Award at PTC Punjabi Film Awards shared with Amrinder Gill for his role of "Channan Singh" in the film and Best Actor Critics Award at Filmfare Awards Punjabi shared with Gurpreet Ghuggi. In September, he starred in Nikka Zaildar as Nikka.

In 2017, he started with playing a special appearance in the Tarsem Jassar's starrer Rabb Da Radio's song "Akh Boldi". In May, his thriller film Saab Bahadar was released. Jasmine Singh of The Tribune, said "Now, it's time for the Saab Bahadur to come in- Punjabi singer-actor Ammy Virk plays the real cop, the Saab Bahadur in the film [...] he nails it this time too." Gurlove Singh of BookMyShow said, "There's no denying the fact that Ammy Virk is the heart and soul of Saab Bahadar. He is portraying the titular role and has introduced us to a new brand of a cop with his spellbinding performance. He enacts his character with earnestness and authenticity. He is brilliant in every frame and charges assertively throughout the film. His portrayal of Saab Bahadar stamps the fact that he is one of the most sought-after actors in the Punjabi film industry these days." The film was critically praised but commercially it was not that good.

You can't experiment much. If you make an experimental film in Punjab, then I don't think it will work right now as the market is not that big. If the market grows, then more types of genres like action and suspense can also do well.

-Ammy Virk

In September 2017, his film Nikka Zaildar 2 sequel to Nikka Zaildar was released. The film was set in a bygone era and upon its release was announced HIT by Box Office India. Jasmine Singh of The Tribune said, "Actor-singer Ammy Virk melts into his character, just like he did in Nikka Zaildar. With a line of hits to his credit, Ammy is only growing as an artist. He has banged on comic timing, and the same can be said about his emotional scenes." Later, in December, Sat Shri Akaal England was released. In the film, Virk played the role of Major German Singh Mann. The film was not critically and commercially successful, but Virk's performance was appreciated. Manjit Singh of Santa Banta said, "Ammy is a natural actor who doesn't require much effort to bring out his best."

In 2018, he starred in Laung Laachi, playing the negative supporting role of Ajaypal Singh. The film was written and directed by Amberdeep Singh also starred in the film as a lead actor. The film was commercially successful and also one of highest grossing Punjabi films of 2018. Later, in May, Harjeeta was released. The film was based on Harjeet Singh, a hockey player who served as captain for the Indian hockey team and won the World Cup. Jasmine Singh of The Tribune praising his performance said, "It is hard not to notice the actor's hard work, whether it is adopting the real Tuli's young looks, his mannerism and his style. Ammy delivers an award-winning performance. Ammy has taken to the character like chalk and cheese."

In September, Qismat was released. The film was named after a song sung by himself only because of the similarity in the lead cast, crew and emotions. The film was written and directed by Jagdeep Sidhu. In the film, Virk played the role of Shivjit Singh Gill opposite Sargun Mehta in the film. Gurlove Singh of BookMyShow said, "Qismat belongs to Ammy Virk and Sargun Mehta. They are the heart and soul of the movie. They both give equally good, well-balanced and superlative performances. You cannot help but fall in love with their on-screen chemistry. They make you smile and cry several times in those two hours. It's hard to believe anyone else portraying Shivjit and Bani's roles." Jasmine Singh of The Tribune also praised the lead cast, saying, “Ammy Virk and Sargun Mehta share strong onscreen chemistry. Ammy makes every word he says achievable in real life. He is one effortless actor who can make the audiences laugh, cry and now, believe in true love.”

In 2019, his films Muklawa and Nikka Zaildar 3 were released. In Muklawa he co-starred with Sonam Bajwa for the third time after Nikka Zaildar and Nikka Zaildar 2. Actress Rose Sardana also starred in Muklawa for the first time alomgside Ammy Virk. In the same year, his film Chhalle Mundiyaan was released, as was Guddiyan Patole starring Gurnam Bhullar, produced by him.

His recent films in the Punjabi industry include Sarbala Ji and Godday Godday Chaa 2, both released in 2025.

==== Expansion into Bollywood ====
In 2021, he made his Bollywood debut in Bhuj: The Pride of India where he played the role of a fighter pilot. He also featured in another Bollywood film 83 directed by Kabir Khan. The film is based on the life of Indian cricket player Kapil Dev. Virk played the role of fast bowler Balwinder Sandhu. Virk appeared in the music video of the song "Filhaal 2" by B Praak. He was cast alongside Vicky Kaushal and Triptii Dimri in the 2024 Hindi comedy film Bad Newz. The film received mixed reviews but managed to be commercially successful at the box office. In the same year, he appeared in Khel Khel Mein as part of an ensemble cast consisting of Akshay Kumar, Taapsee Pannu, Vaani Kapoor, Aditya Seal, Pragya Jaiswal, and Fardeen Khan.

== Filmography ==
=== Films ===
Key
†	Denotes films that have not yet been released

List of film performances by Ammy Virk
Year	Film	Role	Notes	Ref.
2015	Angrej	Haakam		
2016	Ardaas	Agyapal Singh		
2016	Bambukat	Channan Singh		
2016	Nikka Zaildar	Nikka/Yadwinder		
2016	Dil Wali Gal	Ammy	Short film	
2017	Rabb Da Radio	Singer	Special appearance in the song "Akh Boldi"	
2017	Saab Bahadar	Kuldeep Singh/Saab Bahadar		
2017	Nikka Zaildar 2	Nikka		
2017	Sat Shri Akaal England	Major German Singh Mann		
2018	Laung Laachi	Ajitpal Singh	Also producer	
2018	Harjeeta	Harjeet Singh	Also producer	
2018	Qismat	Shivjit Singh Gill		
2018	Aate Di Chidi	Singer	Special appearance in the song "Muchh"	
2019	Muklawa	Shinda		
2019	Nikka Zaildar 3	Nikka Zaildar		
2020	Sufna	Jagjeet		
2021	Puaada	Jaggi		
2021	Bhuj: The Pride of India	Flight Lieutenant Vikram Singh Baj Jethaaz	Hindi film; Released on Disney+ Hotstar	
2021	Qismat 2	Shivjit Singh		
2021	83	Balwinder Sandhu	Hindi film	
2022	Aaja Mexico Challiye	Pamma	Also producer	
2022	Lekh	Maninder	Special appearance	
2022	Saunkan Saunkne	Nirmal Singh		
2022	Sher Bagga	Dilsher Singh	Also producer	
2022	Baajre Da Sitta	Roop's husband	Also producer	
2022	Laung Laachi 2	Ajaypal		
2022	Oye Makhna	Makhan Virk	Also producer	
2023	Annhi Dea Mazaak Ae	Raja		
2023	Phir Mel Karade Rabba	Nirmal Singh	Special appearance	
2023	Maurh	Jeona Maurh		
2023	Gaddi Jaandi Ae Chalaangaan Maardi	Happy		
2024	Kudi Haryane Val Di	Shivjot		
2024	Bad Newz	Gurbir Pannu	Hindi film	
2024	Khel Khel Mein	Harpreet Singh Sandhu	Hindi film	
2024	Arjantina †	TBA	Also producer	
2024	Dilaa Mereya †	TBA	Also producer	
2024	Jugni 1907 †	TBA	Also producer	
2025	Saunkan Saunkanay 2	Nirmal Singh	Punjabi film	
2025	Sarbala Ji	Gajjan	Punjabi film	
2026	Bambukat 2	Channan Singh	Punjabi film	
2026	Zakhma Toh Chardikala Tak	Beant Singh	Punjabi film	

=== As producer ===
- Guddiyan Patole (2019)

== Discography ==
=== Studio albums ===
List of albums
Year	Album	Record Label	Music
2011	Chandigarh Diyan Kudian	Speed Records	Bhinda Auijla
2013	Jattizm	Lokdhun Punjabi	Gupz Sehra
2023	Layers	Panj Paani Music	Jaymeet, Dilmaan, Black Virus
2025	Rise & Thrive	White Hill Music	

=== Singles ===
List of singles
Year	Song	Lyrics	Music	Label	Note(s)
2013	Ikk Pal	Lavi Nagpal	Gupz Sehra	Mv Records	From his album Jattizm
2014	Bullet vs Chammak Challo	Lalli Saggo	Gupz Sehra	Mv Records	From his album Jattizm
2015	Zindabaad Yaarian	Maninder Turke	Gupz Sehra	Mv Records	
2015	Taara	Jaani	B Praak	Sony Music India	
2016	Haan Kargi	Amrit Maan	Gupz Sehra	Mv Records	
2016	Surma To Sandals	Jaani	B Praak	T-Series	Featuring B Praak
2016	Hassian Khedian	Balli Baljit	Mr.Wow	Speed Records	
2017	Akh Teri Baaz Wargi	Tarseem Jassar	R Guru	White Hill Music	
2017	Qismat	Jaani	B Praak	Speed Records	Featuring Sargun Mehta
2017	"Skid"		Desi Dark Child	Coffin Studios	
2018	Hath Chumme	Jaani	B Praak	Desi Melodies	Featuring B Praak
2018	Double Cross	Happy Raikoti	Ikwinder Singh (ikky)	Speed Records	
2018	Background	Babbu	Mix Singh	Speed Records	
2019	Mitraa	Simar Doraha	Jatinder Shah	Speed Records	
2019	Wang Da Naap	Harmanjeet	Gurmeet Singh	White Hill Music	Promotional Track from "Muklawa"
2019	Haaye Ve	Raj Fatehpur	Sunny Vi	I Just Music	Produced By Jacky Bhagnani
2020	Tod Da-e-Dil	Maninder Buttar	Avvy Sra	Desi Melodies	
2020	Main Suneya	Raj Fatehpur	Sunny Vik	T-Series	
2020	Regret	Simar Doraha	Goldboy	Speed Records	
2020	Taare Baliye	Happy Raikoti	Avvy Sra	Burfi Music	Debut as Producer; Featuring Sargun Mehta
2021	Khabbi Seat	Happy Raikoti	Mix Singh	Burfi Music	Featuring Sweetaj Brar and has passed 100M+ views on YouTube.
2021	Kade Kade	Happy Raikoti	Avvy Sra	T-Series	Featuring Wamiqa Gabbi
2021	Pyaar Di Kahani	Raj Fatehpur	Sunny Vik	Saregama	
2021	Dabde Ni	Mani Longia	Starboy Music X	Burfi Music	
2022	Teri Jatti	Mani Longia	Sync	Burfi Music	Featuring Tania
2024	Sache Patshah	Nawab Khan	Jaskirat Singh	Purab Mubarak	Video by Baljit Singh Deo
2024	Lipstick Bindiyan		Jatinder Shah		Add By Ghaffar

=== As featured artist ===
Year	Title	Singer	Lyrics	Record label	Ref
2022	Behja Behja	The Landers	Mani Longia	Burfi Music	

=== Film soundtrack ===
==== Punjabi ====
Year	Song	Film
2015	Tappe	Angrej
2016	Kawa Wali Panchait	Ardaas
2016	Nain	Ardaas
2016	Badla Lena	Dulla Bhatti
2016	Kainthe Wala	Bambukat
2016	Rakhi Soneya Ve	Bambukat
2016	Bambukat	Bambukat
2016	Mini Cooper	Nikka Zaildar
2016	Lagdi Na Akh	Nikka Zaildar
2017	Record Bolde	Jugni Hath Kise Na Auni
2017	Akh Boldi	Rabb Da Radio
2017	Kali Jotta	Nikka Zaildar 2
2017	Gaani	Nikka Zaildar 2
2017	Vekh Ke Hasdi	Manje Bistre
2017	Sindhoori	Bailaras
2017	Jatt Da Kalej	Sat Shri Akaal England
2018	Radio	Laung Laachi
2018	Akhiyaan Naar Diyan	Laung Laachi
2018	Pasand Jatt Di	Qismat
2018	Gallan Teriyan	Qismat
2020	Jaan Deyan Ge	Sufna
2021	Aaye Haye Jattiye	Puaada
2021	Teri Akhiyan	Qismat 2
2022	Sirnawa	Bajre Da Sitta

==== Hindi ====
Year	Song	Film	Composer(s)	Lyrics	Co-singer(s)
2018	"Daryaa"	Manmarziyaan	Amit Trivedi	Shellee	Shahid Mallya
2024	"Qismat Badal Di"	Yodha	B Praak, Aditya Dev	Jaani	B Praak
2024	"Haule Sajna"	Bad Newz	Rochak Kohli	Gurpreet Saini, Gautam G Sharma	Solo

== Awards and nominations ==
Year	Film	Award ceremony	Category	Result	Ref.
2016	Angrej	PTC Punjabi Film Awards	Best Debut Actor	Won	
2017	Bambukat	PTC Punjabi Film Awards	Best Playback Singer (male)	Nominated	
2017	Bambukat	PTC Punjabi Film Awards	Best Actor	Won(shared with Amrinder Gill)	
2017	Bambukat	Filmfare Awards Punjabi	Best Actor (critics)	Won	
2017	Bambukat	Filmfare Awards Punjabi	Best Actor	Nominated	
2017	Nikka Zaildar	Filmfare Awards Punjabi	Best Playback Singer (male)	Nominated	
2018	Nikka Zaildar 2	PTC Punjabi Film Awards	Best Playback Singer (male)	Won	
2018	Nikka Zaildar 2	PTC Punjabi Film Awards	Best Actor	Nominated	
2018	Nikka Zaildar 2	Filmfare Awards Punjabi	Best Actor	Nominated	
2018	Nikka Zaildar 2	Filmfare Awards Punjabi	Best Playback Singer (male)	Nominated	
2018	Nikka Zaildar 2	Brit Asia Film Awards	Best Actor	Nominated	
2018	Nikka Zaildar 2	Brit Asia Film Awards	Best Playback Singer (male)	Nominated	
2019	Manmarziyaan	25th Screen Awards	Screen Award for Best Male Playback	Nominated	
2019	Manmarziyaan	FC Film Club Awards	Best Song "Daryaa"	Won	
2019	Manmarziyaan	Reel Movie Awards	Best Playback Singer (Male)	Won	
2019	Qismat	Brit Asia TV Awards	Best Male Playback Vocalist	Nominated	
2019	Qismat	Brit Asia TV Awards	Best Actor	Nominated	
2019	Laung Laachi	Brit Asia TV Awards	Best Supporting Actor	Nominated	
2019	Laung Laachi	PTC Punjabi Film Awards	Best Supporting Actor	Nominated	
2019	Harjeeta	PTC Punjabi Film Awards	Best Actor	Nominated	
2019	Harjeeta	PTC Punjabi Film Awards	Best Playback Singer (Male)	Nominated	
2021	83	FOI Online Awards	Best Performance by an Ensemble Cast	Nominated	
