= Son of Manjeet Singh =

- Theatrical release poster
- Directed by: Vikram Grover
- Screenplay by: Dheeraj Rattan; Surmeet Maavi
- Story by: Mahesh Manjrekar
- Based on: Shikshanachya Aaicha Gho
- Produced by: Kapil Sharma; Sumeet Singh
- Starring: Gurpreet Ghuggi; B.N. Sharma; Karamjit Anmol; Japji Khaira; Tania
- Cinematography: Vineet Malhotra
- Edited by: Ajay Sharma
- Music by: Surender Sodhi; Darshan Umang
- Production companies: K9 Films; Seven Color Motion Pictures
- Release date: 12 October 2018 (India)
- Country: India
- Language: Punjabi

Son of Manjeet Singh is a 2018 Indian-Punjabi film directed by Vikram Grover. The film is co-produced by K9 Films and Seven Color Motion Pictures and stars Gurpreet Ghuggi, Karamjit Anmol, Japji Khaira, B.N. Sharma, Harby Sangha and Malkit Rouni in pivotal roles. It is a remake of 2010 Marathi film Shikshanachya Aaicha Gho!.

The film is produced by comedian Kapil Sharma and Sumeet Singh and was released on 12 October 2018.

== Plot ==
An undefined relationship between father and son of love and dreams goes beyond all boundaries of struggles to meet the demand of generation gap.

== Cast ==
- Gurpreet Ghuggi as Manjeet Singh
- B.N. Sharma as B.N. Baggha
- Karamjit Anmol
- Japji Khaira as Preeti
- Harby Sangha
- Malkeet Rauni
- Deep Mandeep
- Tania as Simran
- Damanpreet Singh as Jayveer Singh(Manjeet Singh's Son)

== Reception ==
Jaspreet Nijher of The Times of India gave 3.5 stars out of 5. Manjit Singh of Santa Banta also gave 3.5 stars out of 5. Sangeet Toor of Film Companion gave 3.0 out of 5.
