= Qismat 2 =

2021 Indian romantic drama film

- Film poster
- Directed by: Jagdeep Sidhu
- Written by: Jagdeep Sidhu
- Produced by: Ankit Vijan; Navdeep Narula; Kiran Yadav
- Starring: Ammy Virk; Sargun Mehta
- Cinematography: Navneet Misser
- Edited by: Manish More
- Music by: B Praak
- Production companies: Shri Narotam Ji Production; Zee Studios
- Distributed by: Zee Studios
- Release date: 23 September 2021
- Running time: 154 minutes
- Country: India
- Language: Punjabi

Qismat 2 (transl. Destiny 2) is a 2021 Indian Punjabi-language romantic drama film written and directed by Jagdeep Sidhu. The film produced by Ankit Vijan and Navdeep Narula has been bankrolled by Shri Narotam Ji Productions and Zee Studios. Starring Ammy Virk and Sargun Mehta, the film is a sequel of 2018 film Qismat.

Principal photography of the film began on 17 October 2020, with a muhurat shot. The film was released theatrically on 23 September 2021.

== Cast ==
Cast of Qismat 2:

- Ammy Virk as Shivjit Singh
- Sargun Mehta as Bani Kaur
- Tania as Majaz Kaur
- Rupinder Rupi as Kabil's mother
- Satwant Kaur as Bani's mother
- Jaani as Kabil Singh, Bani's husband

== Production ==
The film was conceived after the success of Qismat. In an interview director Jagdeep Sidhu told that film team was working on to bring another film as good as last one. This team including Ammy Virk, Sargun Mehta, Jagdeep Sidhu, Jaani and B Praak is planning a sequel. Mehta shared a post on Instagram that Qismat 2 is on the way. In May 2019, Sidhu confirmed the sequel with same crew. In July 2019, Virk also confirmed the film on his official social media handles. On 11 September 2019, Sidhu released the title poster of Qismat 2 with the release date as 18 September 2020. The script was ready by first week of July 2020. Due to COVID-19 pandemic the shooting of the sequel was delayed. Finally the filming began on 17 October 2020.

== Soundtrack ==
Qismat 2

Soundtrack album by B Praak
- Released: 2021
- Genre: Feature film soundtrack
- Length: 25:46
- Language: Punjabi
- Label: Tips Punjabi

B Praak chronology
Sufna (2020)	Qismat 2 (2021)	Lekh (2022)
External media
Audio
- ISL4_ Title track on JioSaavn
- Paagla on JioSaavn
Video
- Title track on YouTube

Soundtrack of Qismat 2 is composed by B Praak, lyrics by Jaani and the songs are sung by B Praak, Nooran Sisters, Afsana Khan, Ammy Virk, Asees Kaur and Romy. The soundtrack is released on Tips Punjabi. In Song "Mere Yaara Ve", Avvy Sra served as Music Composer. The songs "Qismat 2- Title track", "Teri Akhiyaan", "Kis Morh Te" were composed by Jaani while songs "Janam", "Paagla" were composed by B Praak.

The title track Sung by B Praak was released on 24 August. Second track of the film, "Janam" was released on 2 September 2021, sung by Romy. Third Track of the film "Teri Akhiyaan" sung by Ammy Virk and Afsana Khan was released on 8 September 2021. Fourth track of the film "Kis Morh Te" was released on 18 September. "Mere Yaara Ve", the fifth song was released on 22 September. The last track of the film "Paagla" sung by B Praak and Asees Kaur was released after the film release, on 9 October 2021.

=== Track list of Qismat 2 ===
No.	Title	Singer(s)	Length
1.	"Qismat 2 - Title track"	B Praak	4:59
2.	"Janam"	Romy	3:52
3.	"Teri Akheeyan"	Ammy Virk & Afsana Khan	2:41
4.	"Kis Morh Te"	B Praak & Jyoti Nooran	5:25
5.	"Mere Yaara Ve"	B Praak	4:24
6.	"Paagla"	B Praak & Asees Kaur	4:25
Total length:			25:46

== Release ==
The film was released theatrically on 23 September 2021.

=== Home media ===
Qismat 2 was released for streaming on Over-the-top media service platform ZEE5 on 29 October 2021.

== Reception ==
Bobby Sing of The Free Press Journal rated the film with 3 stars out of 5 and wrote, "Overall, Qismat 2, directed by Jagdeep Sidhu, can easily be called a nice, musical, emotionally moving, family entertainment package carefully conceived by the team."

=== Box office ===
Qismat 2 opened with gross collection of ₹2.07 crore worldwide on first day of release.

== Sequel ==
Qismat 3, the third part of the film series is in development.
