= Pankaj Batra =

Indian Punjabi-language film director

- Born: Chandigarh, India
- Occupations: Film director, Producer
- Years active: 2004–present
- Website: iampankajbatra.com

Pankaj Batra is an Indian film director. He is known for Sajjan Singh Rangroot Starring (Diljit Dosanjh),Bambukat Starring (Ammy Virk),Goreyan Nu Daffa Karo Starring (Amrinder Gill), Naughty Jatts, and Dildariyaan.

In 2017, he released his film Channa Mereya (film) starring Ninja, Payal Rajput, Amrit Maan, Karamjit Anmol.

== Career ==
His first Punjabi film as director was Reehjan in November 2005, starring Ranjeet, Aryan Vaid, and Bunti Garewal. After that he directed a soap titled Chaldi Da Naam Gaddi for Zee television in November 2007. Later on, he directed another show in 2008 titled Hum Tum for Zee. His second Punjabi feature film was Virsa in 2008 starring Gulshan Grover and Aryan Babbar.

Pankaj Batra's first hit as director was Naughty Jatts, released in 2013, starring Neeru Bajwa, Binnu Dhillon and Aarya Babbar. His next film Goreyan Nu Daffa Karo was hit in 2014 starring Amrinder Gill, Binnu Dhillon, Amrit Manghera. His third titled "Dildariyaan" with Jassi Gill was his connective hit in 2015.

"Bambukat" grossed Rs.1.38 crore in Punjab on its first day. It was released in over 65 screens in key international markets on 29 July and grossed approximately US$1 million at the overseas box office in the first week.

Sajjan Singh Rangroot is eighth highest Punjabi grossing film of all time and second highest-grossing film of 2018.

His next is with super star Jassi Gill, Ranjit Bawa and Ninja, titled High End Yaariyan, which is scheduled for 22 February 2019 release.

== Director ==
- Reejhan (2005)
- Virsa (2010)
- Naughty Jatts (2013)
- Goreyan Nu Daffa Karo (2014)
- Dildariyaan (2015)
- Channo Kamli Yaar Di (2016)
- Bambukat (2016)
- Channa Mereya (2017)
- Sajjan Singh Rangroot (2018)
- High End Yaariyan (2019)
- Jinde Meriye (2020)
- Mitran Da Naa Chalda (2023)

Also producer

- Mitran Da Naa Chalda (2023)

== Awards ==
- Best Director - Bambukat - Filmfare Awards Punjabi
- Best Sound Design - Winners of the Jio Filmfare Awards Punjabi 2017

== Nominations ==
- 2017 - Best Director Filmafare Aware (Punjabi) for the Film Bambukat
