= Laatu =

Film

- Theatrical release poster
- Directed by: Manav Shah
- Screenplay by: Dheeraj Rattan
- Produced by: Jagmeet Singh
- Starring: Gagan Kokri; Aditi Sharma; Anita Devgan; Sardar Sohi; Karamjit Anmol; Ashish Duggal; Hardeep Gill; Harby Sangha
- Cinematography: Akashdeep Pandey
- Edited by: Rohit Dhiman
- Music by: Jatinder Shah
- Production companies: Farid Entertainment; New Era Movies
- Release date: 16 November 2018 (India)
- Country: India
- Language: Punjabi

Laatu (transl. light bulb) is an Indian-Punjabi-language period drama film directed by Manav Shah and co-produced by Farid Entertainment and New Era Movies. The film stars Gagan Kokri, Aditi Sharma, Anita Devgn, Sardar Sohi, Hardeep Gill and Karamjit Anmol in pivotal roles. The film was released on 16 November 2018 in India. The film was the debut for singer Gagan Kokri as an actor.

== Cast ==
- Gagan Kokri
- Aditi Sharma
- Karamjit Anmol
- Anita Devgan
- Sardar Sohi
- Ashish Duggal
- Hardeep Gill
- Harby Sangha
- Rahul Jungral
- Nisha Bano
- Prince Kanwaljit Singh
- Parkash Gadhu
- Malkit Rauni
