= Parahuna =

- Theatrical release poster
- Directed by: Amrit Raj Chadha; Mohit Banwait
- Written by: Sukhraj singh
- Screenplay by: Sukhraj Singh
- Story by: sukhraj singh
- Produced by: Mohit Banwait; Mani Dhaliwal
- Starring: Kulwinder Billa; Wamiqa Gabbi; Karamjit Anmol; Nirmal Rishi; Sardar Sohi
- Cinematography: Neetu Iqbal Singh
- Edited by: Bunty Nagi
- Music by: Mr. Wow; Music Nasha; The Boss
- Production companies: Dara Film Productions; Banwait Films; Seven Color Motion Picture
- Release date: 28 September 2018 (India)
- Country: India
- Language: Punjabi

Parahuna (transl. Guest) is an Indian Punjabi language comedy film directed by Amrit Raj Chadha and Mohit Banwait. The film stars Kulwinder Billa and Wamiqa Gabbi in lead roles while Karamjit Anmol, Harby Sangha, Sardar Sohi, Hobby Dhaliwal, Malkit Rouni and many others are in the supporting roles. The film was released on 28 September 2018.

Parahuna 2, a sequel directed by Ksshitij Chaudhary and starring Ranjit Bawa and Aditi Sharma was scheduled to release in 2022 but was delayed.

== Plot ==
Janta is obsessed with the 1980s Punjabi film actress Preeti Sapru and he dreams of marrying a woman who looks just like his screen idol. A friend in the village tells Janta that his sister-in-law bears an uncanny resemblance to Preeti Sapru. Emboldened by this exciting news, Janta accompanies his friend to a wedding where he intends to woo the beautiful doppelganger. In his pursuit of a seemingly perfect woman, Janta helps others to solve their romantic woes.

== Cast ==
- Kulwinder Billa as Janta
- Wamiqa Gabbi as Maano
- Karamjit Anmol
- Harby Sangha
- Sardar Sohi
- Hobby Dhaliwal
- Anita Meet
- Malkit Rouni
- Nirmal Rishi
- Rupinder Rupi
- Gurpreet Bhangu
- Parkash Gadu
- Raj Dhaliwal
- Akshita
- Navdeep Kaler
- Tarsem Paul
- Aman Sidhu

== Reception ==
The film opened good as shows of the film remained top at different sites.

The film received fair reviews from critic reviewers. Jasmine Singh of The Tribune gave just 1 star to the film out of 5. The reviewer criticised the film, saying, "Anything in excess is not good. Even love overdose can be lethal! And overdose of tradition and culture on Punjabi cinema leads to a film, Parahuna, which is this week's Punjabi film release."
