= Jagdeep Sidhu =

Indian film director and writer

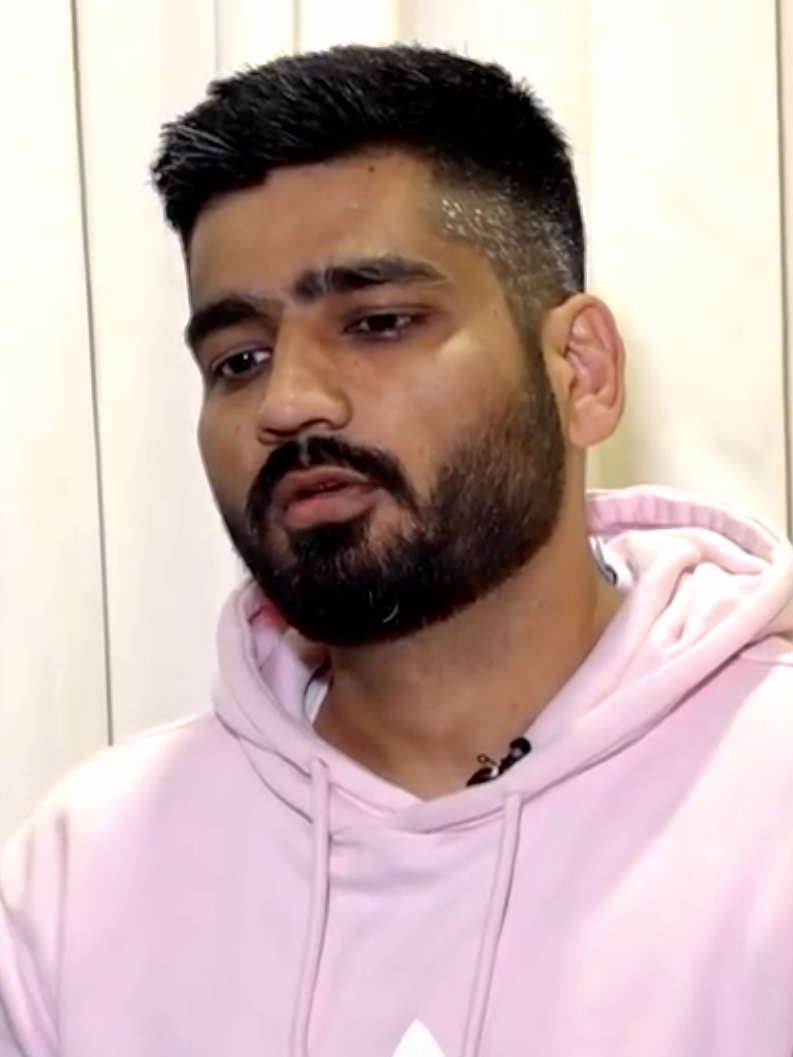
- Jagdeep Sidhu in 2019
- Born: 2 January 1983
- Occupations: Director; writer; screenplay writer; dialogue writer
- Years active: 2014–present
- Notable work: Nikka Zaildar; Qismat; Surkhi Bindi; Sufna; Qismat 2 Lekh; Moh

Jagdeep Sidhu is an Indian film director, writer, screenwriter and dialogue writer associated with Punjabi and Hindi cinema. He has been nominated for seven awards for categories "Best Screenplay", "Dialogue", and "Direction" PTC Punjabi Film Awards, winning one "Best Debut Director" for the film Qismat (2019) and has been nominated for five Filmfare Awards Punjabi.

== Filmography ==
Key
†	Denotes films that have not yet been released

Year	Film	Director	Story	Screenplay	Dialogues	Notes
2013	Jal	—N/a	—N/a	—N/a	Additional	
2013	Ronde Sare Vyah Picho	—N/a	—N/a	—N/a	Yes	Uncredited
2013	Just U & Me	—N/a	—N/a	—N/a	Yes	
2014	Proper Patola	—N/a	—N/a	—N/a	Additional	Co-Additional Dialogue Writer with Jyoti Vyas
2015	Punjabian Da King	—N/a	—N/a	Yes	Yes	
2015	Dildariyaan	—N/a	Yes	Yes	Yes	
2016	Nikka Zaildar	—N/a	Yes	Yes	Yes	Nominated for Best Screenplay and Best Dialogue Award in PTC Punjabi Film Awards and Filmfare Awards Punjabi
2017	Sargi	—N/a	Yes	Yes	Yes	
2017	Super Singh	—N/a	No	No	Yes	Co-Dialogue Writer with Rupinder Inderjit and Anurag Singh
2017	Nikka Zaildar 2	—N/a	Yes	Yes	Yes	Nominated for Best Screenplay and Best Dialogue Awards at Filmfare Punjabi Awards
2018	Harjeeta	—N/a	Yes	Yes	Yes	
2018	Qismat	Yes	Yes	Yes	Yes	Won Best Debut Director Award at PFA
2019	Guddiyan Patole	No	Yes	Yes	Yes	Co-Dialogue Writer with Deep Jagdeep Jaedy
2019	Shadaa	Yes	Yes	Yes	Yes	
2019	Surkhi Bindi	Yes	No	No	No	
2019	Nikka Zaildar 3	No	Yes	Yes	Yes	Co-Writer (Story, Screenplay & Dialogues) with Gurpreet Singh Palheri
2019	Saand Ki Aankh	No	No	No	Yes	
2020	Street Dancer	No	No	Additional	Additional	
2020	Sufna	Yes	Yes	Yes	Yes	
2021	Qismat 2	Yes	Yes	Yes	Yes	
2022	Lekh	No	No	Yes	Yes	
2022	Sher Bagga	Yes	Yes	Yes	Yes	
2022	Moh	Yes	No	Yes	Yes	Co-Screenwriter and Co-Dialogue Writer with Shiv Tarsem Singh and Govind Singh
2024	Srikanth	No	No	No	Yes	Co-Dialogue Writer with Sumit Purohit
2024	Jatt & Juliet 3	Yes	Yes	—N/a	—N/a	

== Awards and nominations ==
Year	Film	Award Ceremony	Category	Result
2017	Nikka Zaildar	PTC Punjabi Film Awards	Best Screenplay	Nominated
2017	Nikka Zaildar	PTC Punjabi Film Awards	Best Dialogues	Nominated
2017	Nikka Zaildar	Filmfare Awards	Best Screenplay	Nominated
2017	Nikka Zaildar	Filmfare Awards	Best Dialogues	Nominated
2017	Nikka Zaildar	Filmfare Awards	Best Original Story	Nominated
2018	Nikka Zaildar 2	Filmfare Awards	Best Screenplay	Nominated
2018	Nikka Zaildar 2	Filmfare Awards	Best Dialogues	Nominated
2019	Qismat	PTC Punjabi Film Awards	Best Director	Nominated
2019	Qismat	PTC Punjabi Film Awards	Best Debut Director	Won
2019	Qismat	PTC Punjabi Film Awards	Best Screenplay	Nominated
2019	Qismat	PTC Punjabi Film Awards	Best Story	Nominated
2019	Qismat	PTC Punjabi Film Awards	Best Dialogues	Nominated
2019	Qismat	Brit Asia TV Awards	Best Director	Nominated
2020	Shadaa	PTC Punjabi Film Awards	Best Comedy Film	Nominated
2020	Shadaa	PTC Punjabi Film Awards	Best Entertainer	Won
