= List of Punjabi films of 2025 =

This is a list of Indian Punjabi cinema films to be released/scheduled in 2025

List of punjabi filma of 2026 punjabi movies

== Box office collection ==
The following is the list of highest-grossing Punjabi cinema films released till date in 2025. The rank of the films in the following table depends on the estimate of worldwide collections as reported by organizations classified as green by Wikipedia. (Note: See WP:RSP, WP:ICTFSOURCES) There is no official tracking of domestic box office figures within India.

Highest-grossing films of 2025
Rank	Title	Production company	Worldwide gross	Ref.
1	Sardaar Ji 3	White Hill Studios	₹70.10 crore (US$7.3 million)	
2	Guru Nanak Jahaz	Vehli Janta Films	₹36.46 crore (US$3.8 million)	
3	Akaal: The Unconquered	Humble Motion Pictures and Dharma Productions	₹25 crore (US$2.6 million)	
4	Saunkan Saunkanay 2	Dreamiyata Entertainment and Naad SStudios	₹16.71 crore (US$1.7 million)	
5	Shaunki Sardar	Zee Studios and Boss musica	₹3.56 crore (US$370,000)	
6	Mithde	Amberdeep Productions	₹2.23 crore (US$230,000)	
7	Six Each	Hardeep Grewal Productions and Wanton Productions	₹1.76 crore (US$180,000)	
8	Majhail	Geet Mp3	₹1.74 crore (US$180,000)	
9	Gangland	Geet Mp3	₹1.24 crore (US$130,000)	
10	Illti	Jagjeet Sandhu Films	₹1.03 crore (US$110,000)	

== January–July ==
Releasing		Title	Director	Main Cast	Ref.
J A N U A R Y	3	Mithiye	Harjeet Jassal	Jasmine Barnala, Mandy Bhullar and Sonu Broca	
J A N U A R Y	5	Pyaar Taan Hai Na	Arvinder Kaur	Shama Bhangu, Manu Brar and Chriesty Gandhi	
J A N U A R Y	7	Hasrat (An Uncommon Love Story)	Vishaw Suneja	Shahnaz Ali, Arvinder Bhatti, and Satnam Bijliwal	
J A N U A R Y	17	Akkad Bakkad Bambee Bo Assi Nabbe Poore So	Royal Singh	Vikram Chouhan, Prabh Grewal, Sanju Solanki, Gurpreet Bhangu, Rupi Barnala, Amar Noori	
J A N U A R Y	23	Sauda Khara Khara	Alam Gahir	Kadir Thind, Sehar, Ashish Duggal, Gurpreet Bhangu, Gurinder Makna, Bhotu Shah, Gurchet Chitarkar	
J A N U A R Y	24	Gurmukh: The Eyewitness	Pali Bhupinder Singh	Kuljinder Sidhu, Sara Gurpal, Sardar Sohi, and Yaad Grewal	
J A N U A R Y	31	Majhail	Dheeraj Rattan	Dev Kharoud, Roopi Gill, and Guggu Gill	
F E B R U A R Y	7	Hoshiar Singh: Apna Arastu	Uday Pratap Singh	Satinder Sartaaj and Simi Chahal	
F E B R U A R Y	14	Illti	Varinder Ramgarhia	Jagjeet Sandhu, Tania	
F E B R U A R Y	28	Badnaam	Maneesh Bhatt	Jayy Randhawa, Jasmine Bhasin	
M A R C H	4	Jarnail (the warrior)	Karan Lorry	Sardar Sohi, Dilnoor Kaur, Vikram Chouhan, and Rajeinder Kaur Reet	
M A R C H	7	Nikka Zaildar 4	Simerjit Singh	Ammy Virk and Sonam Bajwa	
M A R C H	14	Mithde	Amberdeep Singh	Tania, Roopi Gill, and Laksh Duleh	
M A R C H	14	Six Each	Garry Khatrao	Hardeep Grewal, Mandy Takhar, Malkeet Rauni	
M A R C H	28	Tenu Ghodi Kinney Chadaya	Royal Singh	Harby Sangha and Raavi Kaur Bal	
A P R I L	4	Jaggo Aayi Aa	Sunny Binning	Guggu Gill, Poonam Dhillon, Sardar Sohi, Sukhwinder Raj, and Ravneet Kaur	
A P R I L	10	Akaal: The Unconquered	Gippy Grewal	Gippy Grewal, Nimrat Khaira, Gurpreet Ghuggi, Prince Kanwaljit Singh	
A P R I L	22	Kadi ta Has Bol Ve	Satinder Singh Dev	Rajiv Thakur and Irwinmeet Kaur	
A P R I L	25	Gangland: The City of Crime	Savio Sandhu	Nishawn Bhullar, Amiek Virk, Sippy Gill, and Dheeraj Kumar	
M A Y	1	Guru Nanak Jahaz	Sharan Art	Tarsem Jassar, Gurpreet Ghuggi, Edward Sonnenblick	
M A Y	11	Karinde: the Weapons	Sharanjit Bassi	Satveer Toor, Yuvraj Singh, Onika Maan, Jai Dhaliwal	
M A Y	16	Shaunki Sardar	Dheeraj Rattan	Babbu Maan, Guru Randhawa, Guggu Gill, and Nimrit Kaur Ahluwalia	
M A Y	16	Enna Nu Rehna Sehna Ni Aaunda	Rupan Bal	Sapna Pabbi, Imran Ashraf, Nirmal Rishi	
M A Y	30	Saunkan Saunkanay 2	Smeep Kang	Ammy Virk, Sargun Mehta, and Nimrat Khaira	
J U N E	13	Dakuaan Da Munda 3	Happy Rode	Dev Kharoud. Japji Khaira, Raj Singh Jhinjar. Balwinder Bullet	
J U N E	13	Jombieland	Deepak Thaper	Angira Dhar, Kanika Mann, Binnu Dhillon, Gurpreet Bhangu	
J U N E	13	Mukk Gyi Feem Dabbi Cho Yaaro	Gaurav Rana	Dheeraj Kumar and Mahesh Manjrekar	
J U N E	13	Raunak	Jass Grewal	Jassi Jaspreet, Malkeet Rauni	
J U N E	27	Sardaar Ji 3	Rohit Jugraj	Diljit Dosanjh, Neeru Bajwa, and Gulshan Grover	
J U L Y	18	Sarbala Ji	Mandeep Kumar	Gippy Grewal, Ammy Virk, Sargun Mehta, and Nimrat Khaira	

== August–December ==
Releasing		Title	Director	Main Cast	Ref.
A U G U S T	1	Chal Mera Putt 4	Rakesh Dhawan	Amrinder Gill, Simi Chahal	
A U G U S T	22	Phaphey Kuttniyan	Jagdeep Sidhu	Neeru Bajwa, Tania	
S E P T E M B E R	12	Punjabi Aa Gaye Oye	Aditya Sood	Prince Kanwaljit Singh, Singga, Twinkle Arora	
S E P T E M B E R	20	Sucha Soorma	Amitoj Maan		

== See also ==
- List of Punjabi films
- List of Punjabi films of 2024
