= List of Punjabi films of 2024 =

This is a list of Indian Punjabi cinema films to be released/scheduled in 2024

== Box office collection ==
The following is the list of highest-grossing Punjabi cinema films released in 2024. The rank of the films in the following table depends on the estimate of worldwide collections as reported by organizations classified as green by Wikipedia. (Note: See WP:RSP, WP:ICTFSOURCES) There is no official tracking of domestic box office figures within India.

Background shading indicates that a film is currently showing in theatres worldwide.

Highest-grossing films of 2024
Rank	Title	Production company	Worldwide gross	Ref.
1	Jatt & Juliet 3	White Hill Studios Speed Records	₹101 crore (US$10 million)	
2	Shinda Shinda No Papa	Yoodlee Film, Humble Motion Pictures	₹15.7 crore (US$1.6 million)	
3	Jatt Nuu Chudail Takri	Dreamiyata, Desi Melodies	₹10.79 crore (US$1.1 million)	
4	Warning 2	Humble Motion Pictures	₹5.25 crore (US$550,000)	
5	Jee Ve Sohneya Jee	VH Entertainment, U&I Films	₹2.47 crore (US$260,000)	
6	Shayar	Neeru Bajwa Entertainment	₹2.04 crore (US$210,000)	
7	Ni Main Sass Kuttni 2	Saregama, Banwait Films	₹2.03 crore (US$210,000)	
8	Shahkot	Aim7Sky Studio	₹1.58 crore (US$160,000)	
9	Khadari	GFM & Ravishing Entertainment	₹1.19 crore (US$120,000)	
10	Lambran Da Laana	Fire Monika Multi Media	₹31 lakh (US$32,000)	

== January–July ==
Opening		Title	Director	Cast	Ref.
J A N U A R Y	26	Lambran Da Laana	Taj	Babbal Rai, Sara Gurpal	
F E B R U A R Y	2	Warning 2	Amar Hundal	Gippy Grewal, Jasmin Bhasin, Prince Kanwaljit Singh	
F E B R U A R Y	2	Shayar	Uday Pratap Singh	Neeru Bajwa, Satinder Sartaaj	
F E B R U A R Y	9	Khadari	Manav Shah	Gurnam Bhullar, Surbhi Jyoti, Kartar Cheema	
F E B R U A R Y	16	Jee Ve Sohneya Jee	Thaparr	Imran Abbas, Simi Chahal, Mintu Kapa	
F E B R U A R Y	16	Oye Bhole Oye	Varinder Ramgarhia	Jagjeet Sandhu, Irwinmeet Kaur	
M A R C H	1	Ni Main Sass Kuttni 2	Mohit Banwait	Anita Devgan, Gurpreet Ghuggi, Karamjit Anmol	
M A R C H	15	Jatt Nuu Chudail Takri	Vikas Vashisht	Gippy Grewal, Sargun Mehta	
A P R I L	5	Chal Bhajj Chaliye	Sunil Thakur	Inder Chahal, Rubina Dilaik, Alisha	
M A Y	10	Shinda Shinda No Papa	Amarpreet Chabra	Gippy Grewal, Shinda Grewal, Hina Khan	
J U N E	27	Jatt & Juliet 3	Jagdeep Sidhu	Diljit Dosanjh, Neeru Bajwa, Jasmin Bajwa	
J U L Y	26	Manje Bistre 3	Baljit Singh Deo	Gippy Grewal, Gurpreet Ghuggi, Karamjit Anmol	

== August–December ==
Opening		Title	Director	Cast	Ref.
O C T	4	Shahkot	Rajiv Dhingra	Guru Randhawa, Isha Talwar	

== See also ==
- List of Punjabi films of 2023
- List of Punjabi films of 2025
