= Oye Bhole Oye 2 =

Upcoming Indian Punjabi-language film

- Directed by: Jagjeet Sandhu
- Written by: Gurpreet Bhullar
- Produced by: KV Dhillon; Jagjeet Sandhu
- Starring: Jagjeet Sandhu; Dheeraj Kumar; Soumyaa; Parkash Gadhu; Amrit Amby; Rupinder Rupi
- Production companies: Geet MP3; Jagjeet Sandhu Films
- Distributed by: Geet MP3
- Release date: 12 June 2026
- Country: India
- Language: Punjabi

Oye Bhole Oye 2 is an Indian Punjabi-language drama film directed by Jagjeet Sandhu and written by Gurpreet Bhullar. Produced by KV Dhillon and Jagjeet Sandhu under the banners of Geet MP3 and Jagjeet Sandhu Films, the film serves as a sequel to the 2024 film Oye Bhole Oye.

The film stars Jagjeet Sandhu, Dheeraj Kumar, Soumyaa, Parkash Gadhu, Amrit Amby and Rupinder Rupi. It is scheduled to be theatrically released on 12 June 2026.

== Premise ==
A simple village man refuses to sell his ancestral land despite pressure from a powerful company and opposition from his own family. As he stands firm, his resistance develops into a larger struggle to protect his roots and expose the truth behind the project.

== Cast ==
- Jagjeet Sandhu as Bhola
- Dheeraj Kumar
- Soumyaa
- Parkash Gadhu
- Amrit Amby
- Rupinder Rupi
- Pardeep Cheema
- Jarnail Singh
- Mad Sandhu (guest appearance)

== Production ==
Following the positive response of Oye Bhole Oye, producers KV Dhillon and Jagjeet Sandhu announced the sequel. Sandhu reprises his role as Bhola, while Gurpreet Bhullar returned as the writer for the sequel.

== Filming ==
Principal photography began in Punjab, with the majority of the film shot in and around Mohali and additional sequences were filmed in various villages across the state during different stages of production. Principal photography concluded in early 2026.

== Release ==
The official trailer of the film was released in May 2026. The film is scheduled to be released theatrically in India on 12 June 2026.

== Soundtrack ==
The soundtrack of Oye Bhole Oye 2 features Punjabi-language songs released by Geet MP3.

Title	Singer(s)	Lyrics by	Music by
Flow	Sultaan	Kang Sadiq	Crowny
Sidha Jatt	Sajjan Adeeb	Gurjit Gill	Black Virus
Nasha Patta	Veet Baljit, Praveen Bharta and Jagjeet Sandhu	Veet Baljit	Magic
Ma Zameen	Kanwar Grewal	Kang Sadiq	Oye Kunaal
