= Majhail (film) =

Indian action film

- Directed by: Dheeraj Kedarnath Rattan
- Written by: Dheeraj Kedarnath Rattan and Manila Rattan
- Produced by: KV Dhillon
- Starring: Dev Kharoud; Roopi Gill; Guggu Gill; Kul Sidhu
- Release date: 31 January 2025
- Country: India
- Language: Punjabi

Majhail is a Punjabi-language action film directed by Dheeraj Kedarnath Rattan. The film is written by Dheeraj Kedarnath Rattan and Manila Rattan. It stars Dev Kharoud and Roopi Gill in lead roles and Guggu Gill, Dheeraj Kumar, Vadda Grewal, and Hobby Dhaliwal in supporting roles. The film released in theatres on 31 January 2025.

It revolves around a fierce and gritty power struggle between rival criminal families in rural Punjab, which is disrupted by a strict, new police commander. The film follows themes of loyalty, revenge, and the violent consequences of political ambition.

== Cast ==
- Dev Kharoud
- Roopi Gill
- Guggu Gill
- Dheeraj Kumar
- Vadda Grewal
- Kul Sidhu
- Hobby Dhaliwal
- Sanjeev Attri

== Filming ==
The film was filmed at multiple locations across Punjab, including Nabha, Mohali, Kurali, Morinda, and Nandpur Kalaur. Principal photography for the film commenced on 14 May 2024 and concluded in September 2024.

== Reception ==
Majhail received a favourable review from ‘‘The Pollywood’’, which described it as a high-octane Punjabi action thriller. 5 Dariya News rated the film 4 out of 5 stars, praising the performances, particularly those of Kull Sidhu and Marc Randhawa, as well as the background score. However, the review criticised aspects of the screenplay and the editing of certain fight sequences, noting inconsistencies in their day-to-night presentation.
