= Pooja Verma =

- Born: Delhi, India
- Occupation: Actress
- Years active: 2014-present

Pooja Verma is a Punjabi film actress best known her role in "Baaz" opposite Babbu Maan. She is born in Delhi.She had appeared in many Punjabi music videos also. She has worked in Punjabi movies such as 22g Tussi Ghaint Ho, Dakuan Da Munda and 15 Lakh Kado Aauga. Pooja is also known for appearing in Punjabi music video songs Raatan and Kangna.

== Filmography ==
Year	Title	Language	Role	Other notes
2014	Baaz	Punjabi	Pooja	Punjabi Film Debut
2015	22g Tussi Ghaint Ho	Punjabi	Loveleen	co-actor : Bhagwant Maan
2018	Dakuan Da Munda	Punjabi		co-actor : Dev Kharoud

== Music videos ==
Song title	Singer	Language	Other notes
Haaye Mera Dil	Alfaaz	Punjabi	
Motiya	Satinder Sartaj	Punjabi	
Kangna	Preet Harpal	Punjabi	
ladeya na kar	Sonu Kakkar, MS Chandhok		
Raatan	Garry Sandhu		
