= Parmish Verma =

Indian actor and singer (born 1990)

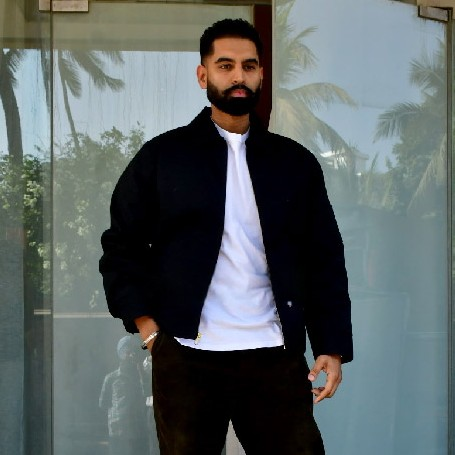
- Verma in 2025
- Born: 3 July 1990 (age 36); Patiala, Punjab, India
- Occupations: Singer; actor; music video director; videographer; rapper
- Years active: 2009–present
- Spouse: Guneet Grewal (m. 2021; div. 2026)
- Children: 1
- Musical career
- Origin: Punjab, India
- Genres: Soundtrack; Pop; hip hop; pop rap
- Instrument: Vocals
- Labels: Speed Records; Times Music; T-Series; Sony Music India; Zee Music Company
- Website: Parmish Verma on Facebook

Parmish Verma (born 3 July 1990) is an Indian singer, rapper, music video director, videographer and actor associated with the Punjabi Music and Punjabi Film Industry. He started his career as a video director then singer, and later debuted as an actor with the film Rocky Mental.

== Early life ==
Parmish Verma was born in Patiala, to a Hindu father Satish Verma, a theatre artist, writer and professor, and a Sikh mother Paramjit Kaur, a professor. He has two siblings; brother Sukhan Verma and sister Sherry Rana.

== Career ==
Parmish started his career as a director with the video Zimmewari Bhukh Te Doori (responsibility, hunger and distance) which was the story of an adolescent boy. It was based on the life experience of Verma where he described the hard time he faced while living in Australia and about the advice given to him by Gurikk Maan, the son of singer Gurdas Maan.

Verma debuted as an actor in the Punjabi movie Rocky Mental in 2017. He has also acted in the lead role in movies like Dil Diyan Gallan (2019), which he wrote and directed. Later he released more movies such as Singham, and most recently Jinde Meriye.

== Personal life ==
In 2018, Parmish was shot by Punjab gangster Dilpreet Baba in Mohali on his way back home from a party, from which he later recovered.

He married his longtime girlfriend, Canadian politician Guneet Grewal, on 20 October 2021.

On 30 September 2022, they had a daughter named Sadaa.

== Selected videography ==
Verma has directed several music videos for various artists like Sharry Mann, Ninja, Akhil, Mankirat Aulakh and Dilpreet Dhillon.

Below are a few selected videos directed by Verma:

Song	Artist(s)
Thokda Reha	Ninja
Gal Jattan Wali	Ninja
Aadat	Ninja
Dil	Ninja
Desi Da Recard	Ninja
License	Ninja
Jatt Da Blood	Mankirt Aulakh
Gallan Mithiyaan	Mankirt Aulakh
Chooreey Wali Baah	Mankirt Aulakh
Khaab	Akhil
Gaani	Akhil
PB 03	Shivjot
SP De Rank Wargi	Nimrat Khaira
Naam Tera	Karan Sehmbi
Yaar Beli	Guri
Wang	Dilpreet Dhillon
Yaaran Da Group	Dilpreet Dhillon
Red Rose	Dilpreet Dhillon
Dasi Na Mere Baare	Goldy Desi Crew
Teri Yaad	Goldy Desi Crew
Teri Kamli	Goldy Desi Crew
2-2 Peg	Goldy Desi Crew
Kise De Kol Gal Na Kri	Goldy Desi Crew
Mere Piche	Monty & Waris
Jatt Sira	Upkar Sandhu
3 Peg	Sharry Maan
Cute Munda	Sharry Maan
Hostel	Sharry Maan
Love You	Sharry Maan
Peg	B Jay Randhawa
Daaru Ale Kihde	Tej Sahi
November	Aakal
Haye Tauba	Shipra Goyal
Teri Wait	Kaur B
Le Chakk Mai Aa Gya	Parmish Verma
Sab Fade Jaange	Parmish Verma
Gaal Ni Kadni	Parmish Verma
Neat	Parmish Verma
Meri Marzi	Parmish Verma
Shadgi	Parmish Verma
Jab Hum Padheya Karte The	Parmish Verma
Chal Oye	Parmish Verma
Kache Pakke Yaar	Parmish Verma

== Discography ==
Parmish Verma has sung the following Punjabi songs:

Song	Year	Music	Lyrics	Label
Le Chakk Main Aa Gaya	2017	Desi Crew	Jimmy Kotakpuria	Speed Records
Gaal Ni Kadni	2017	Desi Crew	Vicky Gill	Speed Records
Chirri Udd Kaa Udd	2018	M. Vee	Laddi Chahal	Speed Records
Shada	2018	Desi Crew	Sarba Maan	Speed Records
Kach Pakke Yaar	2018	Desi Crew	Mandeep Maavi	Speed Records
Sab Fade Jange	2018	Desi Crew	Sarba Maan	Speed Records
4 Yaar	2019	Desi Crew	Laddi Chahal	Speed Records
Pinda Wale Jatt	2019	Desi Crew	Laddi Chahal	Speed Records
Chal Oye	2019	Desi Crew	Laddi Chahal	Parmish Verma
Ja Ve Ja	2019	J-Statik	G Sidhu	Speed Records
Jab Hum Padheya Karte The	2020	Desi Crew	Jimmy Kotakpuria	Speed Records
Klolan	2020	Desi Crew	Kahlon	Times Music
Aam Jahe Munde	2020	Desi Crew	Laddi Chahal	Parmish Verma
Munde Pind De	2020	Agam Maan, Azeem Maan	Laddi Chahal	Gringo Entertain ment
Diamond Da Challa (With Neha Kakkar)	2020	Rajat Nagpal	Vicky Sandhu	Desi Music Factory
Shadgi	2021	Mix Singh	Laddi Chahal	Gringo Entertain ment
Neat	2021	Yeah Proof	Laddi Chahal	Saregama
Till Death	2021	Yeah Proof	Laddi Chahal	White Hill Music
Meri Marzi	2021	Yeah Proof	Homeboy	Saregama
Dil De Showroom (Recreated)	2021	M Vee, Sukhpal Sukh (original)	Reshi Khattanwala	Saregama
Hor Das	2021	Yeah Proof	Homeboy	White Hil Music
Midnight	2021	Mix Singh	Vicky Sandhu	Lokhdun Punjabi
Zindagi	2022	Starboy	Mani Longia	Parmish Verma Films
Dekhi Dekhi	2022	Shekh	Laddi Chahal	Parmish Verma Films
Caran Caran	2022	Laddi Gill	Laddi Chahal	Times Music
Kya Baat Hai	2022	DesiFrenzy	Laddi Chahal	Parmish Verma Films

== Filmography ==
Year	Film	Notes
2017	Rocky Mental	Debut film
2019	Singham	Remake of the Hindi film Singham
2019	Dil Diyan Gallan	Written and directed by himself
2020	Jinde Meriye	Written and directed by Pankaj Batra
2022	Main Te Bapu	Produced by himself
2024	Tabaah	Directed by himself
2025	Kanneda	Debut series
2026	War of Shera	
