= Rocky Mental =

2017 Punjabi-language sports action drama film

- Directed by: Vikram Thori
- Written by: Vikram Thori, Sanjay Saini Sanju
- Screenplay by: Uday Pratap Singh
- Produced by: Vijay Saini, vimal chopra(Co Producer)
- Starring: Parmish Verma; Tannu Kaur Gill; Mahabir Bullar; Dheeraj Kumar; Jagjeet Sandhu; Karanveer Khullar; Kanika Mann; Jagjit Singh Bajwa; Asli Maharaja, Jagjit Singh; Darshan Aulakh
- Music by: Desi Crew
- Production company: Dhamrait Film Production
- Release date: 19 August 2017
- Country: India
- Language: Punjabi
- Budget: ₹1.3 Crore
- Box office: ₹3.79 Crore

Rocky Mental (2017) is a Punjabi sports action drama film about the rise of a boxing phenomenon and the barriers in his way, starring Parmish Verma and Tannu Kaur Gill directed by Vikram Thori. It is the story of a star athlete whose belief in his own invincibility makes him disregard the lurking threats posed by his own abrasive personality. It is the debut movie of Punjabi video director, actor, singer Parmish Verma

== Plot ==
Rajdeep Singh Dhaliwal, aka Rocky Mental, is a national level boxing champion preparing for Commonwealth Games, which are to be held in Australia, along with his best friend/brother in arms, Preet. Though Rocky is only concentrated towards Commonwealth Games though one day, he gets himself in a brawl with Maninder Shergill, brother of a Punjab Cabinet Minister, when Rocky talks to Maninder's girl Ibadat which angers Maninder and later leads to Rocky knocking down Maninder in one punch.

With the passage of time, Rocky and Ibadat gets closer to each other and fall in love making Maninder jealous thus, and he plans a dangerous trap for Rocky, which involves Preet committing suicide & Ibadat filing a case against Rocky (due to a small scuffle between 2 Rocky punches Ibadat. Maninder supports Ibadat to file a case of assault which Maninder turns into a rape case after using his influence unknown to Ibadat). Meanwhile, broken due to Preet's suicide, an attempt to murder is made on Rocky by another athlete and Maninder's henchman. In the hospital, his coach informs Rocky of all the incidents & Rocky being imprisoned for rape.

Meanwhile, things get tough between Maninder and Ibadat when Ibadat gets to know the truth, but Maninder stops her to take any step further in favour of Rocky. In jail, Maninder meets Rocky and laughs at him, making Rocky angry & breaking out of jail during a court hearing. He severely assaults Maninder's henchman and athlete, who tells Rocky the truth that Preet did not commit suicide but was murdered on Maninder's orders, and so Rocky kills the henchman and athlete in the same way his best friend died.

When Rocky and Maninder meet face to face, Rocky knocks down Maninder's henchmen & later burns Maninder alive. To revenge his brother's death, enraged by Maninder's brother, the Minister, kidnaps Ibadat, but she is later freed when Rocky reaches on the spot, killing the Minister but shot by the minister's henchman. Unknown to Rocky's coach and Ibadat, Rocky is still alive living in another country.

== Cast ==
- Parmish Verma as Rocky/ Rajdeep Singh Dhaliwal
- Tannu Kaur Gill as Ibadat, Rocky's love interest
- Mahabir Bhullar as coach Bariyam Singh Sekhon
- Dheeraj Kumar as Preet, Rocky's best friend
- Kanika Mann as Seerat, Preet's love interest
- Jagjeet Sandhu as Dahiya
- Karanveer Khullar as Maninder Shergill
- Jagjit Singh Bajwa as Davinder
- Akash King as Invisible Man
- Darshan Aulakh as Maninder Shergill's Elder Brother
- Rimple Dhindsa

== Soundtrack ==
All songs composed by Desi Crew, with lyrics by Deep Kaur Vehniwal

- "Vaddey Velly" by Ninja (singer)
- "Yaara" by Sharry Mann
- "Yaar Khade Ne" Dilpreet Dhillon
- "Tere To Baigar" Manjit Sahota
- "Yaar Di Weeding" Goldy Desi Crew
