= Sajjan Singh Rangroot =

2018 Indian Punjabi-language film by Pankaj Batra

- Theatrical release poster
- Directed by: Pankaj Batra
- Written by: Gurpreet Singh Palheri
- Screenplay by: Pankaj Batra; Gurpreet Singh Palheri; Gulshan Singh
- Produced by: Jay Sahni; Sona Sahni; Bobby Bajaj
- Starring: Diljit Dosanjh; Jagjeet Sandhu; Yograj Singh; Sunanda Sharma
- Cinematography: Vineet Malhotra
- Edited by: Manish More
- Music by: Jatinder Shah
- Production company: Vivid Art House
- Release date: 23 March 2018
- Country: India
- Language: Punjabi
- Box office: ₹26 crore

Sajjan Singh Rangroot is a 2018 Indian Punjabi-language war drama film directed by Pankaj Batra. It stars Diljit Dosanjh, Yograj Singh and Sunanda Sharma. The film is based on the experiences of Sikh soldiers of the British Indian Army fighting on the Western Front during World War I. The film was released on 23 March 2018 to coincide with the death anniversary of Bhagat Singh. Sajjan Singh Rangroot is eighth highest grossing Punjabi film of all time and third highest-grossing film of 2018.

== Plot ==
In the present, many Sikh volunteers under Khalsa Aid come to the Syria–Iraq border to help out refugees. An elderly Sikh volunteer tells his volunteers (especially a curious girl) about Sajjan Singh Rangroot, a soldier who fought in World War I.

In the early 20th century, Sajjan was a young Sikh man who disliked the British. Sajjan's father worked for the British, and wanted his son to work for the British as well. As World War I was going on, Sajjan wanted to be a soldier for the British Indian army. He hoped that if the British won, India would gain independence. His father disliked the idea, but his mother was not against it. Thus, Sajjan joined the army after an emotional farewell from his family. Joining the Lahore Regiment, Sajjan befriended a number of other soldiers: Dheera, Teja, Lacchman Das, and Mela Singh. Dheera was scared of war and wished to get married and raise a family, Teja was arrogant, Lachman was very fluent in English, and Mela Singh was a habitual liar, and whose lies often led to humorous incidents. The Subedar (leader) of the regiment was Zorawar Singh, a veteran of many wars. After rigorous training, the unit ships out to Britain to fight.

When the regiment reaches Britain, many British soldiers make fun of the Sikhs. The regiment, meanwhile, continues their training. At a tea shop, Sajjan and a British soldier get into a confrontation, but the owner of the shop, a woman named Becky, stops them to prevent damage to her shop. Sajjan leaves the soldier alone, and Becky starts to take a liking to him. Sajjan finds out about this, but he is betrothed to a woman named Jeeti.

The Sikhs and British discover that the Germans have overrun many British trenches, and they are forced to make it to a trench before the next German attack. As they are moving towards their objective, the Germans attack. However, the Sikhs and British get the trench and later capture the main German trench line, forcing the Germans to retreat. However, Dheera is killed during the action. Sajjan is traumatised, but Zorawar rallies Sajjan to continue fighting. The Germans discover that Sikhs are fighting on the British side in the war, and send them a letter. The letter offers the Sikhs better equipment, food, and higher pay in return for defecting to the German side. Sajjan refuses on the grounds that Sikhs should not be traitors.

After a month in the trenches, Mela Singh tells Sajjan that it is Baisakhi. However, the Baisakhi is a sad one. Seeing this, Sajjan tries to encourage his fellow soldiers by singing a song. The Germans subsequently attack the trench, and the Sikhs and the British are forced to retreat, with Teja being killed in the fighting. Sajjan decides to cross the battlefield alone and bomb the trench. Sajjan is successful, and the Germans in the trench are killed. However, Sajjan dies as well.

In India, British and locals alike pay their respects to Sajjan. In the present, the elderly Sikh volunteer shows the curious girl a photo of Zorawar (who is revealed to be the volunteer's grandfather) and Sajjan. The Sikh volunteers are inspired to follow the example of Sajjan Singh Rangroot.

== Cast ==
- Diljit Dosanjh as Sep. Sajjan Singh
- Yograj Singh as Sub. Zorawar Singh
- Darren Tassell Sgt. Mark Campbell
- Sunanda Sharma as Jeeti Kaur
- Jagjeet Sandhu as Teja Singh
- Dheeraj Kumar as Dheera Singh
- Gunjyot Singh as Lachhman Daas
- Jarnail Singh as Mela Singh
- Mahabir Bhullar as Khalsa Aid volunteer
- Ravi Singh as himself
- Alex Reece as Jack
- Peter Irving as Colonel George Smith
- Caroline Wilde as Becky
- Jaswant Daman as Jeeti's mother

== Production ==
Faversham Market in Kent was used in multiple scenes of the film, in which WWI soldiers are seen marching through the town.

== Soundtrack ==
All the songs of the soundtrack album were composed by Jatinder Shah. The song Pyaas was composed by Uttam Singh.

No.	Title	Lyrics	Singer(s)	Length
1.	"Roti"	Rav Hanjra	Diljit Dosanjh	3:22
2.	"Sajjna"	Raj Ranjodh	Diljit Dosanjh	2:41
3.	"Pyaas"	Dev Kohli	Diljit Dosanjh	4:35
4.	"Peepa"	Veet Baljit	Diljit Dosanjh	2:47
5.	"Mera Ki Mareya"	Veet Baljit	Diljit Dosanjh	2:56
6.	"Firdosya"	Raj Ranjodh	Raj Ranjodh	4:19
7.	"Anhad Anhad"	Raj Ranjodh	Raj Ranjodh	5:54
Total length:				00:25:14

== Reception ==
=== Critical response ===
Mike McCahill of The Guardian gave three stars out of five and concluded "Batra hits most of his big emotional beats, rightly sensing there might be something stirring and striking in the sight of beturbaned warriors charging across a field in Belgium". Jyoti Sharma Bawa of Hindustan Times gave two stars out of five, She said "Sajjan Singh Rangroot's main fault is that it tries to do much".

== Release ==
On 22 June 2018, Sajjan Singh Rangroot's internet rights were acquired by SHAREit.
