= Mad Sandhu =

Indian social media influencer and makeup artist (1996/1997–2026)

- Born: Madhusudan Sandhu; 1996 or 1997
- Died: 3 October 2026 (aged 29); Amritsar, Punjab, India
- Occupations: Costume designer; make-up artist

Madhusudan Sandhu (1996 or 1997 – 3 October 2026), popularly known as Mad Sandhu, was an Indian LGBTQ social media influencer, stylist, costume designer and make-up artist from Punjab.

== Career ==
Sandhu founded Mane Lane Unisex Salon in Amritsar and appeared in Punjabi song Ragda and Punjabi film Oye Bhole Oye 2. He also appeared in the web series, Youth Kartoot. According to reports, he was set to appear in Bigg Boss.

In 2021, Josh Talks featured him as a presenter discussing makeup and his personal life.

At the time of his death, he reportedly had 230,000 followers on Instagram.

== Death ==
On 3 October 2026, Sandhu was shot dead by two unidentified bikers in Amritsar, Punjab. The shooting took place at a car wash. Sandhu was taken to a hospital immediately following the shooting and was pronounced deceased. He was 29. Police are currently investigating the motive behind the attack. Ahmedabad Crime Branch has taken 6 people into the custody from Gujarat. Police tracked their location through a QR code payment they made.
