= Mandeep Benipal =

Indian film director

- Occupation: Film director
- Years active: 2010–present
- Known for: Sadda Haq
- Notable work: Sadda Haq

Mandeep Benipal is an Indian film director. He made his directorial debut with movie Ekam - Son of Soil in 2010. Later he came up with the movie Sadda Haq (2013), Yoddha (2014) and Dakuan Da Munda.

== Career ==
Mandeep Benipal started his career as an assistant director. He assisted director Manoj Punj for movie Shaheed-E-Mohabbat Boota Singh (1999) starring Gurdas Maan, Divya Dutta and Des Hoyaa Pardes (2004) starring Gurdas Maan, Juhi Chawla. He also assisted Gaurav Trehan for movie Hashar (2008) starring Babbu Maan.

Mandeep Benipal made his debut as a director in the year 2010 with Punjabi movie Ekam - Son of Soil starring Babbu Maan, Mandy Takhar. The film opened to a good response at the box office.

In 2013, Mandeep Benipal came up with movie Sadda Haq in the year 2013. Sadda Haq is based on the events in the 1980s and 1990s when the state suffered from militancy, portrays several issues; including the murder of a human rights activist, alleged police torture, fake encounters, jailbreak and the assassination of a politician. This movie performed really well at box office. It was also a hit in UK. Sadda Haq was nominated in 10 different categories in PTC Punjabi Film Awards 2014 and the movie succeeded in winning three of them. Sadda Haq was initially banned by the Punjab Government, which stated that "The release of the film was banned to maintain communal harmony in the state". This movie was later released after the order of Supreme Court to lift the ban. Censor Board of India's gave this movie A Certificate.

In 2014, he came up with movie Yoddha - The Warrior starring Kuljinder Singh Sidhu in lead role. The film is based on the life of a simple person who becomes a warrior due to circumstances. Yoddha was notimated for 6 categories in PTC Punjabi Film Awards 2015.

In 2018, he directed Dakuan Da Munda.

== Filmography ==
- Ekam - Son of Soil (2010)
- Sadda Haq (2013)
- Yoddha (2014)
- Dakuaan Da Munda (2018)
- Kaka Ji (2019)
- DSP Dev (2019)
- Dakuaan Da Munda 2 (2022)
- DJ Wale Babu (2022)

== Awards ==
Benipal was nominated in Best Director category of PTC Punjabi Film Awards 2014.
