= Rupinder Rupi =

Indian actress

- Born: Rupinder Rupi; Barnala,Punjab, India
- Occupations: Actress; Theatre artist

Rupinder Rupi or Roopi Rupinder is an Indian actress, who is known for her work in the Punjabi film industry. She is famous for appearing in mother's role in most of the films. Her most well-known works are the films Mera Pind, Bailaras, Laavaan Phere, Nadhoo Khan.

== Early life and career ==
Rupi was born in Amritsar, Punjab, India. She started her acting career as a theater artist.

== Filmography ==
- Mannat (2006) as Rupinder Kaur
- Mehndi Wale Hath (2006) as Gugni's mother
- Majaajan (2008)
- Mera Pind (2008) as Ruldu's mother
- Peele Patteyaan Di Dastaan (2008)
- Munde U.K. De (2009)
- Chak Jawana (2010)
- Anhoye (TV series) (2012)
- Rahe Chardi Kala Punjab Di (2012)
- Yaar Pardesi (2012) as Rupinder Barnala
- Jatts in Golmaal (2013)
- Haani (2013) as Gejo Bhua
- Nazara Singh Dheeth Jawaai (2015) as Gyan Kaur
- Mitti Na Pharol Jogiya (2015) as Bebe
- Burf (2015)
- Gadaar: The Traitor (2015) as Rupinder Roopi
- Once Upon a Time in Amritsar (2016) as Gurtej's mother
- Gelo (2016) as Gelo Jagtar's Mother
- 25 Kille (2016)
- Darra (2016) as Balkar's Mother
- Desi Munde (2016) as Jaswant Kaur
- Yaar Annmulle 2 (2017)
- Arjan (2017) as Arjan's Mother
- Saab Bahadar (2017) as Deepi's Maami
- Vekh Baraatan Challiyan (2017) as Gurmeet Kaur
- Rupinder Gandhi 2: The Robin Hood (2017)
- Bailaras (2017)
- Jatt Vs Rabb (2017) as Tayi
- Punjab Singh (2018) as Tayi
- Laavan Phere (2018) as Gurmel Kaur
- Tabbar (2018)
- Daana Paani (2018) as Basant's Aunt
- Asees (2018) as Singh Kaur
- Vadhayiyaan Ji Vadhayiyaan (2018)
- Dhol Ratti (2018) as Bebe
- Parahuna (2018)
- Marriage Palace (2018) as Gurnam Kaur
- Do Dooni Panj (2019) as Anju Devi
- Baby Dolls (2019) as Maami Mukho
- Band Vaaje (2019) as Billo's mother
- Munda Faridkotia (2019) as Kulwant Kaur Brar
- Nadhoo Khan (2019) as Paasho
- Shadaa (2019) as Boli vali lady
- Mindo Taseeldarni (2019) as Gobindi
- Munda Hi Chahida (2019) as BUA
- Jugni Yaaran Di (2019) as Tea shop owner
- Singham (2019) as Dilsher's mother
- Naukar Vahuti Da (2019) as Goldy's mother
- Surkhi Bindi (2019) as Satya Bhua
- Doorbeen (2019) as Shindo Sarpanchni
- Ardab Mutiyaran (2019) as Babbu's mother
- Amaanat (2019)
- Sufna (2020) as Complaining lady #2
- Balli Te Bandook (2021) as Jeeto's Mother
- Viaah Ch Gaah (2021)
- Waleed (2021) as Pritam Kaur
- Shivjot: Pro Jatts (2021) as Mother Role
- Dukhan Da Darya (2021)
- Mitti (2021)
- Qismat 2 (2021) as Kaabil's mother
- Paani Ch Madhaani (2021)
- Jal Wayu Enclave (2022) as Yaad's mother
- Mera Vyah Kara Do (2022)
- Main Viyah Nahi Karona Tere Naal (2022) as Nimmo
- Galwakdi (2022) as Jagteshwar's Mother
- Maa (2022)
- Sass Meri Ne Munda Jamya (2022)
- True Life - Monty Marzara (2022) as Mother
- Lover (2022) as Heer's mother
- Bajre Da Sitta (2022) as Ratan's mother
- Beautiful Billo (2022)
- Jitt De Nishan (2022)
- Valaiti Yantar (2022) as Banto
- Oye Bhole Oye (2024)
