= Qissa Panjab =

- Directed by: Jatinder Mauhar
- Written by: Uday Pratap Singh
- Produced by: Annu Bains
- Starring: Jagjeet Sandhu; Preet Bhullar; Kul Sidhu; Dheeraj Kumar
- Cinematography: Apal Singh
- Edited by: Shekhar Koditkar
- Production company: Pukhraj Production House
- Release date: 16 October 2015
- Country: India
- Language: Punjabi

Qissa Panjab is a 2015 Punjabi film directed by Jatinder Mauhar. It is a story of six individuals and how their lives take a significant turn when they meet each other.

== Cast ==
- Preet Bhullar
- Kul Sidhu
- Dheeraj Kumar
- Jagjeet Sandhu
- Aman Dhaliwal
- Harshjot Kaur
- Binder Pal Fateh
- Amrat Sandhu

== Music ==
- Bolian - Manna Mand
- Jinde meriye - Nooran Sisters
- Rog - Gurdas Maan
- Rutt Pyaar Di - Manna Mand

== Reception ==
=== Critical response ===
Jasmine Singh of The Tribune wrote that film is "indeed a praise-worthy effort to come out with the real and existing scenario of Punjab".
