= Gangland: The City of Crime =

Indian action film

- Theatrical release poster
- Directed by: Savio Sandhu
- Written by: Savio Sandhu
- Produced by: KV Dhillon
- Starring: Sippy Gill; Nishawn Bhullar; Amiek Virk; Dheeraj Kumar; Kul Sidhu; Hobby Dhaliwal
- Production company: Geet MP3
- Release date: 25 April 2025
- Country: India
- Language: Punjabi

Gangland: The City of Crime is a 2025 Indian Punjabi-language action crime film written and directed by Savio Sandhu. The film is based on the 2018 Punjabi web series Gangland in Motherland. The film stars Sippy Gill, Nishawn Bhullar, Amiek Virk Dheeraj Kumar, Kul Sidhu, Hobby Dhaliwal and Vadda Grewal. The film was released theatrically on 25 April 2025. The story explores gang rivalries and violent power struggles set against the backdrop of Punjab's criminal underworld.

== Plot ==
Set in Punjab, Gangland: The City of Crime begins in 1986 with two best friends, Sultan and Hakam, who lead a six-member robbery gang. After a successful heist in a village, Sultan decides to retire from crime, but Hakam disagrees, leading to a confrontation between the two. Their falling out sets off a cycle of revenge, eventually drawing in new rival gangs and escalating the conflict. The story, adapted from the web series Gangland in Motherland, portrays the impact of crime on individuals and society, with comparisons to Gangs of Wasseypur for its gritty, realistic tone.

== Cast ==
- Sippy Gill
- Nishawn Bhullar
- Amiek Virk
- Dheeraj Kumar
- Harv Cheema
- Vadda Grewal
- Devi Grewal
- Kul Sidhu
- Baljinder Banis
- Hobby Dhaliwal
- Paramveer Singh
- Victor John

== Soundtrack ==
Three songs from Gangland: The City of Crime were released before the film's release. The tracks include the title song performed by Guri Lahoria, "Jail" by Labh Heera, and "City Gangland" by Deep Jandu and Mijaz.

== Reception ==
According to Punjabi Mania, Gangland: The City of Crime is praised as a landmark film for Punjabi cinema. The review highlights the film's bold, intense narrative, engaging story, and well-timed twists. Performances by Vadda Grewal, Kul Sidhu, and Hobby Dhaliwal were noted for their precision and attitude.

The Pollywood published a favourable review of ‘‘Gangland: The City of Crime’’, praising the performances of Nishawn Bhullar, Sippy Gill, Dheeraj Kumar and Hardeep Grewal, along with the film’s cinematography and action sequences.
