= Dakuaan Da Munda =

- Theatrical release poster
- Directed by: Mandeep Benipal
- Screenplay by: Inderpal; Gurpreet Bhullar
- Based on: Dakuan Da Munda by Mintu Gurusaria
- Produced by: Ravneet Kaur Chahal; Rajesh Kumar Arora
- Starring: Dev Kharoud; Pooja Verma; Jagjeet Sandhu; Lucky Dhaliwal; Hardeep Gill; Sukhdeep Sukh; Anita Meet; Kuljinder Sidhu; Vinod Kumar
- Cinematography: Dhirendra Nath
- Music by: Laddi Gill; Byg Byrd
- Distributed by: Omjee Group
- Release date: 10 August 2018
- Running time: 144 minutes
- Country: India
- Language: Punjabi
- Box office: ₹15.00 crore

Dakuaan Da Munda (English: The Bandits’ Son) is a 2018 Indian Punjabi biographical film adapted from a novel of same title. The film plots the life of former Kabaddi player Mintu Gurusaria from Gurusar Jodha village, Muktsar. The film is directed by Mandeep Benipal, and features Dev Kharoud, Jagjeet Sandhu, Sukhdeep Sukh and Pooja Verma in lead characters along with Lucky Dhaliwal and Hardeep Gill. The film was released on 10 August 2018.

== Cast ==
- Dev Kharoud as Mintu Gurusaria alias Baljinder Singh Sandhu
- Pooja Verma as Rajji
- Jagjeet Sandhu as Romi Gill
- Lucky Dhaliwal as Junglee
- Hardeep Gill as Mintu Gurusaria Father
- Sukhdeep Sukh as Bhau
- Anita Meet as Mintu Gurusaria Mother
- Kuljinder Sidhu
- Vinod kumar

== Release ==
Dakuan Da Munda was released on 10 August 2018.

== Soundtrack ==
The music soundtrack of Dakuaan Da Munda was composed by Byg Byrd, Laddi Gill, Veer Baljit and Young Blood. They consists of six tracks.

Tracklist
No.	Title	Lyrics	Music	Artist(s)	Length
1.	"Dollar"	Sidhu Moose Wala	Byg Byrd	Sidhu Moose Wala	2:37
2.	"Marzi De Faisle"	Gill Raunta	Laddi Gill	Himmat Sandhu	2:37
3.	"Zindagi"	Gill Raunta	Laddi Gill	Nachhatar Gill	3:39
4.	"Pyaar"	Qaistrax	Veet Baljit	Veet Baljit, Shilpra Goyal	2:47
5.	"Dakuaan Da Munda"	Simma Ghuman	Young Blood	Bunty Numberdar	2:32
6.	"Khalnayak"	Qaistrax	Veer Baljit	Angrej Ali	3:10
Total length:					17:03

== Reception ==
=== Box office ===
Dakuan Da Munda opened as second highest Punjabi film of 2018 after Carry On Jatta 2 and sixth highest of all time. Film raked ₹2.06 Crores on its opening day from India. Film had grossed ₹64.6 lacs at Australian Box Office and ₹22.6 lacs in New Zealand. In Canada Dakuaan Da Munda had grossed ₹1.63 Crores and ₹38.2 lacs in USA.

=== Critical reception ===
Amit Arora of The Times of India gave the film a rating of 3 out of 5, noting, "...the movie is perhaps a tad more honest than most such movies are known to be, though just as high on romanticizing and eulogizing the main character... The film is not a social commentary on the drug menace of Punjab but more like one person's story, by which he hopes to inspire others to kick the habit." Arora praised the movie for sticking to the story's "tight curves" as well as the performances of the lead actors. However he criticized some fight scenes and the music in the film. Arora also noted, "Given that it is apparently the first Punjabi film based on an autobiography, it is not a bad start for the regional film industry."

== Sequel ==
A sequel named Dakuaan Da Munda 2 was released in cinemas on 27 May 2022.
