= Dakuaan Da Munda 2 =

- Theatrical release poster
- Directed by: Mandeep Benipal
- Screenplay by: Narinder Ambersaria
- Story by: Manga Singh Antal
- Based on: Shararti Tatt by Manga Singh Antal
- Produced by: Ravneet Kaur Chahal; Rajesh Kumar Arora; Ashu Munish Sahni
- Starring: Dev Kharoud; Japji Khaira; Nishawn Bhullar; Raj Singh Jhinger; Lucky Dhaliwal; Preet Baath
- Cinematography: Dharendra Shukla
- Edited by: Omkar Nath Bhakri
- Music by: Nick Dhammu; Haakam
- Production company: Dream Reality Movies
- Distributed by: Omjee Group
- Release date: 27 May 2022
- Running time: 152 minutes
- Country: India
- Language: Punjabi

Dakuaan Da Munda 2 (English: The Bandits’ Son 2) is a 2022 Indian Punjabi autobiographical film based on the life of a drug addict Manga Singh Antal. The film is an adaptation of a Punjabi book named Shararti Tatt, which narrates the life and hardships faced by Manga Singh Antal. The film is directed by Mandeep Benipal under the banner of Dream Reality Movies. The film is produced by Ravneet Kaur Chahal, Rajesh Kumar Arora and Ashu Munish Sahni. The film features Dev Kharoud, Japji Khaira, Nishawn Bhullar, and Raj Singh Jhinger in lead characters along with Lucky Dhaliwal and Karanveer Khullar. The film is a sequel to 2018 film Dakuan Da Munda. The film was released worldwide in cinemas on 27 May 2022.

== Premise ==
An autobiography of the famous writer and teacher Manga Singh Antal, a young Kabaddi and Volleyball player Manga became a drug addict which introduced him to crime.

== Cast ==
- Dev Kharoud as Manga Singh Antal
- Japji Khaira
- Nishawn Bhullar
- Raj Singh Jhinger
- Lucky Dhaliwal
- Karanveer Khullar
- Preet Baath
- Balwinder Bullet
- Deep Mandeep
- Sahib Singh
- Anita Meet
- Gurmukh Ginni
- Bobby Aujla

== Production ==
The film was announced in 2019. The shooting of the film started in November 2020 near Ambala, Chandigarh and Punjab The teaser of the film was released on 10 April 2022. The trailer was released on 1 May 2022.

== Music ==
The music of the film is composed by Nick Dhammu and Haakam and lyrics are written by Veet Baljit and Gill Raunta. The film's background score is composed by Salil Amrute.

Tracklist
No.	Title	Lyrics	Music	Singer(s)	Length
1.	"Gundagardi"	Veet Baljit	Nick Dhammu	Himmat Sandhu	3:20
2.	"Shy-Sang Lagdi Aa"	Veet Baljit	Nick Dhammu	Shipra Goyal, Veet Baljit	2:58
3.	"Balle Balle"	Veet Baljit	Nick Dhammu	Nachhatar Gill	3:16
4.	"Most Wanted"	Gill Raunta	Haakam	Himmat Sandhu	3:15
5.	"Khang Khang"	Veet Baljit	Nick Dhammu	Nachhatar Gill, Gurlez Akhtar	3:14
Total length:					16:04

== Release ==
The film was released worldwide in cinemas on 27 May 2022.

=== Home Media Release ===
The movie was also Release on the Chaupal OTT platform for the Digital audiences,.
