= Warning 2 =

Indian action drama film

- Theatrical release poster
- Directed by: Amar Hundal
- Written by: Gippy Grewal; Nasir Zaman
- Produced by: Gippy Grewal; Siddharth Anand Kumar; Vikram Mehra.
- Starring: Gippy Grewal; Prince Kanwaljit Singh; Jasmin Bhasin
- Cinematography: Baljit Singh Deo
- Edited by: Gurjeet Hundal
- Music by: Mad Mix; Avvy Sra
- Production company: Humble Motion Pictures
- Release date: 2 February 2024
- Country: India
- Language: Punjabi

Warning 2 is a 2024 Indian Punjabi-language action drama film directed by Amar Hundal, written by Gippy Grewal and Nasir Zaman. The film is produced by Gippy Grewal, Siddharth Anand Kumar, and Vikram Mehra. The film stars Gippy Grewal, Prince Kanwaljit Singh, Jasmin Bhasin and Dheeraj Kumar. The film was released on 2 February 2024.

== Plot ==
In the present, Geja (Gippy Grewal) is serving time in prison after failing to assassinate his rival Pamma (Prince Kanwaljit Singh), who is lodged in the same jail under heavy security. Still determined to kill Pamma, Geja becomes entangled in a volatile ecosystem of inmates that includes gangs led by Gela, Bhamakad and Zora, each with their own vendettas and shifting loyalties. The predator–prey dynamic between Geja and Pamma intensifies as both men navigate betrayals, covert attacks and uneasy alliances behind bars.

The situation escalates when a ruthless police officer, Ranjit Singh (Rahul Dev), decides to transfer the most dangerous prisoners, including Geja and Pamma, to another facility in Rajasthan, using the move to assert control and settle old scores. As the convoy journey unfolds, rival criminals and hidden enemies exploit the transfer to strike, turning the route into a battleground where multiple factions attempt to eliminate Geja and Pamma. The events of the transfer force long-standing grudges and dark secrets from Geja’s past to the surface, pushing all involved deeper into a cycle of violence, revenge and moral compromise.

== Cast ==
- Gippy Grewal as Geja
- Kanchan sangha as Geja sister
- Prince Kanwaljit Singh as Pamma
- Jasmin Bhasin as Ronak
- Jaggi Singh as Rana
- Dheeraj Kumar as Keepa
- Rahul Dev as Inspector Ranjit Singh
- Hobby Dhaliwal as Gurdyal Singh (Ronak's father)
- Rupinder Rupi as Ronak's mother
- Sardar Sohi as Geja's father
- Raj Singh Jhinjar as Gella
- Raghveer Boli as Setti

== Release ==
The film was released worldwide in cinemas on 2 February 2024.

== Reception ==
Sukhpreet Kahlon, for The Indian Express, found, "Despite some intriguing elements, Gippy Grewal starrer Warning 2 is a sequel that fails to do more than take forward a needlessly complicated circle of revenge." In a review for The Times of India, Archika Khurana described the film as "a far-fetched continuation of the narrative packed with electrifying action scenes."

== Sequel ==
A month after the release, the production company announced a third instalment.
