= Nseeb =

- Birth name: Bikramdeep Singh Dhaliwal
- Origin: Surrey, BC, Canada
- Genres: Hip hop
- Occupation(s): Rapper, songwriter
- Instrument: Vocals

Bikramdeep Singh Dhaliwal, known professionally as Nseeb, is a Punjabi rapper based in Canada. He came to Vancouver when he was 18, as a Punjabi immigrant. He was born in Mullanpur, Punjab. The track 'Old Skool,' with the Punjabi artist Sidhu Moose Wala and Prem Dhillon became a breakthrough track for Nseeb. He has also worked with other artist like Sidhu Moose Wala, Tarsem Jassar, Varinder Brar and Jagowale.

== Discography ==
=== Extended plays ===
List of EPs, with selected details and chart positions
Title	EP details
Say My Name (with Ikky)	Released: 13 August 2021; Label: 4N Records; Format: Digital download, Streaming
