= DSP Dev =

2019 film directed by Mandeep Benipal

- Directed by: Mandeep Benipal
- Written by: Inder Pal Singh
- Produced by: Ravneet Kaur Chahal; Rajesh Kumar; Gunbir Singh Sidhu; Manmord Sidhu
- Starring: Dev Kharoud; Mehreen Pirzada; Manav Vij; Girija Shankar
- Cinematography: Dhirendra Shukla
- Edited by: Vinay Pal
- Music by: Mannan Munjal
- Production companies: Dream Reality Films; White Hill Studios
- Distributed by: White Hill Studios
- Release date: 5 July 2019
- Country: India
- Language: Punjabi

DSP Dev is an Indian Punjabi-language action film directed by Mandeep Benipal. Co-produced by Dreamreality Movies and White Hill Studios; it stars Dev Kharoud, Mehreen Pirzada, and Manav Vij in lead roles. Dev Kharoud plays an honest cop Dev Sher Gill.

The film was released worldwide on 5 July 2019.

== Cast ==
- Dev Kharoud as DSP Dev Shergill
- Mehreen Pirzada as Kirat
- Manav Vij as Rana Brar
- Fateh Gill
- Girija Shankar as MLA Bakhtaawar Brar
- Aman Dhaliwal as SI Paramveer
- Sukhwinder Raj as ASI Aman Singh
- Shavinder Mahal as DSP Balveer Shergill
- Deep Sehgal as Meet
- Tarsem Paul as Kirat's father
- Sanju Solanki as a journalist
- Lakha Lehri as Inspector Lakhwinder Singh
- Pardeep Cheema as Bhaana
- Hashneen Chauhan as Guddi
- Sukh Patraan
- Mahabir Bhullar
- Baljinder Darapuri as Opposite Leader
- Sahib Singh as Dev's senior office

== Soundtrack ==
DSP Dev

Soundtrack album by Gurmeet Singh, Laddi Gill
- Released: 29 June 2019
- Recorded: 2019
- Genre: Feature film soundtrack
- Length: 14:35
- Label: White Hill Music
External audio
- Audio Jukebox on YouTube

The soundtrack is composed by Gurmeet Singh, Laddi Gill and lyrics were by Happy Raikoti, and Gill Raunta. The songs are sung by Nachattar Gill, Mannat Noor, Himmat Sandhu and Kamal Khan.

No.	Title	Singer(s)	Length
1.	"Wadde Jigre"	Himmat Sandhu	3:01
2.	"Daaru Daa Naa Jagda"	Himmat Sandhu	2:10
3.	"Akh Da Nishana"	Mannat Noor	3:05
4.	"Galti Akhiyan Di"	Kamal Khan, Mannat Noor	3:29
5.	"Jindariye"	Nachhatar Gill	2:45
6.	"Deh Shiva"	Udaar, Minda	1:12
