= Aarushi Sharma =

Indian pageant titleholder and actor

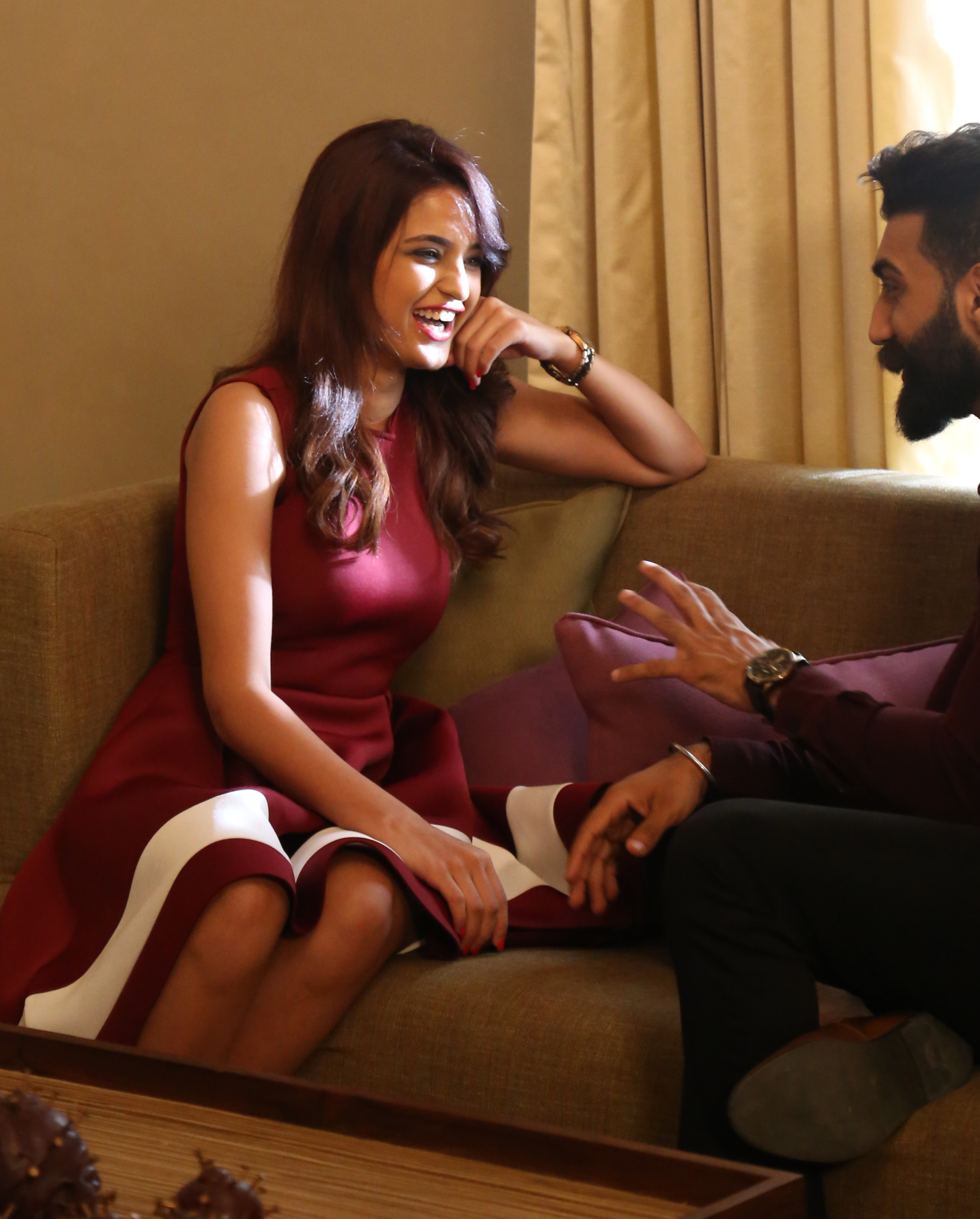
- Education: Amity University, Noida, St. Lawrence Convent School, Delhi
- Occupation: Actress
- Height: 5 ft 06 in (1.68 m)
- Spouse: Babbal Rai (m. 2025)
- Beauty pageant titleholder
- Title: Miss Intercontinental India 2016
- Hair colour: brown
- Eye colour: Hazel
- Major competitions: Miss Universe India 2015 (Top 10); Miss Intercontinental India 2016 (Winner)

Aarushi Sharma is an Indian actress and pageant titleholder. She works mainly in Punjabi-language films and TV shows.

Originally from Himachal Pradesh, Sharma participated in the third edition of Miss Diva in 2015 and was selected as a finalist. In 2016, she participated in the Senorita India pageant, winning the title of Miss Intercontinental India. She represented India at Miss Intercontinental 2016 held in Colombo, Sri Lanka. She has featured in several Punjabi music videos since early 2017.

== Filmography ==
=== Film ===
Year	Film	Character	Notes
2019	Kaka Ji	Deepi	Debut film released on 18 January 2019

Awards and achievements
Preceded by Sneha Priya Roy	Miss Intercontinental India; 2016	Succeeded by Priyanka Kumari
