= Kul Sidhu =

Indian actress

- Born: Kulvinder Kaur Sidhu; Bathinda, Punjab, India
- Occupation: Actress
- Years active: 2011-present
- Website: Kul Sidhu on Instagram

Kul Sidhu (Kulvinder Kaur) is an Indian theatre, television and movie artist, who works in Punjabi cinema. She acted in the National Film Award-winning movie Anhe Ghore Da Daan (2011) playing the role of the wife of a rickshaw-puller, the protagonist of the movie. She has also acted in some short films including Nooran and Sutta Naag.

== Biography ==
Born and brought up in Bathinda in Punjab, India, Kul Sidhu did her schooling from Kendriya Vidyalaya number 5 and graduation from Malwa College.

== Television ==
Studio Bollywood, PTC Chak De - Anchor

== Filmography ==
Year	Film	Character Name	Co-Starring	Language	Notes
2011	Anhe Ghore Da Daan	Ballo	Samuel John	Punjabi	National Film Awards Winner
2012	Yaraan Naal Baharaan 2	Sheenu	Yograj Singh	Punjabi	Punjabi Film
2012	Ajj De Ranjhe	Constable Diljaan Kaur	Gurpreet Ghuggi	Punjabi	Punjabi Film
2014	Nooran	Nooran	Sardar Sohi	Punjabi	Entered 67th Cannes Film Festival
2014	Sutta Naag			Punjabi	Parallel Punjabi cinema
2015	Qissa Panjab			Punjabi	A story of six individuals
2015	Rupinder Gandhi the Gangster..?	Kamal	Dev Kharoud	Punjabi	
2017	Jora 10 Numbaria	Kali	Deep Sidhu	Punjabi	Directed by Amardeep Singh Gill
2020	Jora: The Second Chapter	Kali	Deep Sidhu	Punjabi	Directed by Amardeep Singh Gill
2021	Marjaney	Kesar	Sippy Gill	Punjabi	
2021	Jamraud	Chinnder	Kuljinder Singh Sidhu	Punjabi	
2025	Gangland: The City of Crime				

=== Web series ===
Year	Title	Role	Platform	Notes
2022	Maa Da Deputy	Jassi Gill	TBA	Post-production
2022	CAT	TBA	Netflix India	Starring Randeep Hooda
