= Maa Da Ladla =

- Theatrical release poster
- Directed by: Uday Pratap Singh
- Written by: Deep Jagdeep Jaedy
- Produced by: Manpreet Johal; Ashu Munish Sahni
- Starring: Tarsem Jassar; Neeru Bajwa; Roopi Gill; Iftikhar Thakur; Naseem Vicky
- Cinematography: Jaype Singh
- Edited by: Bharat S Raawat
- Music by: Rao Inderjeet Singh
- Production company: Vehli Janta Films
- Distributed by: Omjee Star Studio
- Release date: 16 September 2022
- Running time: 127 minutes
- Country: India
- Language: Punjabi

Maa Da Ladla is an Indian Punjabi-language comedy film directed by Uday Pratap Singh. The film was initially released on 16 September 2022 in India and USA.

== Plot ==
The story revolves around three characters: Gora, Sehaj and Kevin. Gora is a struggling actor, while Sehaj is a single mother who lives with her son Kevin. Sehaj hires Gora to play Kevin's father.

== Cast ==
- Tarsem Jassar as Gora
- Neeru Bajwa as Sehaj
- Iftikhar Thakur as Safri (Bagga's Uncle)
- Naseem Vicky as Bagga
- Qaiser Piya as doctor
- Olivia McGuinness as School teacher
- Nirmal Rishi as Bachhno (Gora's grandmother)
- Roopi Gill as Binder
- Praveen Kumar Aawara as Money Lender
- Swastik Bhagat as Kevin (Sehaj's son)

== Music ==
The music of the film is composed by Rao Inderjeet Singh (Head of Gem Tunes) . Wazir Patar, Tarsem Jassar, Mehar Vaani, Kiran Sandhu & Kulbir Jhinjer are the playback singers.

Tracklist
No.	Title	Writer(s)	Artist(s)	Length
1.	"Maa Da Ladla"	Tarsem Jassar Jagdeep Warring	Tarsem Jassar & Mehar Vaani	2:43
2.	"Punjab Jeha"	Tarsem Jassar	Wazir Patar and Kiran Sandhu	1:58
3.	"Swag"	Tarsem Jassar	Tarsem Jassar
4.	"Ishq Da Rog"	Kulbir Jhinjer	Kulbir Jhinjer

== Release ==
The film was originally released on 16 September 2022 in India and United States of America and also released in France on 23 September 2022.
