= Prem Dhillon =

Indian singer and songwriter (born 1995)

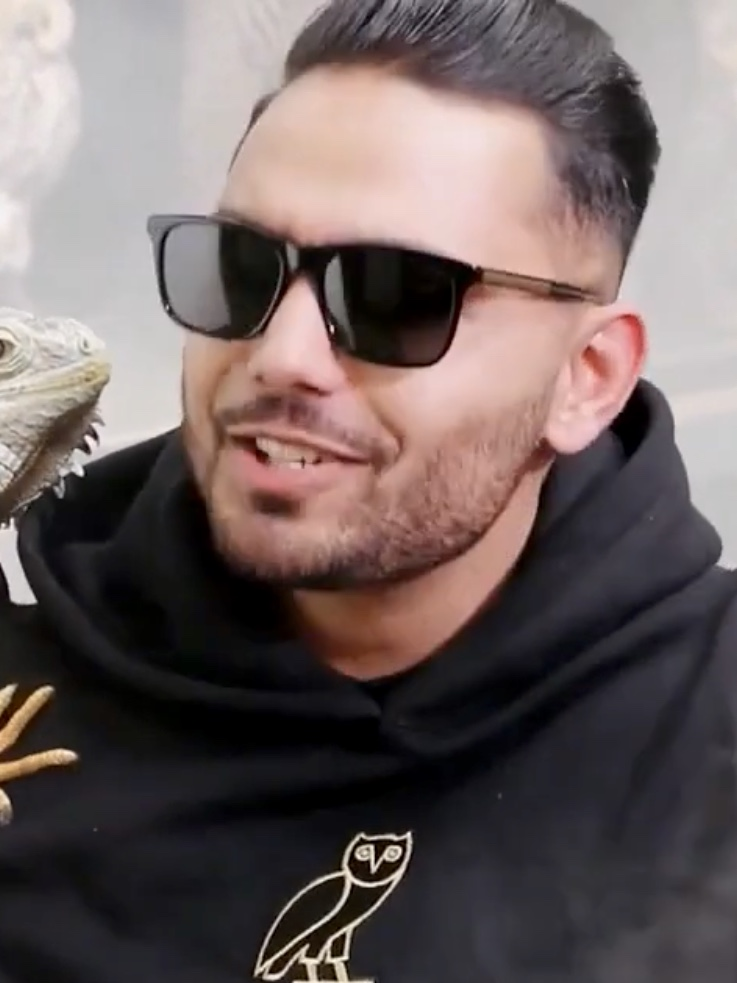
- 2020

Background information
- Born: Premjeet Singh Dhillon; 4 January 1995 (age 31); Amritsar, Punjab, India
- Origin: Punjab, India
- Genres: Punjabi; Bhangra; pop; hip hop
- Occupations: Singer; songwriter; rapper
- Instrument: Vocals
- Years active: 2018–present
- Labels: Sidhu Moose Wala; Thug Life Records; Speed Records
- Spouse: Harmanjeet Kaur Rai (m. 2024)
- Website: Prem Dhillon on Instagram

Premjeet Singh Dhillon (born 4 January 1995) is an Indian singer and songwriter associated with Punjabi music. Dhillon is best known for singles "Boot Cut", "Old Skool" and "Majha Block".

== Personal life ==
Premjeet Singh Dhillon was born on 4 January 1995 in Amritsar, Punjab to Punjabi Sikh parents Kuldeep Singh Dhillon and Bhagwant Kaur. He married his longtime girlfriend Harmanjeet Kaur Rai on 22 January 2024.

== Music career ==
Dhillon's first single was "Chan Milondi", released in March 2018. Later, his "Patt Tenu" from "Mr & Mrs 420 Returns" was released in August 2018. In 2019, his single "Positive Jatt" was released. In September 2019, he finally got his breakthrough with single "Boot Cut", released by Sidhu Moose Wala. As of October 2020, the song has been viewed over 37 million times on YouTube. In January 2020, his single "Old Skool" was released, which also featured Punjabi rappers Sidhu Moose Wala and, Nseeb. The song was viewed over a million times within hours of its release on YouTube; it peaked at number 16 in Apple Music India daily charts. The song was ranked at number 52 in Global, 23 in India, 6 in Australia, in Canada, and 2 in New Zealand on YouTube music charts. On the BBC's Asian music chart, the song entered top the 20, and became Dhillon's first song to reach the chart. In April 2020, he released the single "Jatt Hunde Aa", which debuted at number 38 on Apple Music chart in India. A music video of this song was released in June 2020.

== Beef with Moose Wala ==
On 3 February 2025, shots were fired outside Dhillon's home in Canada. Shortly afterward, a gangster associate of Arsh Dala took credit for the shots on social media, where he accused Dhillon of betraying Sidhu Moose Wala after his death and warned of further consequences.

== Discography ==
=== Albums ===
Title	Album details	Peak chart positions
Title	Album details	CAN
Limitless	Release date: 25 October 2023; Label: Prem Dhillon; Music: San-B, Rass, The Kidd, Snappy; No. of tracks: 7; Format: digital download, streaming	—
Majhaestic	Release date: 19 June 2026; Label: Prem Dhillon; No. of tracks: 10; Format: digital download, streaming	51

=== Extended plays ===
Title	EP details
No Lookin' Back	Release date: 11 August 2022; Label: Prem Dhillon; Music: The Kidd, San B, Snappy; No. of tracks: 5; Format: digital download, streaming
Archives	Release date: 9 December 2022; Label: Prem Dhillon; Music: Inder, Opi Music, ProdGK; No. of tracks: 6; Format: digital download, streaming

=== Singles ===
- Dhillon also credited as songwriter unless otherwise noted.

Title	Year	Peak chart positions			Music	Label	Album
Title	Year	NZ Hot	UK Asian	UK Punjabi	Music	Label	Album
"Chan Milondi"	2018	—	—	—	Harz Aeden	Prem Dhillon	
"Patt Tenu"	2018	—	—	—	Jay K	Lokdhun Punjabi	Mr & Mrs 420 Returns (soundtrack)
"Positive Jatt"	2019	—	—	—	Dope Peppz	Dope Peppz	
"Bootcut"	2019	—	—		San B	Sidhu Moose Wala	
"Old Skool" (featuring Nseeb and Sidhu Moose Wala)	2020	—	19		The Kidd	Sidhu Moose Wala	
"Jatt Hunde Aa"	2020	—	—		San B	Sidhu Moose Wala	
"Badmashi"	2020	—	—		San B	Prem Dhillon	
"Liv In" (featuring Barbie Maan)	2020	—	30	—	The Kidd	Sidhu Moose Wala	
"Majha Block"	2020	—	—		San B	Sidhu Moose Wala	
"Just a Dream"	2021	—	—		Opi Music Lyrics: Jagjit	Sidhu Moose Wala	
"Seen from Far"	2021	—	—	—	Gill Saab	Prem Dhillon	
"Lost Love"	2021	—	—		Ikky Music	Thug Life Records	
"Copyright"	2021	—	—		Snappy	Speed Records	
"Parahune" (with Amrit Maan)	2021	—	—	7	San B	Sidhu Moose Wala	
"Behind Barz"	2021	—	—	—	Opi Music	5911 Records	
"Mere Wala Jatt"	2021	—	—		San B	Speed Records	
"Shah Ji"	2021	—	19	—	Snappy	Prem Dhillon	
"Moon Bound"	2021	—	—		Opi Music Lyrics:Bir Singh	Prem Dhillon	
"G Loss"	2021	—	—		Snappy	Prem Dhillon	
"U Next"	2021	—	—		San B	Prem Dhillon	
"All Aces" (with Blamo featuring TOI)	2022	—	27		Byg Byrd	Prem Dhillon	
"Dreams Unfold"	2022	—	38	18	Opi Music Lyrics: Jagjit	Melody House	
"Blackia"	2022	—	—		San B	Prem Dhillon	
"Wait & Watch"	2022	—	—		Desi Crew	Times Music	Babbar (soundtrack)
"Mob n Love"	2022	—	—		Opi Music	Prem Dhillon	
"Blame"	2022	—	—		San B	T series	
"Ain't Died in Vain"	2022	—	—		Snappy	Prem Dhillon	
"OG"	2022	27	27	20	San B	Prem Dhillon	No Lookin' Back
"26 Blvd"	2022	33	34	—	San B	Prem Dhillon	No Lookin' Back
"Nah They Can't"	2022	34	35	—	Snappy	Prem Dhillon	No Lookin' Back
"Never Again"	2022	—	—	—	Snappy	Prem Dhillon	No Lookin' Back
"Move On"	2022	—	—	—	Inder	Prem Dhillon	Archives
"Stargaze"	2022	—	—	—	Opi Music	Prem Dhillon	Archives
"Let Go"	2022	—	—	—	ProdGK	Prem Dhillon	Archives
"Baba Garja Ji Baba Botta Ji (Vaar)"	2023	—	—	—	Snappy	Prem Dhillon	
"Damn Daddy"	2024	33	—	—	RASS	Prem Dhillon	
"BHAU"	2024	—	—	—	Snappy	Prem Dhillon	
"Can't Be Us" (with Sudesh Kumari and the Kidd)	2025	17	—	—		Prem Dhillon	

=== Film soundtracks ===
Film	Year	Title	Music	Label
Mr & Mrs 420 Returns	2018	Patt Tenu	Jassi Katyal	Lokdhun
Babbar	2022	Wait & Watch	Desi Crew	Bamb Beats
