= Kaka Ji =

- Theatrical release poster
- Directed by: Mandeep Benipal
- Written by: Gill Raunta
- Screenplay by: Gurpreet Bhalla; Gill Raunta
- Produced by: Ravneet Kaur Chahal; Rajesh Kumar
- Starring: Dev Kharoud; Aarushi Sharma; Jagjeet Sandhu
- Cinematography: AKN Sebastian
- Edited by: Omkarnath Bhakri
- Music by: Gurmeet Singh
- Production company: Dreamreality Movies
- Distributed by: White Hill Studios
- Release date: 18 January 2019 (India)
- Running time: 124 minutes
- Country: India
- Language: Punjabi
- Box office: ₹9 crore

Kaka Ji: Son of Royal Sardar is a 2019 Indian-Punjabi drama film written by Gill Raunta and directed by Mandeep Benipal. The Associate director was Vinod Kumar. Produced by Dreamreality Movies and Ravneet Chahal, it stars Dev Kharoud, Aarushi Sharma, and Jagjeet Sandhu in lead roles. In the film a young man rethinks his involvement in a gang after falling in love. The film was released worldwide on 18 January 2019.

== Plot ==
Kaka ji A man decides to rethink his decision of joining a gang after he falls in love with a girl

== Cast ==
- Dev Kharoud
- Aarushi Sharma
- Jagjeet Sandhu
- Dheeraj Kumar
- Lucky Dhaliwal
- Anita Meeta
- Parkash Gadhu
- Gurmeet Saajan

== Soundtrack ==
Kaka Ji

Soundtrack album by Laddi Gill
- Released: 22 January 2019
- Recorded: 2019
- Genre: Feature film soundtrack
- Length: 17:13
- Language: Hindi
- Labels: White Hill Music & Entertainment Private Limited
External audio
- Audio Jukebox on YouTube

Soundtrack of the film is composed by Laddi Gill, Gurmeet Singh and Ikwinder Singh.

Track listing
No.	Title	Lyrics	Music	Singer(s)	Length
1.	"Kaka Ji (Title Track)"	Amar Kavi	Laddi Gill	Gurnam Bhullar	3:14
2.	"America Vs Korea"	Gill Raunta	Laddi Gill	Rajive Jawanda & Gurlez Akhtar	2:39
3.	"Dhokha"	Gill Raunta	Gurmeet Singh	Himmat Sandhu	3:44
4.	"Tu MIlea"	Amar Kavi	Gurmeet Singh	Prabh Gill & Mannat Noor	3:09
5.	"Coat Pant"	Amar Kavi	Ikwinder Singh	Harman Gill	4:26
Total length:					17:13

== Reception ==
Gurleen of Ghaint Punjab wrote, "This Kakaji was a major disappointment!". Dixit Bhargav of Punjabi Mania wrote, "The best part about the movie was its music. Had it not been a movie, it would have unequivocally been a successful music album.". Shubham Bahukhandi of Dekh News wrote, "You all can watch the Punjabi movie Kaka Ji for sure and we think that you all are going to love it. Also, the production and the directional work is really nice in the film and we think that the viewers are going to appreciate this film for sure." Jasmine Singh of The Tribune wrote, "In fact, KakaJi is a film that has uselessly stretched comic scenes that after a point they are unbearable, what was on director’s mind when he was shooting those scenes."
