= Once Upon a Time in Amritsar =

Once Upon A Time In Amritsar
- Directed by: Harjit Singh Ricky
- Screenplay by: Harjit Singh Ricky
- Story by: Gurjind Maan
- Produced by: Mohit Banwait
- Starring: Dilpreet Dhillon; Gurjind Maan; Tanvi Nagi; Sonia Kaur; Pavan Malhotra; Arun Bali; B.N. Sharma
- Cinematography: Shivtar Shiv; Prakash Biswas; Raj Irani
- Edited by: Just Right Studioz
- Music by: Desi Crew; Daljit Singh; Pavneet Birgi; Gold Boy; Gurcharan Singh; Arvinder Singh
- Production companies: Banwait Film; Cine Vision Films
- Release date: 10 June 2016
- Running time: 114 minutes
- Country: India
- Language: Punjabi

Once Upon A Time In Amritsar is a 2016 Indian Punjabi-language film directed by Harjit Singh Ricky, written by Mohit Banwait and starring Dilpreet Dhillon, Gurjind Maan, Tanvi Nagi and Sonia Kaur as the main cast of the film. This film was set to be released worldwide on 10 June 2016.

== Plot ==
This is a story of two college boys, Ranjeet (Dilpreet Dhillon) and Gurtej (Gurjind Maan), who want to finish their school, get a job, and make their families happy. However, they have to encounter some obstacles during the time.

It starts with a man getting off a train and walking down the streets. Later that day, he has been followed by some men who then kill him and burn his body to erase evidences. Police find the body and try to investigate it.

Ranjeet lives with his parents and they are about to go to pick up his uncle. His uncle has been in jail for he feels he owes his life to his brother (Ranjeet's father) who saved his lifelong time ago. The plot is set back to the time when Ranjeet's father argues with someone from the village then his brother tries to settle it. Upset by his meddling, the villager takes out his gun and points it at him. Ranjeet's father saves him by knocking him down with a spade. However, he does it too hard that the man dies. Panicked by the situation, his brother tells him not to reveal the truth to anyone, instead he will take the blame. The police puts him in jail. Released from the jail, the uncle lives at his house.

Gurtej also lives with his family. He has one sister, Deepi (Shveta Grover), and falls in love with his neighbor, a mute girl (Sonia Kaur). Aside from studying, sometimes he sings chorus to back up singers to earn some money. He and Ranjeet are college and best friends. Ranjeet likes a girl from the college (Tanvi Nagi). Sometimes they hang out with their college friends.

When night comes that day, Ranjeet makes his parents and uncle worried by turning home late. His father is furious about it but his mother tries to console him. Gurtej gets home finding his father and sister look sad. They just lost their tractor due to the loan they cannot yet pay. Gurtej consoles his father to put down his worries because soon he will find a job and buy him a new tractor.

The next morning, Ranjeet eats his breakfast before he goes to school. His father tries to settle their argument the previous night by telling him that if he needs anything, just simply ask. He is surprised by his father's changed behavior and thanks his mother for that. His uncle is amazed by how caring his mother is to his father. His mother tells him that it is a wife's commitment to serve her husband as her expression of love to him.
Finally, the day comes when Ranjeet and Gurtej pass the test and graduate. They try to find a job but it fails because the vacancy is no longer available for them who have no connections or money. Gurtej defends themselves by saying they have talents. Nevertheless, they are still turned down. At night, he is preoccupied with the thoughts that his father notices it and it saddens him.

The morning after, he tells Ranjeet how his hope of making his parents happy and getting his sister married vanishes just like that. Suddenly, Deepi comes in a hurry sadly tells him something happens with their father. Rushing back to their village, they find that their father has died.

Surrendering their fate into God's hands, Ranjeet and Gurtej decide to pray in Harmandir Shahib. They ask God to lead them into His path. On their way out, they bump into an elderly man who accidentally slips on his way down the stairs. Ranjeet helps him by holding his arm. He notices that the man may be carrying some kind of talisman. Troubled by the thought, he tells Gurtej about it. Gurtej advises him to stop thinking about it. He tries to let it go but he sees the man again from afar. Led by his conviction that the man is not a "pure" Sikh, he asks Gurtej to come with him to a police office. He tries to explain it to the chief but the chief refuses to proceed it for an investigation. He tells them to get out of the room. They go home feeling disappointed.

The next day, when Ranjeet walks alone, he bumps into a man and the man drops a paper. When the man looks at Ranjeet, he recognizes him as the one he saw at Harmandir Shahib. He directly picks up his stuff and walks away from Ranjeet. Realizing the paper is not his, Ranjeet follows the man to return the paper but he has gone. He carries it home. The man then follows Ranjeet home. At night, two men try to burgle Ranjeet's house to steal the paper but they get nothing for Ranjeet catches them before they succeed.
The next morning, he meets Gurtej to discuss about the paper. They both are convinced there is something fishy behind the blank paper. Mysterious phone calls are addressed to Ranjeet to hand in the paper. They decide to meet the person on the other line. Unfortunately, his identity remains hidden. Instead, he sends a woman to pick up the paper. Ranjeet follows her to get some information about who sends her. She persistently keeps it and accidentally dies falling from a rooftop when defending herself. A motorcycle gets near her dead body and the rider directly takes the paper from her hand.
Shocked by what happens, Ranjeet and Gurtej try to chase the rider. When confronted with him, they try to take back the paper and unmask him, but in the end he runs away. The man calls again and threatens Ranjeet that he makes a mistake and the consequence will be severe. He insists him handing back the paper to a man he will send. At the spot, Ranjeet meets the man while Gurtej is hanging a holed paint can on the car tailpipe so that it will leave mark on the streets for them to easy to track to where the car stops. They follow the car and it stops in front of an abandoned building. The curiosity leads them to discover that as soon as the paper is dipped in silver nitrate, it reveals a plan of terrorist bombing in Harmandir Shahib. They directly go out to call the police. However, by the time they come back, the men (the bombers) and all the evidence are already gone. Unconvinced by their report, the police leave the building, and again, they are disappointed. They decide they will solve the case by themselves.
By the day of the bombing plan, they go to Harmandir Shahib and try to trace all signs that can lead them to find the hidden bombs. This is not easy as Harmandir Shahib is full of devotees and they do not want to draw any attention. Finally, with all the struggle, they can find all the bombs. They are confronted by the bombers but in the end they win and kill them all. As they try to bring the bombs to safest places, the police arrive at the scene and mistakenly suspect them as the bombers. They are shot to dead. The news directly spreads across the city and it affects their whole families and friends with shock and tears.

When shown the dead bodies of the bombers, Gurtej, and Ranjeet at the coroner, the police chief recognizes Ranjeet and Gurtej. He is certain that Gurtej and Ranjeet are innocent, but he needs evidence to prove it. He is also certain that there are six bombers, not five, but he is clueless where to find the other bomber. Luckily, Ranjeet and Gurtej's friend calls him and shows him where they keep the other bomber for investigating the case. He directly takes the bomber to the police office for interrogation. The bomber eventually admits all their plans to bomb Harmandir Shahib. The finding releases him of all doubt that Gurtej and Ranjeet are truly innocent who tried to save Harmandir Shahib and the devotees at that time.

He directly holds a press conference to clarify the false accusation addressed to Ranjeet and Gurtej. He mentions that they both are heroes who by their faith, risk their lives to save people and Harmandir Shahib, their worship place. People in their village hold cremation ceremony to honor them and their families for their dedication and courage.

== Cast ==
- Dilpreet Dhillon
- Gurjind Maan
- Tanvi Nagi
- Sonia Kaur
- Pawan Malhotra
- Arun Bali
- B.N. Sharma
- Shavinder Mahal
- Prince KJ Singh
- Dolly Minhas
- Asish Duggal
- Amritpal Chotu

== Track list ==
S. No.	Track	Singer	Lyrics	Music
1.	"Munda Ambarsariya"	Happy Raikoti	Happy Raikoti	Pavneet Birgi
2.	"Viah"	Ninja	Dharambir Bhangu	GoldBoy
3.	"End Jattiye"	Dilpreet Dhillon	Happy Raikoti	Desi Crew
4.	"Main Amritsar"	Nachhatar Gill	Raj Kakra	Gurcharan Singh
5.	"Tere Seene Vich"	Feroz Khan	Gurjind Maan	Desi Crew
6.	"Tak Tak Roop Tera"	Javed Ali	Dharambir Bhangu, Gurjind Maan, Raj Kakra, Happy Raikoti	Desi Crew
7.	"Dinanath"	Arvinder Singh	Raj Kakra, Gurjind Maan, Dharambir Bhangu, Happy Raikoti	Desi Crew
