= Rabb Da Radio 2 =

2019 Indian Punjabi-language film

- Theatrical release poster
- Directed by: Sharan Art
- Written by: Jass Grewal
- Screenplay by: Jass Grewal
- Story by: Jass Grewal
- Produced by: Manpreet Johal; Ashu Munish Sahni
- Starring: Tarsem Jassar; Simi Chahal; B.N. Sharma; Nirmal Rishi; Jagjeet Sandhu
- Cinematography: Jaype Singh
- Edited by: Tarun Chouhan
- Music by: Jaidev Kumar
- Production company: Vehli Janta Films
- Distributed by: Omjee Group
- Release date: 29 March 2019
- Running time: 129 minutes
- Country: India
- Language: Punjabi

Rabb Da Radio 2 (transl. God's Own Radio 2) is a 2019 Indian-Punjabi Family-Drama film directed by Sharan Art, produced by Manpreet Johal & Ashu Munish Sahni and distributed by Omjee Star. It is a direct sequel to Rabb Da Radio (2017). The film stars Tarsem Jassar and Simi Chahal in lead roles. In the film, a newly married man returns home and is saddened to learn his extended family has fractured. The film also stars B.N. Sharma, Nirmal Rishi, Jagjeet Sandhu, and Tania in supporting roles. The film won the 67th National Film Award for Best Feature Film in Punjabi.

The film was announced by Vehli Janta Films in September 2018. Also, the film was written by Jass Grewal, who wrote the prequel. Earlier the film was supposed to be directed by Harry Bhatti but was later replaced by Sharan Art due to his busy schedule. The filming took place in Khamano in November and December 2018. The additional songs were shot in January 2019. Also, it became the first Punjabi sequel to continue the story.

The film was released worldwide on 29 March 2019 and is presently available for streaming on the Chaupal OTT platform.

== Premise ==
When Manjinder Singh takes his newly wedded wife Guddi to his maternal home, he is heartbroken to realize that things are not what they used to be 16 years back. Once a close-knit family of his four maternal uncles now had walls not only between their houses but within their hearts as well.

== Cast ==
- Tarsem Jassar as Manjinder Singh
- Simi Chahal as Guddi
- B.N. Sharma as Mistri Mama
- Nirmal Rishi as Bebe Hardev Kaur
- Jagjeet Sandhu as Jaggi
- Avtar Gill as mama
- Harby Sangha as Manga
- Gurpreet Bhangu as Manjinder's aunt
- Shivendra Mahal as Manjinder's father
- Sunita Dhir as Manjinder's mother
- Tania as Manjinder's cousin sister
- Baljinder Kaur as mami
- Wamiqa Gabbi guest appearance
- Raghveer Boli as Special Appearance
- Ranjit Bawa as Special Appearance
- Parminder Gill (in Punjabi)

== Production ==
=== Development ===
I[Tarsem Jassar] had started my acting journey with Rabb Da Radio, and this film has always been very special to me. This not only evolved me as an actor only but as a person also. Being a part of the sequel of Rabb da Radio I am very excited and it feels like coming home. I hope we will be able to live up to audiences’ expectations.

— Tarsem Jassar, lead actor

The prequel of the film was directed by Harry Bhatti and Taranvir Singh Jagpal also they won "Best Director Critics Award" at Filmfare Punjabi Awards. While the sequel is directed by Sharan Art and it marks their debut. In an interview, Bhatti disclosed he is not directing the film because he was busy in Do Dooni Panj and the film goes on floors earlier. The story and screenplay of the film is penned by Jass Grewal who won two Awards at Filmfare Awards for the prequel. The film will continue the prequel while most of the Punjabi sequels not. Producers said, "We always try to promote good content. Producing the sequel of a classic film like Rabb Da Radio is very risky, but as always we are confident about our product and concept. Now, we just wish audiences will accept this with open arms."

=== Casting ===
Most of the cast in the film is repeating from the prequel. Tarsem Jassar and Simi Chahal are playing the roles of Manjinder and Guddi respectively. Chahal said, "Guddi is one character which has not only helped evolve me as an actor but as a person also. So, I am excited to play it again. This time she is more mature but retaining her same old innocence. I just hope Rabb Da Radio 2 will also be able to mark its place in everyone’s heart." For the prequel Jassar won the award for Best Debut while Chahal was nominated for Best Actress. The film also stars B.N. Sharma, Jagjeet Sandhu, Nirmal Rishi, Avtar Gill, Harby Sangha, Gurpreet Bhangu, Shivandra Kajal, Sunita Dhir, Tania and more in supporting roles.

=== Filming ===
The principal photography of the film began in November 2018 at village Khamano, Punjab and wrapped on 8 January 2019. While song videos were shot in late January.

== Soundtrack ==
The soundtrack of the film is composed by Desi Crew, R. Guru and Nick Dhammu whereas background music is composed by Jaidev Kumar. Also features the vocals of Sharry Mann, Ranjit Bawa, Nimrat Khaira, Kulbir Jhinjer, and Tarsem Jassar whereas lyrics are penned by Narinder Batth, and Tarsem Jassar. The music of the film is released by Vehli Janta Records.

Sr. No.	Title	Lyricist	Music	Singer
1	"Jattan De Munde"	Tarsem Jassar & Narinder Batth	Desi Crew	Tarsem Jassar & Nimrat Khaira
2	"Shokeen"	Tarsem Jassar	Desi Crew	Tarsem Jassar
3	"Tappe"	Narinder Batth	Desi Crew	Ranjit Bawa ft. Gurlez Akhtar
4	"Channan"	Tarsem Jassar	Desi Crew	Nimrat Khaira
5	"Guddi Da Parahuna"	Narinder Batth	Desi Crew	Kulbir Jhinjer
6	"Kisse Mere Yaar De"	Tarsem Jassar	R Guru	Tarsem Jassar

== Release ==
Rabb Da Radio 2 was released worldwide on 29 March 2019 and distributed by OmJee Group and Vehli Janta Films.

The film was announced by Vehli Janta Films in September 2018. The official teaser of the film was released on 10 February 2019 by Vehli Janta Films on YouTube and shows it would continue the prequel's story. The first song[Promotional] "Jattan De Munde" from the film sung by Tarsem Jassar and Nimrat Khaira was released on 27 February 2019. The official trailer of the film was released by Vehli Janta on 8 March 2019 at YouTube. Later, songs "Shokeen", and "Tappe" sung by Jassar, Ranjit Bawa, and Gurlez Akhtar were released.

== Sequel ==
Rabb Da Radio 3, the third installment of the film series, was released on April 3, 2026, and emerged as a commercial hit.
