= Sufna =

Indian Punjabi-language romantic drama film

- Theatrical release poster
- Directed by: Jagdeep Sidhu
- Screenplay by: Jagdeep Sidhu
- Produced by: Navneet Virk; Gurpreet Singh
- Starring: Ammy Virk; Tania; Jagjeet Sandhu
- Cinematography: Vineet Malhotra
- Edited by: Manish More
- Music by: B Praak
- Production company: Panj Paani Films
- Distributed by: Reliance Entertainment
- Release date: 14 February 2020 (India)
- Running time: 144 Minutes
- Country: India
- Language: Punjabi
- Box office: est. ₹19.35 crore (US$2.0 million)

Sufna (transl. Dream) is a 2020 Indian Punjabi-language romantic drama film written and directed by Jagdeep Sidhu. Produced by Panj Paani Films, it stars Ammy Virk and Tania. The film chronicles the story of a young man who falls in love with a cotton picker who arrives in his village. Sufna has Jagjeet Sandhu, Jasmin Bajwa and Seema Kaushal in supporting roles. This marked the feature film debut for Tania as a lead actress. The film was released on 14 February 2020 in India. The soundtrack of the film is produced by B Praak and songs are written and composed by Jaani.

== Plot ==
Teg (Tania) lives with her father's older brother, Taya and Taayi (aunt). Her mother was a Muslim and she died when Teg was young. Her father was part of the army and her family says that he is lost. Teg believes that her father, whom she dearly calls Phauji, is still alive and he will come back home one day. Jeet is a carefree and irresponsible boy. His father committed suicide because he couldn't pay off his debt. Jeet falls in love with Teg when she comes to pick cotton in their village. Teg encourages Jeet to study, so he can become something in life and pay off the debts of his father. When Teg come back to Jeet's village after 13 months, she finds out that Jeet went away to a hostel for higher studies, and is now in college. He has a female friend there, Tasveer. She becomes really happy that he listened to her. Jeet comes and meets Teg secretly.

Later that year, she tells Jeet that she cannot meet him anymore because she is engaged now and she gives him her mother's jewelry to pay for the expenses of job applications. Jeet tells Kulwinder, who is marrying Teg, that Teg has a bad character in order to scare him off, but later on confesses that he loves her. Teg's fiancé says that he would help them.

Instead of helping them, he tells Teg's Taayi that she has been secretly meeting with Jeet. Teg is about to get married, but she runs away to a house she used to work at and hides there and waits for Jeet to come. Jeet comes and finds her unconscious. Later, they go back to her Taayi's house. She tells her uncle that they raised her so they have the right to wed her to anyone. Teg confesses that her Taayi may have treated her badly, but she gave her food and roof to live under. Teg tells her aunt that she has found her Phauji and that her father was in the army all this time. She also requests that her Taayi marry her off to Jeet. Her taayi realises her mistakes and they get her married to Jeet. A couple of months later, Jeet comes back since he is now in the army.

== Cast ==
- Ammy Virk as Jagjeet
- Tania as Teg
- Jasmin Bajwa as Tasveer
- Jagjeet Sandhu as Tarsem
- Seema Kaushal as Teg's Taayi
- Kaka Kautki as Gamdoor
- Mohini Toor as Gamdoor's wife
- Lakha Lehri as Teg's Taaya
- Balwinder Bullet as Bagga
- Rabab Kaur as child Teg
- Mintu Kapa as Kulwinder, Teg's fiancé
- Harjinder Singh Sran Tarsem friend
- Karamjit Anmol as special appearance as Kulwinder

== Production ==
Jagdeep Sidhu started writing the film in July 2019. Sidhu on social media disclosed that the film was inspired from Gurnaam Bhullar's song "Paagal" whereas the cotton fields backdrop was inspired from Brazilian film Behind the Sun. Principal photography of the film began on 16 October 2019 and was wrapped up on 19 December 2019. Tania visited the village before principal photography began to get into her character. The film marked the debut for her as a lead actress. During editing, several scenes from the film were cut out, Sidhu on social media disclosed he missed a few deleted scenes.

== Soundtrack ==
Sufna

Soundtrack album by B Praak
- Released: 18 February 2020
- Recorded: 2019
- Genre: Feature film soundtrack
- Length: 21:37
- Language: Punjabi
- Labels: Speed Records; Times Music

B Praak chronology
Qismat (2018)	Sufna (2020)	Qismat 2 (2021)

Sufna's soundtrack was composed by Indian music producer and singer B Praak; the lyrics were penned by Jaani. The album consists of six songs which were primarily recorded by Praak and Virk, except tracks "Qabool A", which was sung by Hashmat Sultana and "Ammi", which was sung by Kamal Khan.

The complete soundtrack was released under the label of Times Music on iTunes on 18 February 2020. The album was also made available for digital download on Google Play in the same month. Critical response to the music was positive; Manpriya Singh of The Tribune said, "music by B Praak consists of five numbers that lend to the story the warm fuzzy feeling of love and not take away from it [...] the songs, like the script, tug at your heartstrings". The songs "Qabool A" and "Jannat" also peaked on Asian Music chart by Official Charts Company. Upon the film's digital release, "Jannat" entered top 10 in the chart.

=== Track list ===
No.	Title	Lyrics	Music	Singer(s)	Length
1.	"Qabool A"	Jaani	B Praak	Hashmat Sultana	03:19
2.	"Jaan Deyan Ge"	Jaani	B Praak	Ammy Virk	03:49
3.	"Channa Ve"	Jaani	B Praak	B Praak	02:54
4.	"Ammi"	Jaani	B Praak	Kamal Khan	04:49
5.	"Jannat"	Jaani	B Praak	B Praak	03:26
6.	"Shukriya"	Jaani	B Praak	B Praak	03:20
Total length:					21:37

== Release ==
The film was released on 14 February 2020 on the occasion of Valentine's Day. The first song 'Qabool A' from the film was released on 14 January 2020.

== Home video ==
The film was made available to stream on Amazon Prime Video since 10 April 2020.

== Reception ==
=== Box office ===
Sufna became commercial success upon its release. In its opening weekend, Sufna grossed ₹46.68 lacs in United States, ₹1.94 crore in Canada, ₹38.87 lacs in United Kingdom, ₹37.26 lacs in Australia, and ₹11.44 lacs in New Zealand. After 10 days of its release, the film grossed ₹1.26 crore in United States, ₹5.17 crore in Canada, ₹80.56 lacs in United Kingdom, ₹96.02 lacs in Australia, and ₹25.81 lacs in New Zealand. The film has collected ₹21.74 Crore Worldwide.

=== Critical reception ===
Manpriya Singh of The Tribune gave three and a half stars out of five. Sukhpreet Kahlon of Cinestaan gave three stars out of four.
