= Tarsem Jassar =

Indian singer-rapper and actor

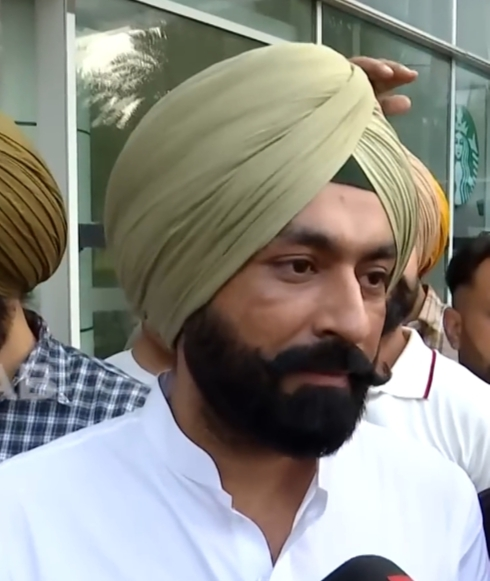
- Jassar in 2024

Background information
- Born: 4 July 1986 (age 40); Jassar, Ludhiana, Punjab, India
- Origin: Punjab, India
- Genres: Pop; Folk; R&B; Hip-hop
- Occupations: Singer; rapper; songwriter; actor
- Instrument: Vocals
- Years active: 2012–present
- Label: Vehli Janta Records
- Member of: Vehli Janta
- Members: Kulbir Jhinjer

Tarsem Singh Jassar (born 4 July 1986) is an Indian singer, rapper, songwriter and actor associated with Punjabi films and music. He is well known for his work in films Rabb Da Radio and Rabb Da Radio 2. Jassar along with his label mate Kulbir Jhinjer launched their own label 'Vehli Janta Records' in 2013.

== Early life ==
Jassar was born on 4 July 1986 in the village of Jassar in Ludhiana district of Punjab.

== Discography ==
=== Studio albums ===
List of albums, with release date, label and selected chart positions
Title	Album details	Music
Illuminati	Released: 2016; Label: Vehli Janta Records; Format: Digital download, streaming	R Guru
Turbanator	Released: 2018; Label: Vehli Janta Records; Format: Digital download, streaming	R Guru; Western Pendu; Sukh-E Musical Doctorz; Tigerstyle
My Pride	Released: 2020; Label: Vehli Janta Records; Format: Digital download, streaming	Pendu Boyz; Gill Saab; Mix Singh; Byg Byrd; Hiten; Pav Dharia
New Order	Released: 2024; Label: Vehli Janta Records; Format: Digital download, streaming	R Guru; Byg Byrd; Wazir Patar; Mix Singh; Mr Rubal

=== Extended plays ===
List of EPs, with release date, label and selected chart positions
Title	EP details
DeFcoN.1	Music: Wazir Patar; Released: 15 February 2022; Label: Vehli Janta; Format: Digital download, streaming
Enigma (with Wazir Patar)	Music: Wazir Patar; Released: 22 November 2022; Label: Vehli Janta; Format: Digital download, streaming
4 Shots (with Wazir Patar)	Music: Wazir Patar; Released: 29 June 2025; Label: Vehli Janta; Format: Digital download, streaming

== Singles discography ==
=== As lead artist ===
Song	Year	Music	Label	Album
Attwadi	2014	R Guru	Vehli Janta Records	
Galwakdi	2016	R Guru	Vehli Janta Records	
Aunda Sardar	2016	Deep Jandu	Vehli Janta Records	
Sarbansdani (with Kulbir Jhinjer)	2016	R Guru	Vehli Janta Records	
Creez	2016	R Guru	Vehli Janta Records	Illuminati
Over Under	2016	R Guru	Vehli Janta Records	Illuminati
Asool	2016	R Guru	Vehli Janta Records	Illuminati
Kundi Muchh	2016	R Guru	Vehli Janta Records	Illuminati
Ghaint Bande	2016	R Guru	Vehli Janta Records	Illuminati
Bas Yaara Lai	2016	R Guru	Vehli Janta Records	Illuminati
Illuminati	2016	R Guru	Vehli Janta Records	Illuminati
Fit Fit	2016	R Guru	Vehli Janta Records	Illuminati
Mardan Di Shaan	2016	R Guru	Vehli Janta Records	Illuminati
Sardara	2017	Deep Jandu	White Hill Music	Rabb Da Radio soundtrack
Tere Bajhon	2017	R Guru	White Hill Music	Rabb Da Radio soundtrack
Rehmat	2017	R Guru	White Hill Music	Rabb Da Radio soundtrack
Karvai	2017	Deep Jandu	Vehli Janta Records	
Yarri	2017	R Guru	White Hill Music	Sardar Mohammad
Sardar Mohammad	2017	R Guru	White Hill Music	Sardar Mohammad
Chittiayaan	2017	R Guru	White Hill Music	Sardar Mohammad
Single Double	2017	R Guru	White Hill Music	Sardar Mohammad
Geet De Wargi	2018	Deep Jandu	Vehli Janta Records	
Daana Paani	2018	R Guru	Rhythm Boyz Entertainment	Daana Paani soundtrack
Hero / Challenge Hero	2018	R Guru	Vehli Janta Records	
Countrysiders	2018	Western Penduz	Vehli Janta Records	Turbanator
Humble	2018	R Guru	Vehli Janta Records	Turbanator
Big Shot	2018	R Guru	Vehli Janta Records	Turbanator
Ik Do Gazlan	2018	R Guru	Vehli Janta Records	Turbanator
Stone Jade Nau Te	2018	Tigerstyle	Vehli Janta Records	Turbanator
Turbanator	2018	Sukh-E Musical Doctorz	Vehli Janta Records	Turbanator
Khadoos	2018	R Guru	Vehli Janta Records	Turbanator
Brola	2018	Tigerstyle	Vehli Janta Records	Turbanator
Rangle Chubare	2018	R Guru	Vehli Janta Records	Turbanator
Life	2019	Western Penduz	Vehli Janta Records	
Eyes On You	2019	Western Penduz	Vehli Janta Records	
Tera Tera	2019	Western Penduz	Vehli Janta Records	
Jattan De Munde	2019	Desi Crew	Vehli Janta Records	Rabb Da Radio 2 soundtrack
Shokeen	2019	Desi Crew	Vehli Janta Records	Rabb Da Radio 2 soundtrack
Channan	2019	Desi Crew	Vehli Janta Records	Rabb Da Radio 2 soundtrack
Kisse Mere Yaar De	2019	R Guru	Vehli Janta Records	Rabb Da Radio 2 soundtrack
Rebel	2019	Western Penduz	Vehli Janta Records	
Yaaran Nal Chill (with Kulbir Jhinger)	2019	Western Penduz	Vehli Janta Records	
Gedi	2019	Western Penduz	Vehli Janta Records	
Fatehgarh Sahib (with Kulbir Jhinger)	2019	Gill Saab	Vehli Janta Records	
RDX	2020	Gill Saab	Vehli Janta Records	
No Blame	2020	Pendu Boyz	Vehli Janta Records	
My Pride (feat. Fateh DOE)	2020	Pendu Boyz	Vehli Janta Records	My Pride
Bloodline	2020	Byg Byrd	Vehli Janta Records	My Pride
Kajla	2020	Pav Dharia	Vehli Janta Records	My Pride
Yaar Mere (featuring Kulbir Jhinger)	2020	MixSingh	Vehli Janta Records	My Pride
Hustler	2020	MixSingh	Vehli Janta Records	My Pride
Sangdi Sangdi (featuring Nimrat Khaira)	2020	MixSingh	Vehli Janta Records	My Pride
Ronda Wala	2020	MixSingh	Vehli Janta Records	My Pride
Look	2020	Hiten	Vehli Janta Records	My Pride
Muscle Caran (feat. Nseeb)	2020	Gill Saab	Vehli Janta Records	My Pride
Baagian De Kisse (with Kulbir Jhinger)	2020	Beat Inspector	Vehli Janta Records	
Soorme	2021	Beat Inspector	Vehli Janta Records	
Happiness	2021	Mr Rubal	Vehli Janta Records	
Suitan Da Swag	2021	R Guru	Vehli Janta Records	
Kingpin	2021	Wazir Patar	Vehli Janta Records	
Rose Bud (feat. Kiran Sandhu)	2022	Wazir Patar	Vehli Janta Records	Defcon 1 EP
Bullseye	2022	Wazir Patar	Vehli Janta Records	Defcon 1 EP
American Bull	2022	Wazir Patar	Vehli Janta Records	Defcon 1 EP
Yaar Razi	2022	Pav Dharia	Vehli Janta Records	
No Count	2022	Deosi	TPZ Records	
Sach KIthe Ae	2022	Mr Rubal	Vehli Janta Records	
Shareeka (with Ranjit Bawa)	2022	Gurmohh	Gem Tunes Punjabi	'Khaao Piyo Aish Karo' soundtrack
Raza	2022	Mix Singh	Vehli Janta Records	
Wrangler	2022	Deep Jandu	TPZ Records	
6L (featuring Kulbir Jhinjer)	2022	Byg Byrd	Vehli Janta Records	
Arsenal	2022	Wazir Patar	Vehli Janta Records	Enigma EP
Enigma	2022	Wazir Patar	Vehli Janta Records	Enigma EP
Why Black!	2022	Wazir Patar	Vehli Janta Records	Enigma EP
Shehzada (with Amrit Maan & Kulbir Jhinjer)	2023	Mix Singh	Vehli Janta Records	Mastaney soundtrack

=== As featured artist ===
Title	Year	Label	Album
Gedi (Kulbir Jhinger featuring Tarsem Jassar)	2019	Vehli Janta Records	
The Real Men (Gopi Waraich feat. Tarsem Jassar)	2021	Vehli Janta Records	Straight Outta Punjab
Good N Bad (Gopi Waraich feat. Tarsem Jassar)	2021	Vehli Janta Records	Straight Outta Punjab
Deadly Eyes (Gopi Waraich feat. Tarsem Jassar)	2021	Vehli Janta Records	Straight Outta Punjab
To The Warrior (Nseeb featuring Tarsem Jassar)	2021	Nseeb	

== Songwriting discography ==
As lyricist (songwriter)
Title	Year	Artists	Label	Album
College	2013	Kulbir Jhinjer	Speed Records	Vehli Janta
Vehli Janta	2013	Kulbir Jhinjer	Speed Records	Vehli Janta
Punjab	2013	Kulbir Jhinjer	Speed Records	Vehli Janta
Lal Trouser	2014	Kulbir Jhinjer	Vehli Janta Records	Rakhwan Kota
Patiala Shahi Pagg	2014	Kulbir Jhinjer	Vehli Janta Records	Rakhwan Kota
Graribaaj Yaar	2014	Kulbir Jhinjer	Vehli Janta Records	Rakhwan Kota
Dharna	2015	Kulbir Jhinjer	Vehli Janta Records	Sardaarni
Chak Asla	2015	Kulbir Jhinjer	Vehli Janta Records	Sardaarni
Gaza Kid	2021	Gopi Waraich	Vehli Janta Records	Straight Outta Punjab
Punjab Jeha	2022	Wahzir, Kiran Sandhu	Vehli Janta Records	Maa Da Ladla soundtrack

== Filmography ==
Key
†	Denotes films that have not yet been released

Year	Film	Role	Producer	Director	Notes
2017	Rabb Da Radio	Manjinder Singh	Vehli Janta Films	Tarnvir Singh Jagpal and Harry Bhatti	Won Filmfare Award for Best Debut Actor
2017	Sardar Muhammad	Surjeet/Sardar Mohammad	Vehli Janta Films	Harry Bhatti	Screenplay also
2018	Daana Paani	Army Officer (cameo)	Rhythm Boyz Entertainment	Tarnvir Singh Jagpal	Cameo
2018	Afsar	Jaspal Singh	Vehli Janta Films & Nadar Films	Gulshan Singh	
2019	Uda Aida	Gurnam	Friday Russh Motion Pictures, Ksshitij Chaudhary Films, Naresh Kathooria Films	Ksshitij Chaudhary	
2019	Rabb Da Radio 2	Manjinder Singh	Vehli Janta Films & Om Jee Group	Sharan Art	
2022	Galwakdi	Jagteshwar Singh	Vehli Janta Films & Om Jee Group	Sharan Art	
2022	Maa Da Ladla	Gora	Manpreet Johal, Ashu Munish Sahni	Uday Pratap Singh	
2022	Khaao Piyo Aish Karo	Jeeta	Harsimran Singh	Ksshitij Chaudhary	
2023	Mastaney	Zahoor	Vehli Janta Films & Om Jee Group	Sharan Art	
2025	Guru Nanak Jahaz	Mewa Singh Lopoke	Vehli Janta Films	Sharan Art	
2026	Rabb Da Radio 3	Inderjit Singh	Vehli Janta Films	Harry Bhatti	
2026	Dastaar	Harnek Singh	White Hill Studios	Amar Hundal	
