= Shahkot (film) =

2024 film

- Directed by: Rajiv Dhingra
- Produced by: Anirudh Mohta
- Starring: Guru Randhawa; Isha Talwar
- Music by: Guru Randhawa
- Release date: 4 October 2024 (India)
- Running time: 115 minutes
- Country: India
- Language: Punjabi

Shahkot is a 2024 Indian Punjabi-language film directed by Rajiv Dhingra and produced by Anirudh Mohta. It features Guru Randhawa, Isha Talwar, Raj Babbar, and Gurshabad Singh.

== Plot ==
Shahkot chronicles the life of Iqbal Singh and explores the themes of love, family, and the struggles faced by the youth in contemporary Indian society.

== Production ==
Shahkot is directed by Rajiv Dhingra, and produced by Anirudh Mohta. The film was released in India on 4 October 2024.

== Reception ==
Sushmita Dey of Times Now wrote, "While Shahkot excels in its emotional and cultural portrayal, it occasionally leans into predictability. Some plot points may feel familiar to viewers of romantic dramas, but the film's charm lies in its execution and the heartfelt performances of its cast."

The New Indian Express reviewed that "Guru Randhawa makes an assured Punjabi movie debut with a deeply felt, thought-provoking film."
