= Oye Bhole Oye =

2024 Indian Punjabi-language film

- Directed by: Varinder Ramgarhia
- Written by: Gurpreet Bhullar
- Produced by: KV Dhillon; Jagjeet Sandhu
- Starring: Jagjeet Sandhu; Irwin Meet Kaur; Rupinder Rupi; Dheeraj Kumar; Prakash Gadhu
- Cinematography: Sukh Kamboj
- Edited by: Gurjeet King
- Music by: Songs: Manna Singh; Geet; Shemby K; Score: Manna Singh
- Production companies: Geet MP3; Jagjeet Sandhu Films
- Distributed by: Geet MP3
- Release date: 16 February 2024
- Running time: 132 minutes
- Country: India
- Language: Punjabi

Oye Bhole Oye is a 2024 Indian Punjabi film directed by Varinder Ramgarhia and produced by KV Dhillon and Jagjeet Sandhu. It stars Jagjeet Sandhu, Irwin Meet Kaur, Dheeraj Kumar, Prakash Gadhu and Rupinder Rupi. It was scheduled to be released on 15 September 2023 but was postponed to 16 February 2024.

== Plot ==
Bhola's search for employment in the metropolis brings him into contact with the wealthy Aveera, who is attracted to his uncomplicated lifestyle. However, their love affair comes to a halt as Bhola has to rescue his village.

== Cast ==
- Jagjeet Sandhu
- Irwinmeet Kaur
- Dheeraj Kumar
- Parkash Gadhu
- Rupinder Rupi
- Pardeep Cheema
- Jarnail Singh
- Prince Poddar

== Production ==
The first schedule of the film started in April 2023 and wrapped up on 22 May 2023.

== Soundtrack ==
Track listing
No.	Title	Lyrics	Music	Singer(s)	Length
1.	"Oye Bhole Oye (Title Track)"	Kang Sadiq	Manna Singh	Master Saleem	2:14
2.	"Ki Chahida"	Kang Sadiq	Geet	Karan Randhawa, Gurlez Akhtar	2:26
3.	"Burberry"	Kang Sadiq	Geet	Sajjan Adeeb	2:42
4.	"Gabru Da Time"	Veet Baljit	Shemby K	Veet Baljit	3:31
5.	"Jazbaat"	Kang Sadiq	Manna Singh	Bir Singh	2:38
6.	"Sadkaan"	Kang Sadiq	Manna Singh	Bir Singh	3:17
Total length:					16:48

== Release ==
=== Theatrical ===
Oye Bhole Oye was theatrically released on 16 February 2024.

=== Home media ===
The film was made available for streaming on Chaupal starting from 9 May 2024.

== Controversy ==
In Jalandhar, Punjab, a complaint under 295-A was registered against the director and lead actor of film. Christian community leaders stated that a scene from the film hurt the sentiments of Christian people. Later Supreme Court of India grants interim bail to Jagjeet singh Sandhu on charges of insulting religious sentiments by making the movie.

== Sequel ==
A sequel, Oye Bhole Oye 2, directed by Jagjeet Sandhu and written by Gurpreet Bhullar, who also wrote the prequel is scheduled for theatrical release on 12 June 2026.
