= Prince Kanwaljit Singh =

Indian film actor and writer

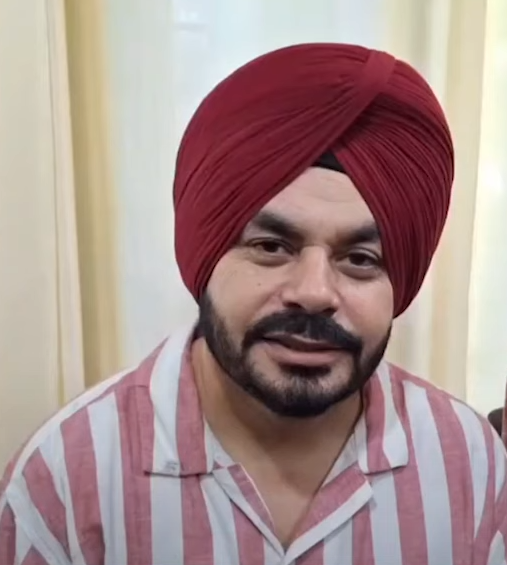
- Singh in 2024
- Born: 3 February 1980 (age 46); Kotkapura, Faridkot, Punjab, India
- Occupations: Actor; Writer; Comedian
- Years active: 2010–present
- Notable work: Panchhi; Warning; Zila Sangrur; Criminal

Comedy career
- Genres: Films; Comedy; Web series

Prince Kanwaljit Singh (born 2 March 1980), commonly known as Prince K.J Singh, is an Indian film actor, dialogue writer and director. He is known for his works in Punjabi cinema. Prince became well-known after receiving plaudits for his performance in the film series Warning.

== Early life and education ==
Kanwaljit was born on 2 March 1980 in Kotkapura, Faridkot, Punjab, India where he did his schooling from Punjab India.

== Career ==
Prince began his career as an actor and now primarily works in the Punjabi cinema, in 2010 he made his acting debut in Sukhmani. Kanawaljit also played a leading role in films Zila Sangrur, Shareek, Warning 2, Panchhi and Warning and in Criminal.

In movies like Yaraan Naal Baharaan 2 (2012), Shareek (2015), Teshan (2016), and Toofan Singh (2017)), he primarily portrayed minor and supporting roles. Jatt Boys Jattan De (2013) was Singh's first feature film as a writer, Leather Life (2015), Teshan (2016), Shadaa (2019), Mitti (2019), Gidarh Singhi (2019), and Ik Sandhu Hunda Si are some of his other films as a writer (2020).

== Filmography ==
Year	Film	Role	Note
2010	Sukhmani		
2010	Ik Kudi Punjab Di		
2010	Chak Jawana	Boota	
2012	Yaraan Naal Baharaan 2		
2013	Sadda Haq	Gopi Singh	
2013	Daddy Cool Munde Fool		
2013	Jatt Boys Putt Jattan De	Jolly	
2015	Leather Life		
2015	Shareek	Bant	
2016	Bathinda Express	Jagga	
2016	Vaisakhi List	Head Constable	
2016	Kaptaan		
2016	Once Upon a Time in Amritsar	Succha Singh	
2016	25 Kille	Bhinda	
2016	Teshan	Chumbak	
2017	Toofan Singh	Chandi	
2017	Nikka Zaildar 2	School Teacher	
2018	Laung Laachi		
2018	Afsar		
2018	Laatu	Ginda Grewal	
2019	Kaake Da Viyah	Bathal	
2019	Shadaa	Chadta's cousin	
2019	Surkhi Bindi	Rana- Sukha's workmate	
2019	Daaka	Constable Beant Singh	
2019	Gidarh Singhi	Chhotu	
2021	Panchhi	Panchhi	Leading role
2021	Zila Sangrur	Pargat	Web series
2021	Warning	Pamma	Leading role
2021	Shava Ni Girdhari Lal		
2022	Munda Sardaran Da		
2022	Maa		
2022	Posti		
2022	Rabba Rabba Meeh Varsa		
2022	Criminal	Bhura	Leading role
2023	Cheta Singh		
2023	Sidhus of Southall	Dead body	
2023	Chamak	Jagga	
	Kali Jotta	Boota	
2024	Warning 2	Pamma	Leading role
2024	Shinda Shinda No Papa		
2025	Akaal: The Unconquered	Dina	

=== Writer ===
Year	Film	Language	Note
2013	Jatt Boys Putt Jattan De	Punjabi	
2015	Leather Life	Punjabi	
2016	Faraar	Punjabi	
2016	Teshan	Punjabi	writer
2017	Ik Sandhu Hunda Si	Punjabi	dialogue
2018	Shikaari	Punjabi	
2021	Zila Sangrur	Punjabi	writer
2021	Warning	Punjabi	dialogue
2022	Rabba Rabba Meeh Varsa	Punjabi	
2024	Sector 17	Punjabi	writer
