= Dilpreet Dhillon =

Indian singer and actor

- Born: Fatehgarh Sahib, Punjab
- Musical career
- Origin: India
- Genres: Folk; R&B; Semi-classical
- Occupations: Singer; actor
- Years active: 2014–present
- Labels: Speed Records; White Hill Music; Humble Music; Saga Music; Times Music

Dilpreet Dhillon, is an Indian singer and actor associated with the Punjabi music and Punjabi film industry. He started his career as a singer, and later debuted as an actor with the film Once Upon A Time In Amritsar (2016).

== Discography ==
=== Studio albums ===
Title	Album details	Songs	Lyrics
8 Kartoos	Released: 2015; Music: Desi Crew; label: Speed Records	Dhillon Da Munda	Bunty Bains
8 Kartoos	Released: 2015; Music: Desi Crew; label: Speed Records	Fire Bolde (with Inder Kaur)	Happy Raikoti
8 Kartoos	Released: 2015; Music: Desi Crew; label: Speed Records	Gulab (with Goldy Desi Crew)	Narinder Batth
8 Kartoos	Released: 2015; Music: Desi Crew; label: Speed Records	Kartoos	Akashdeep Sandhu
8 Kartoos	Released: 2015; Music: Desi Crew; label: Speed Records	Muchh	Narinder Batth
8 Kartoos	Released: 2015; Music: Desi Crew; label: Speed Records	Noonh Bebe Di	Happy Raikoti
8 Kartoos	Released: 2015; Music: Desi Crew; label: Speed Records	Show Match	Narinder Batth
8 Kartoos	Released: 2015; Music: Desi Crew; label: Speed Records	Thar Wala Yaar (feat. Sara Gurpal)	Amrinder Virk
Dushman	Released: 2020; Music: Desi Crew; label: Speed Records	Kabza	Narinder Batth
Dushman	Released: 2020; Music: Desi Crew; label: Speed Records	Chandigarh (with Gurlez Akhtar)	Narinder Batth
Dushman	Released: 2020; Music: Desi Crew; label: Speed Records	Mucch	Narinder Batth
Dushman	Released: 2020; Music: Desi Crew; label: Speed Records	Dushman	Narinder Batth
Dushman	Released: 2020; Music: Desi Crew; label: Speed Records	Akdaan (with Gurlez Akhtar)	Narinder Batth
Dushman	Released: 2020; Music: Desi Crew; label: Speed Records	Velly Jatt	Narinder Batth
Next Chapter	Released: 2021; Music: Desi Crew; label: Speed Records		Narinder Batth

== Singles discography ==
Song	Year	Music	Peak chart position				Lyrics	Label	Album
Song	Year	Music	CAN	NZ Hot	UK Asian	UK Punjabi	Lyrics	Label	Album
Gunday No. 1	2014	Desi Crew	—				Narinder Batth	Speed Records	
32 Bore	2014	Goldboy	—					Speed Records	
Gunday Returns	2015	Desi Crew	—				Happy Raikoti	Speed Records	
Muchh	2015	Desi Crew					Narinder Batth	Speed Records	8 Kartoos
Shreaam Apni	2016	Desi Crew					Akashdeep Sandhu	Speed Records	
Raah Jandi	2017	Desi Crew	—				Narinder Batth, Raman Sidhu	Desi Crew	
Wang	2017	Desi Crew	—				Satta	Speed Records	
Yaaran De Group	2017	Desi Crew					Narinder Batth	Speed Records	
Sade Munde Da Viah (with Goldy Desi Crew)	2017	Desi Crew	—		12		Jaggi Sanghera	Speed Records	
Chill Mode	2018	Deep Jandu					Happy Raikoti	Humble Music	
Gunday Ik Vaar Fer (with Baani Sandhu)	2018	Western Punduz	—				Jassi Lohka, Lagi Jhinjher	Humble Music	
Red Rose	2018	Deep Jandu	—				Gill Duggan Wala	Speed Records	
Yaar Graribaaz (featuring Karan Aujla & Shree Brar)	2018	Desi Crew	—				Shree Brar	Saga Music	
Picka	2018	Desi Crew	—				Sandhu Saiyanwala	Saga Music	
Rangle Duppate	2019	Desi Crew	—				Narinder Batth	Speed Records	
Pegg Paa (with Gaggi Dhillon)	2019	Desi Crew	—				Gaagi Dhillon, Dilpreet Dhillon	VS RECORDS	
Veham	2019	Desi Crew	—				Narinder Batth	Speed Records	
Dilpreet Dhillon Is Back (with Gurlez Akhtar)	2020	Desi Crew	—				Narinder Batth	Speed Records	
25 Ghante (with Gurlez Akhtar)	2020	Desi Crew	—				Narinder Batth	Rich Gang	
Blames (with Gurlez Akhtar)	2020	Desi Crew	—				Rammy Chahal	Humble Music	
Bazaar Band (with DJ Flow)	2020	Dj Flow	—				Narinder Batth	Worldwide Records	
Jatt Te Jawani (featuring Karan Aujla)	2021	Desi Crew	78	32	4	2	Narinder Batth	Speed Records	Next Chapter
Shining Koka (with Mehar Vaani)	2021	Desi Crew	—		14		Mandeep Maavi	Speed Records	Next Chapter
Taur Jattan Di (with Kulbir Jhinger)	2022	Desi Crew	—		21				

== Filmography ==
Year	Movie	Role
2016	Once upon a Time in Amritsar	Ranjeet
2017	The Great Sardaar	Gurjant
2019	Chandigarh Amritsar Chandigarh	Prince
2019	Jaddi Sardar	Jeeta
2022	Saas Meri Ne Munda Jamya	Harmeet
2022	Mera Vyah Kara Do	Ekam
