= Jagjeet Sandhu =

Indian actor (born 1991)

- Born: 8 June 1991 (age 35); Himmatgarh Chhana, Amloh, Fatehgarh Sahib, Punjab, India
- Education: Panjab University
- Occupation: Actor
- Years active: 2014–present
- Website: jagjeetsandhu.com

Jagjeet Sandhu (born 8 june 1991) is an Indian film actor and theatre artist who works in Punjabi and Hindi films and Television. He started his career with the biographic film Rupinder Gandhi in 2015. Sandhu is best known for his role of "Bhola" in the Rupinder Gandhi film series and "Romi Gill" in Dakuaan Da Munda and his role as "Tarsem" in Sufna is considered his best role to date.

== Early life ==
Sandhu was born in 8 June 1991 in the small village of Himmatgarh Chhanna, Fatehgarh district, Punjab, India. He graduated with a degree of Master of Arts in Indian Theatre from Panjab University, Chandigarh.

== Career ==
Sandhu made his debut in Punjabi cinema in 2015, with a supporting role of character "Bhola" in Rupinder Gandhi - The Gangster..?. After that he played the role of "Speed" in Qissa Panjab.

In 2020, Sandhu appeared in a romantic drama Sufna, by Jagdeep Sidhu. His performance was praised by critics. In 2020, he played the character of "Tope Singh" in the Amazon Prime Video streaming series Paatal Lok.

== Filmography ==
=== Films ===
Year	Film	Role	Notes
2015	Rupinder Gandhi - The Gangster..?	Bhola	
2015	Qissa Panjab	Speed	
2016	Anatomy of Violence	Rapist	Hindi debut
2017	Rabb Da Radio	Jaggi	
2017	Rocky Mental	Dahiya	
2017	Rupinder Gandhi 2: The Robinhood	Bhola	Nominated: PTC Award for Best Comic Role
2018	Sajjan Singh Rangroot	Teja Singh	
2018	Dakuan Da Munda	Rommi Gill	
2019	Kaka Ji	Raakat	
2019	Rabb Da Radio 2	Jaggi	
2019	Shadaa	Bagh Singh	
2019	Leila	Rakesh	Digital debut; 4 episodes
2019	Mitti: Virasat Babbaran Di	Babbar Uday Singh	
2019	Unni Ikki	DC	Debut as a lead actor
2020	Sufna	Tarsem	
2020	Taxi No. 24		
2021	Please Kill Me		
2023	Tufang	Mousor Brar	
2024	Oye Bhole Oye	Bhola	
2025	Illti	lead role	Upcoming
2025	Chor Dil	Guri	
2025	The Diplomat	Tahir	Hindi Film
2026	Satluj	SPO Kuljit Singh	

=== Web series ===
Year	Title	Character	Network	Notes
2020	Paatal Lok	Tope Singh	Amazon Prime Video	9 episodes
2022	Escaype Live	Nandu Mama	Hotstar	7 episodes

== Personal life ==
He lives in Chandigarh. Currently he is doing theatre with 'The Centre of Music Performing Arts Natya Yatris' with Neelam Mansingh Chowdhry.

== Awards and nominations ==
Year	Film	Award Ceremony	Category	Result
2018	Rupinder Gandhi 2	PTC Punjabi Film Awards	Best Comic Role	Nominated
