= Dheeraj Kumar (actor) =

Indian actor

- Born: Punjab, India
- Education: Panjab University
- Occupation: Actor
- Years active: 2015–present

Dheeraj Kumar is an Indian actor. He is best known for his role Shinda in the film Warning. He also starred in the films like Rabb Da Radio, Rocky Mental, Sajjan Singh Rangroot, Qissa Punjab, Criminal and Full Moon.

== Early life ==
Kumar was born and brought in Tambu Wala village, Muktsar, Punjab. He is graduated in MA in music from Panjab University. Later he also completed his M. A in theatre.

== Career ==
Kumar made his acting debut in 2015 with playing Harry in the film Rupinder Gandhi and in the same year, he acted in the film Qissa Punjab as Heera. In 2016, he acted in the film Asli Punjab. After this he worked in films Rabb Da Radio and Rockey Mental in 2017. In 2018, he appeared in Diljit Dosanjh starrer film Sajjan Singh Rangroot. Again he acted in the films Kaka Ji, Rabb Da Radio 2, Mitti Virasat Babbran Di, Amaanat. In 2021, he came to limelight with playing character in Warning (series). Also he acted in films like Oye Bhole Oye, Ik Sandhu Hunda Si, Kala Shehar, Criminal, Full Moon and Paune 9.

== Filmography ==
Year	Movie	Roles	Notes	Refs.
2015	Rupinder Gandhi	Harry	Debut movie	
2015	Qissa Punjab	Heera		
2016	Asli Punjab	Satti		
2017	Rabb Da Radio	Hardeep		
2017	Rocky Mental			
2018	Sajjan Singh Rangroot	Dheera Singh		
2018	Rang Panjab			
2019	Kaka Ji	Randheer		
2019	Rabb Da Radio 2	Hardeep		
2019	Mitti: Virasat Babbaran Di			
2019	Amaanat			
2020	Ik Sandhu Hunda Si	Grewal		
2021	Kala Shehar			
2021	Warning	Shinda		
2022	Takhatgarh			
2022	Criminal	Arjun		
2023	Paune 9			
2023	Rab Di Mehhar	Iqbal		
2023	Full Moon	Ehaan		
2024	Warning 2	Keepa		
2024	Oye Bhole Oye			
