= Dev Kharoud =

Indian actor (born 1989)

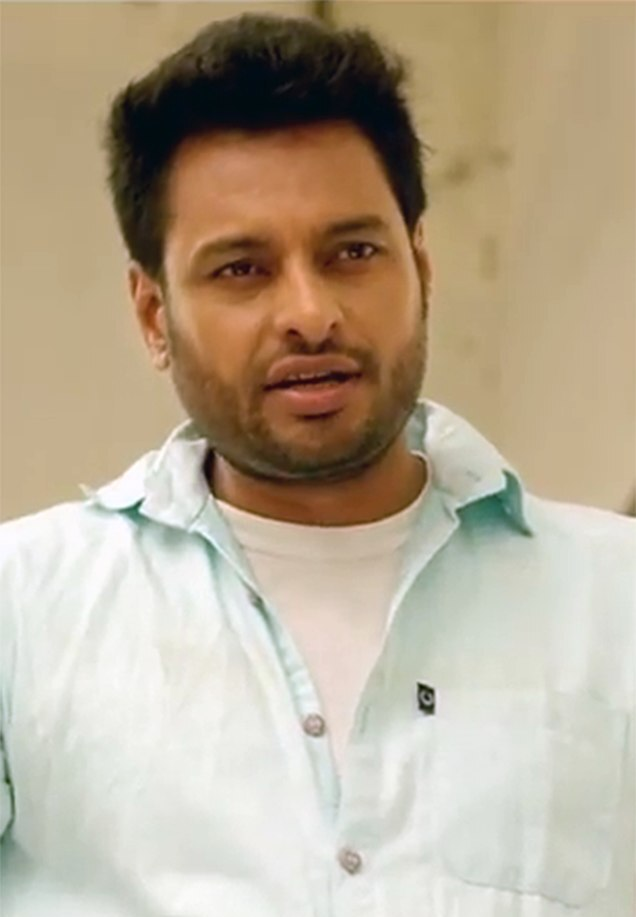
- Kharoud in 2020
- Born: Davinder Singh Kharoud; 22 April; Patiala, Punjab, India
- Education: BA
- Occupation: Actor
- Years active: 2007–present

Davinder Singh Kharoud (born 22 April) better known as Dev Kharoud, is an Indian actor who works in Punjabi cinema. He is best known for playing the role of Rupinder Gandhi in Rupinder Gandhi The Gangster. He also played the role of Mintu Gurusaria in the 2018 film Dakuan Da Munda.

== Career ==
Kharoud started his career as a theatre artist with Bhagwant Mann as a comedian and played various roles on stage. He has appeared in Punjabi teleserials as well.

In 2012, he was in the news for essaying a character inspired by Balwant Singh Rajoana in the movie Sadda Haq. Kharoud also appeared in the title role of the movie Rupinder Gandhi – The Gangster..?. He also played the character of Rupinder Gandhi in its sequel Rupinder Gandhi 2 - The Robinhood.

He played the lead role in Dakuan Da Munda, a film based on the autobiography of a gangster-turned-writer Mintu Gurusaria.

In 2019, he released three films including Kaka Ji, DSP Dev, and Blackia. Out of these three films, the most watched film is Blackia which earned 18 crores worldwide and was considered a hit.

== Filmography ==
=== Films ===
Key
| † | Denotes films that have not yet been released |

| Year | Film | Role | Notes |
|---|---|---|---|
| 2006 | Dil Apna Punjabi | Kanwal's Friend | |
| 2008 | Hashar - A Love Story | Harry NRI | |
| 2010 | Kabbadi Ik Mohhabat | Jagjit Singh | |
| 2013 | Sadda Haq | Rajwant Singh | |
| 2015 | Rupinder Gandhi – The Gangster. ? | Rupinder Gandhi | |
| 2016 | Saka - The Martyrs of Nankana Sahib | Kehar Singh | |
| 2016 | Dulla Bhatti Wala | Zorawar Singh | |
| 2017 | Rupinder Gandhi 2 - The Robinhood | Rupinder Gandhi | |
| 2017 | Bailaras | Karma | |
| 2018 | Dakuan Da Munda | Mintu Gurusaria | |
| 2018 | Jindari | Jarnail Jolly | |
| 2018 | Yaar Belly | Mahie | |
| 2019 | Kaka Ji | Kulwinder "Kaka" | |
| 2019 | Blackia | Gamma | |
| 2019 | DSP Dev | Dev Shergill | |
| 2019 | Naukar Vahuti Da | Special Appearance | |
| 2020 | Zakhmi | Gurshaan Singh | |
| 2022 | Dakuaan Da Munda 2 | Manga Singh | |
| 2022 | Shareek 2 | Gurbaaz Randhawa | |
| 2022 | Bai Ji Kuttange | Bai Ji | |
| 2023 | Yaaran Da Rutbaa | Arjun | |
| 2023 | Maurh | Kishna Maurh | |
| 2024 | Blackia 2 | Gamma, Billa | |
| 2024 | Ucha Dar Babe Nanak Da | | |
| 2024 | Gandhi 3 | Rupinder Gandhi | |
| 2025 | Majhail | Baldev Singh Batth | |
| 2025 | Dakuaan Da Munda 3 | Karma Sandhu | |
| 2026 | DSP Dev 2 | DSP Dev | |

=== As a producer ===
- Kabbadi Ik Mohhabat

=== TV serials ===
- Agg De Kalire
- Alhna
- Jugnu mast mast
- Asan Hun Tur Jana
- June 85
- Koi Pather Se Na Mare
- Roop Basant
- Khada Pita Barbaad Kita

=== Music videos ===
| Year | Title | Artist | Label | Notes |
|---|---|---|---|---|
| 2021 | Surrender | Afsana Khan | Brand B | Starring Japji Khaira |
| 2023 | Jatt Disda | Sunanda Sharma | Mad 4 Music | |

== Awards and nominations ==
| | Movie | Award | Category | Result | Ref. |
|---|---|---|---|---|---|
| 2018 | Rupiner Gandhi 2 | Filmfare Awards Punjabi | Critics Best Actor in Lead Role (Male) | Nominated | |
| 2019 | Dakuaan Da Munda | PTC Punjabi Film Awards 2019 | Best Actor | Nominated | |
| 2020 | Blackia | PTC Punjabi Film Awards 2020 | Best Actor | Nominated | |
