= List of Punjabi films of 2023 =

This is a list of Punjabi cinema films released in 2023.

== Box office collection ==
The following is the list of highest-grossing Punjabi cinema films released in 2023. The rank of the films in the following table depends on the estimate of worldwide collections as reported by organizations classified as green by Wikipedia. (Note: See WP:RSP, WP:ICTFSOURCES) There is no official tracking of domestic box office figures within India.

Highest grossing Bengali cinema films of 2024
Rank (Note: Sorted based on the lowest value when figures are presented as a range, and for the same value, the older item is given a higher order.)	Title	Production company	Worldwide gross	Ref.
1	Carry on Jatta 3	Humble Motion Pictures	₹100 crore	
2	Mastaney	Vehli Janta Films; Fateh Film Production; Omjee Star Studios	₹69 crore	
3	Kali Jotta	Neeru Bajwa Entertainment; U&I Films; VH Entertainment	₹42.53 crore	
4	Jodi	Thind Motion Films; Rhythm Boyz Entertainment	₹36.15 crore	
5	Annhi Dea Mazaak Ae	Panj Paani Films; Rhythm Boyz	₹18.44 crore	
6	Godday Godday Chaa	Zee Studios; VH Entertainment	₹25.02 crore	
7	Medal	Desi Junction	₹4.5 crore	
8	Maurh	Rhythm Boyz; Naad Sstudios	₹2.03 crore	
9	Es Jahano Door Kitte Chal Jindiye	Neeru Bajwa Entertainment; Ghaint Boyz Entertainment	₹1.29 crore	
10	Mitran Da Naa Chalda	Pankaj Batra Films; Zee Studios	₹43 lakh	

== January–June ==
Opening		Title	Director	Cast	Ref.
F E B	3	Kali Jotta	Vijay Kumar Arora	Neeru Bajwa, Satinder Sartaaj, Wamiqa Gabbi	
F E B	10	Tu Hovein Main Hovan	Vakil Singh	Jimmy Sheirgill, Kulraj Randhawa, Sajjan Adeeb, Delbar Arya	
F E B	17	Gol Gappe	Smeep Kang	Binnu Dhillon, Rajat Bedi, B. N. Sharma	
F E B	24	Ji Wife Ji	Avtar Singh	Roshan Prince, Karamjit Anmol, Anita Devgan	
M A R	8	Mitran Da Naa Chalda	Pankaj Batra	Gippy Grewal, Tania	
M A R	17	Nigah Marda Ayi Ve	Rupinder Inderjit	Sargun Mehta, Gurnam Bhullar	
M A R	24	Rang Ratta	Gurcharan Singh	Roshan Prince, Gurpreet Ghuggi, Diljott, Mahabir Bhullar	
M A R	24	Ki Mein Jhooth Boleya	Amritpreet Singh	Roshan Prince, Shehnaz Seher, Nisha Bano, Nirmal Rishi	
M A R	30	Yaaran Diyan Poun Baaran	Upasana Singh	Nanak Singh, Swati Sharma, Harnaaz Sandhu, Jaswinder Bhalla, Upasana Singh	
A P R	7	Chal Jindiye	Uday Pratap Singh	Neeru Bajwa, Gurpreet Ghuggi, Kulwinder Billa, Jass Bajwa, Aditi Sharma, Rupinder Rupi	
A P R	14	Udeekan Teriyan	Raj Sinha	Jaswinder Bhalla, Pukhraj Bhalla, Vindu Dara Singh	
A P R	14	Yaaran Da Rutba	Mandeep Benipal	Dev Kharoud, Prince Kanwaljit Singh, Rahul Dev, Yesha Sagar	
A P R	21	Annhi Dea Mazaak Ae	Rakesh Dhawan	Ammy Virk, Pari Pandher, Nasir Chinyoti	
A P R	28	Mining - Reyte te Kabzaa	Simranjit Singh Hundal	Singga, Sara Gurpal, Ranjha Vikram Singh, Pradeep Singh Rawat	
M A Y	5	Jodi	Amberdeep Singh	Diljit Dosanjh, Nimrat Khaira	
M A Y	12	Nidarr	Mandeep Chaahal	Raghav Rishi, Kulnoor Brar, Vikramjeet Virk	
M A Y	12	Painter	Taj	Mehraaj Singh, Akriti Sahota	
M A Y	18	Sidhus of Southall	Navaniat Singh	Sargun Mehta, Ajay Sarkaria, Prince Kanwaljit Singh, B. N. Sharma, Iftikhar Thakur, Amar Noorie, Jatinder Kaur	[38]
M A Y	19	Mera Baba Nanak	Amanmeet Singh	Vikramjeet Virk, Amanmeet Singh, Harashjot Kaur, Harpreet Bains, Malkeet Rauni	
M A Y	26	Godday Godday Chaa	Vijay Kumar Arora	Sonam Bajwa, Tania, Gitaz Bindrakhia, Gurjaz	
J U N E	2	Medal	Maneesh Bhatt	Jayy Randhawa, Baani Sandhu	
J U N E	2	Lehmberginni	Ishaan Chopra	Ranjit Bawa, Mahira Sharma	
J U N E	9	Maurh	Jatinder Mauhar	Dev Kharoud, Ammy Virk, Vikramjeet Virk, Kuljinder Singh Sidhu, Amiek Singh Virk	
J U N E	29	Carry on Jatta 3	Smeep Kang	Gippy Grewal, Sonam Bajwa, Gurpreet Ghuggi	

== July–December ==
Opening		Title	Director	Cast	Ref.
J U L	14	Superstar	Ksshitij Chaudhary	Gurnam Bhullar, Roopi Gill	
J U L	14	Kade Dade Diyan Kade Pote Diyan	Laada Siyan Ghuman	Harish Verma, Simi Chahal	
J U L	21	Tufang	Dheeraj Rattan	Guri, Rukshar Dhillon, Jagjeet Sandhu, Mahabir Bhullar|	
A U G	04	Balle O Chalaak Sajjna	Royal Singh	Raj Singh Jhinjar, Molina Sodhi, Vikram Chouhan, Nirmal Rishi, Raj Dhaliwal	
A U G	25	Mastaney	Sharan Art	Tarsem Jassar, Gurpreet Ghuggi, Simi Chahal	
S E P	15	Buhe Bariyan	Uday Pratap Singh	Neeru Bajwa, Nirmal Rishi, Rubina Bajwa	
S E P	28	Gaddi Jaandi Ae Chalaangaan Maardi	Smeep Kang	Ammy Virk, Binnu Dhillon, Jaswinder Bhalla	
O C T	20	Maujaan Hi Maujaan	Smeep Kang	Binnu Dhillon, Gippy Grewal, Karamjit Anmol	

== See also ==
- List of Punjabi films of 2022
- List of Punjabi films
- 2023 in film
- List of Indian films of 2023
