= List of highest-grossing Punjabi films =

The following are the highest-grossing Punjabi-language films, produced in the industries of Pollywood, India and Lollywood, Pakistan combined.

== Global gross figures ==
In this chart, films are ranked by the revenues from theatrical exhibition at their nominal value, along with the highest positions they attained. The Legend of Maula Jatt, Jatt & Juliet 3 and Carry On Jatta 3 ranked at the top positions respectively for Pakistani Punjabi and Indian Punjabi films. Films with more than ₹250 million gross are only considered.

† Background shading indicates films playing in the week commencing 9 October 2026 in theaters around the world.

Rank	Title	Worldwide Gross (INR or PKR)	Year	Reference(s)
1	The Legend of Maula Jatt	Rs. 396 crore (US$14 million)	2022	
2	Jatt & Juliet 3	₹107 crore (US$11 million)	2024	
3	Carry On Jatta 3	₹103 crore (US$11 million)	2023	
4	Mastaney	₹74 crore (US$7.7 million)	2023	
5	Sardaar Ji 3 †	₹64.60.2 million (US$7.2 million)	2025	
6	Carry On Jatta 2	₹57.67 crore (US$8.43 million)	2018	
7	Chal Mera Putt 2	₹55.4 crore (US$5.8 million)	2020	
8	Saunkan Saunkne	₹55 crore (US$5.7 million)	2022	
9	Honsla Rakh	₹54 crore (US$5.6 million)	2021	
10	Shadaa	₹52.75 crore (US$7.49 million)	2019	
11	Chaar Sahibzaade	₹45.96 crore (US$7.53 million)	2014	
12	Shinda Shinda No Papa	₹386.2 million (US$6.02 million)	2024	
13	Sardaarji	₹38.38 crore (US$5.98 million)	2015	
14	Jatt Nuu Chudail Takri	₹330 million (US$5 million)	2024	
15	Babe Bhangra Paunde Ne	₹32.11 crore (US$4.8 million)	2022	
16	Manje Bistre	₹31.74 crore (US$4.87 million)	2017	
17	Chal Mera Putt	₹30 crore (US$4.26 million)	2019	
18	Angrej	₹30.68 crore (US$4.78 million)	2015	
19	Qismat	₹28 crore (US$4.09 million)	2018	
20	Sajjan Singh Rangroot	₹26 crore (US$3.8 million)	2018	
21	Muklawa	₹25.52 crore (US$3.62 million)	2019	

== Highest-grossing films adjusted for inflation ==
Highest-grossing films as of November 2022 adjusted for inflation
Rank	Title	Worldwide gross	Year
1	The Legend of Maula Jatt	Rs. 396 crore (US$14 million)	2022
2	Chaar Sahibzaade	₹620.5 million (equivalent to ₹1.1 billion or US$11 million in 2026)	2014
3	Carry On Jatta 2	₹688.2 million (equivalent to ₹1.0 billion or US$10 million in 2026)	2018
4	Shadaa	₹615.6 million (equivalent to ₹830 million or US$8.7 million in 2026)	2019
5	Sardaar Ji	₹489.1 million (equivalent to ₹810 million or US$8.4 million in 2026)	2015
6	Saunkan Saunkne	₹576.0 million (equivalent to ₹670 million or US$6.9 million in 2026)	2022
7	Chal Mera Putt 2	₹571.5 million (equivalent to ₹730 million or US$7.6 million in 2026)	2020
8	Jatt & Juliet	₹352.7 million (equivalent to ₹730 million or US$7.5 million in 2026)	2012
9	Jatt & Juliet 2	₹389.4 million (equivalent to ₹720 million or US$7.5 million in 2026)	2013
10	Honsla Rakh	₹546.2 million (equivalent to ₹670 million or US$6.9 million in 2026)	2021
11	Angrej	₹398.4 million (equivalent to ₹660 million or US$6.8 million in 2026)	2015
12	Manje Bistre	₹407.4 million (equivalent to ₹620 million or US$6.5 million in 2026)	2017
13	Qismat	₹372.3 million (equivalent to ₹540 million or US$5.6 million in 2026)	2018
14	Chhalla Mud Ke Nahi Aaya	₹394.3 million (equivalent to ₹460 million or US$4.7 million in 2026)	2022
15	Chal Mera Putt 3	₹391.9 million (equivalent to ₹480 million or US$5.0 million in 2026)	2021
16	Ardaas Karaan	₹369.0 million (equivalent to ₹500 million or US$5.2 million in 2026)	2019
17	Chal Mera Putt	₹362.5 million (equivalent to ₹490 million or US$5.1 million in 2026)	2019
18	Love Punjab	₹306.1 million (equivalent to ₹480 million or US$5.0 million in 2026)	2016
19	Qismat 2	₹364.1 million (equivalent to ₹450 million or US$4.6 million in 2026)	2021
20	Ambarsariya	₹302.1 million (equivalent to ₹470 million or US$4.9 million in 2026)	2016
21	Bambukat	₹298.0 million (equivalent to ₹470 million or US$4.9 million in 2026)	2016
22	Sardaar Ji 2	₹293.9 million (equivalent to ₹460 million or US$4.8 million in 2026)	2016
23	Sajjan Singh Rangroot	₹300.5 million (equivalent to ₹440 million or US$4.6 million in 2026)	2018
24	Muklawa	₹295.9 million (equivalent to ₹400 million or US$4.2 million in 2026)	2019
25	Babe Bhangra Paunde Ne	₹290.0 million (equivalent to ₹340 million or US$3.5 million in 2026)	2022

== Highest-grossing films by country ==
=== India ===
Background shading indicates films playing in the week commencing 9 October 2026 in India.

Rank	Title	Gross	Year	Ref
1	Jatt & Juliet 3	₹436.5 million	2024	
2	Carry On Jatta 3	₹425.0 million	2023	
3	Carry On Jatta 2	₹400 million	2018	
4	Shadaa	₹344.4 million	2019	
5	Mastaney	₹280.0 million	2023	
6	Honsla Rakh	₹266.6 million	2021	
7	Sardaar Ji	₹254.3 million	2015	
8	Chaar Sahibzaade	₹245.6 million	2014	
9	Chal Mera Putt 2	₹198.4 million	2020	
10	Qismat	₹192.5 million	2018	

=== Canada ===
Background shading indicates films playing in the week commencing 9 October 2026 in Canada.

Rank	Title	Gross (US dollars)	Gross (Indian currency)	Year	Ref
1	Jatt & Juliet 3 †	US$2,240,000	₹187.0 million	2024	
2	Chal Mera Putt 2	US$2,130,000	₹158.3 million	2020	
3	Ardaas Karaan	US$1,454,992	₹104.6 million	2019	
4	Shadaa	US$1,450,000	₹102.1 million	2019	
5	Saunkan Saunkne	US$1,404,743	₹110.1 million	2022	
6	Angrej	US$1,403,869	₹89.4 million	2015	
7	Chal Mera Putt	US$1,301,332	₹93.3 million	2019	
8	Chaar Sahibzaade	US$1,083,552	₹66.8 million	2014	
9	Love Punjab	US$1,048,110	₹70.4 million	2016	
10	Sufna	US$1,042,090	₹77.3 million	2020	

=== United Kingdom and Ireland ===
Background shading indicates films playing in the week commencing 9 October 2026 in United Kingdom.

Rank	Title	Gross (GBP)	Gross (Indian currency)	Year	Ref
1	Chaar Sahibzaade	£767,740	₹71.6 million	2014	
2	Chal Mera Putt 2	£624,298	₹64.1 million	2020	
3	Jatt & Juliet 3 †	£619,470	₹67.0 million	2024	
4	Honsla Rakh	£458,181	₹45.8 million	2021	
5	Chal Mera Putt	£418,425	₹37.3 million	2019	
6	Chal Mera Putt 3	£377,347	₹38.9 million	2021	
7	Chaar Sahibzaade: Rise of Banda Singh Bahadur	£295,869	₹25.6 million	2016	
8	Sardaar Ji	£256,872	₹25.5 million	2015	
9	Sajjan Singh Rangroot	£251,546	₹23.4 million	2018	

== Highest-grossing films overseas ==
Background shading indicates films playing in the week commencing 9 October 2026 in theaters around the world.

Rank	Title	Gross (US dollars)	Gross (INR)	Year	Ref
1	Sardaar Ji 3 †	(US$7,230,00)	₹64.60.2 million	2025	
2	Jatt & Juliet 3 †	US$6,330,323	₹570.0 million	2024	
3	Carry On Jatta 3	US$5,900,000	₹490.0 million	2023	
4	Chal Mera Putt 2	US$4,969,654	₹373.1 million	2020	
5	Mastaney	US$4,980,000	₹410.0 million	2023	
6	Honsla Rakh	US$3,745,292	₹279.6 million	2021	
7	Chal Mera Putt	US$3,600,000	₹253.5 million	2019	
8	Chaar Sahibzaade	US$3,570,000	₹217.8 million	2014	
9	Ardaas Karaan	US$2,700,000	₹190.1 million	2019	
10	Shadaa	US$2,650,000	₹186.6 million	2019	
11	Angrej	US$2,580,000	₹164.3 million	2015	
12	Manje Bistre	US$2,490,000	₹162.1 million	2017	
13	Carry On Jatta 2	US$2,350,000	₹160.8 million	2018	
14	Love Punjab	US$2,260,000	₹151.8 million	2016	
15	Sajjan Singh Rangroot	US$2,070,000	₹141.6 million	2018	
16	Sardaar Ji	US$2,020,000	₹129.5 million	2015	

== Highest-grossing films by year ==
Background shading indicates films playing in the week commencing 9 October 2026 in theaters around the world.

Year	Title	Worldwide gross (INR)	Source
1992	Jatt Jeona Mour (film)	₹6 million	
1999	Mahaul Theek Hai Shaheed Udham Singh	₹25.0 million (Both)	
2002	Jee Aayan Nu	₹33.0 million	
2003	Hawayein	₹35.8 million	
2004	Des Hoyaa Pardes	₹66.0 million	
2005	Yaraan Naal Baharaan	₹23.0 million	
2006	Dil Apna Punjabi	₹90.0 million	
2007	Mitti Wajaan Maardi	₹57.5 million	
2008	Mera Pind	₹67.5 million	
2009	Munde U.K. De	₹57.0 million	
2010	Mel Karade Rabba	₹105.0 million	
2011	Jihne Mera Dil Luteya	₹125.0 million	
2012	Jatt & Juliet	₹230.9 million	
2013	Jatt & Juliet 2	₹279.5 million	
2014	Chaar Sahibzaade	₹463.4 million	
2015	Sardaar Ji	₹383.8 million	
2016	Love Punjab	₹251.6 million	
2017	Manje Bistre	₹325.0 million	
2018	Carry On Jatta 2	₹576.7 million	
2019	Shadaa	₹527.5 million	
2020	Sufna	₹193.5 million	
2020	Chal Mera Putt 2	₹571.5 million	
2021	Honsla Rakh	₹546.2 million	
2022	Saunkan Saunkne (India)	₹550 million	
2022	The Legend of Maula Jatt (Pakistan)	₹879.6 million (Pakistani Rs. 2389 million)	
2023	Carry On Jatta 3	₹1027.5 million	
2024	Jatt & Juliet 3†	₹1036.4 million	
2025	Sardar Ji 3†	₹640.2 million	

== Highest-grossing franchises and film series ==
† Background shading indicates that at least one film in the series is playing in the week commencing 9 October 2026 in theaters around the world.

Highest-grossing Panjabi franchises and film series^{[§]}(The films in each franchise can be viewed by selecting "show".)

Rank	Franchise / Series	Total worldwide box office (crore INR)	No. of films	Average of films (crore INR)	Highest-grossing film (crore INR)

1	Carry on Jatta	₹180	3	₹60	Carry On Jatta 3 (₹102)
1	Carry on Jatta 3 (2023)	₹102			
2	Carry On Jatta 2 (2018)	₹60			
3	Carry On Jatta (2012)	₹18			

2	Jatt & Juliet †	₹155.58	3	₹52	Jatt & Juliet 3 (₹104.54)
1	Jatt & Juliet 3 (2024) †	₹104.54			
2	Jatt & Juliet 2 (2013)	₹27.95			
3	Jatt & Juliet (2012)	₹23.09			

3	Sardaar Ji	₹126.8	3	₹42	Sardaar Ji (₹64.22)
1	Sardaar Ji (2015)	₹38.38			
2	Sardaar Ji 2 (2016)	₹24.20			
3	Sardar Ji 3 (2025)	₹64.22			

4	Chal Mera Putt	₹124.28	3	₹41	Chal Mera Putt 2 (₹57.15)
1	Chal Mera Putt 2 (2020-2021-2022)	₹57.15			
2	Chal Mera Putt 3 (2021)	₹35.84			
3	Chal Mera Putt (2019)	₹31.29			

5	Qismat	₹64.55	2	₹32	Qismat 2 (₹33.27)
1	Qismat (2018)	₹31.28			
2	Qismat 2 (2021)	₹33.27			
3	Qismat 3	₹0			

6	Chaar Sahibzaade	₹64.39	2	₹32	Chaar Saahibzaade (₹46.34)
1	Chaar Sahibzaade (2014)	₹46.34			
2	Chaar Sahibzaade: Rise of Banda Singh Bahadur (2016)	₹18.05			

7	Nikka Zaildar	₹52.15	3	₹17	Nikka Zaildar 2 (₹19.20)
1	Nikka Zaildar (2016)	₹15.00			
2	Nikka Zaildar 2 (2017)	₹19.20			
3	Nikka Zaildar 3 (2019)	₹17.95			

8	Manje Bistre	₹51.75	2	₹26	Manje Bistre (₹32.50)
1	Manje Bistre (2017)	₹32.50			
2	Manje Bistre 2 (2019)	₹19.25			
3	Manje Bistre 3	₹0			

9	Ardaas	₹48.82	2	₹24	Ardaas Karaan (film) (₹31.82)
1	Ardaas (2016)	₹17.00			
2	Ardaas Karaan (2019)	₹31.82			
3	Ardaas 3	₹0			

10	Rabb Da Radio	₹30	2	₹15	Rabb Da Radio (₹16.00)
1	Rabb Da Radio (2017)	₹16.00			
2	Rabb Da Radio 2 (2019)	₹14.00			
3	Rabb Da Radio 3 (2022)	₹0			

11	Dakuaan Da Munda	₹26.74	2	₹13	Dakuaan Da Munda (₹15.00)
1	Dakuaan Da Munda (2018)	₹15.00			
2	Dakuaan Da Munda 2 (2022)	₹11.74			

12	Laung Laachi	₹19.56	2	₹10	Laung Laachi (₹15.00)
1	Laung Laachi (2018)	₹15.00			
2	Laung Laachi 2 (2022)	₹4.56			

13	Golak Bugni Bank Te Batua	₹18.2	2	₹9	Golak Bugni Bank Te Batua (₹18.2)
1	Golak Bugni Bank Te Batua (2018)	₹18.2			
2	Golak Bugni Bank Te Batua 2(2023)	₹0.00			

14	Shareek	₹17.72	2	₹9	Shareek (₹10.50)
1	Shareek (2015)	₹10.50			
2	Shareek 2 (2022)	₹7.22			

15	Mr & Mrs 420	₹15.2	2	₹8	Mr & Mrs 420 Returns (₹9.20)
1	Mr & Mrs 420 (2014)	₹6.00			
2	Mr & Mrs 420 Returns (2018)	₹9.20			
3	Mr & Mrs 420 3 (2023)	₹0			

16	Munde U.K. De	₹13	2	₹7	Aa Gaye Munde U.K. De (₹7.30)
1	Munde U.K. De (2009)	₹5.70			
2	Aa Gaye Munde U.K. De (2014)	₹7.30			

17	Blackia	₹12	1	₹12	Blackia (₹12.00)
1	Blackia (2019)	₹12.00			
2	Blackia 2 (2023)	₹0			

18	Yaar Annmulle	₹10.71	2	₹5	Yaar Anmulle (₹6.20)
1	Yaar Annmulle (2011)	₹6.20			
2	Yaar Anmulle Returns (2021)	₹4.51			

19	Teeja Punjab	₹10.43	1	₹10	Teeja Punjab (₹10.43)
1	Teeja Punjab (2021)	₹10.43			
2	Teeja Punjab 2 (2022)	₹0			

20	Sikander	₹9.89	2	₹5	Sikander 2 (₹7.89)
1	Sikander (2013)	₹2.00			
2	Sikander 2 (2019)	₹7.89			
3	Sikander 3	₹0			

21	Warning	₹9.79	1	₹10	Warning (₹9.79)
1	Warning (2021)	₹9.79			
2	Warning 2 (2022)	₹0			

22	Rupinder Gandhi the Gangster..?	₹9	2	₹5	Rupinder Gandhi 2: The Robinhood (₹6.0)
1	Rupinder Gandhi the Gangster..? (2015)	₹3.00			
2	Rupinder Gandhi 2: The Robinhood (2017)	₹6.00			
3	Rupinder Gandhi 3	₹0			

23	Daddy Cool Munde Fool	₹8.5	2	₹4	Daddy Cool Munde Fool (₹8.50)
1	Daddy Cool Munde Fool (2013)	₹8.50			
2	Daddy Cool Munde Fool 2 (2022)	₹0			

24	Jora 10 Numbaria	₹6.13	2	₹3	Jora: The Second Chapter (₹4.73)
1	Jora 10 Numbaria (2017)	₹1.40			
2	Jora: The Second Chapter (2020)	₹4.73			
