= List of Punjabi films of 2021 =

This is a list of Punjabi films scheduled to be released in 2021.

== Box office ==
Rank	Movie	Studios	Worldwide Gross	Source
1	Honsla Rakh	Thind Motion Films, Storytime Productions	₹54.00 crore (US$7.2 million)	
2	Chal Mera Putt 3	Rhythm Boyz Entertainment	₹35.84 crore (US$4.8 million)	
3	Qismat 2	Shri Narotam Productions	₹33.27 crore (US$4.4 million)	
4	Puaada	A & A Advisors, Brat Films	₹18.05 crore (US$2.4 million)	
5	Paani Ch Madhaani	Dara Films Entertainment, Dara Motion Picture P Ltd.	₹17.61 crore (US$2.3 million)	
6	Teeja Punjab	Amberdeep Productions, Omjee Star Studios	₹10.23 crore	
7	Warning	Humble Pictures, Desi Entertainment	₹9.54 crore	
8	Yaar Anmulle Returns	Shree Filmz, Jarnail Ghumaan, White Hill Studio	₹4.51 crore	
9	Moosa Jatt	White Hill Studio	₹4.03 crore	
10	Fuffad Ji	K Kumar Studios	₹3.10 crore	

== Released ==
Opening		Title	Director	Cast	Studio (production house)	Ref.
F E B	26	Aape Pein Siyaape	Sharhaan Singh	Sharhaan Singh, Aditi Sharma and Rajesh Sharma	Sharhaan Singh Productions, Vikas Kansal Productions	
A P R	16	Kuriyan Jawan Baapu Preshaan	Avtar Singh	Karamjit Anmol, Ekta Gulati Khera, Piya Sharma, Lucky Dhaliwal	Ranjiv Singla Productions	
A U G	12	Puaada	Rupinder Chahal	Ammy Virk, Sonam Bajwa	A&A Pictures	
S E P	10	Yaar Anmulle Returns	Harry Bhatti	Harish Verma, Yuvraj Hans, Prabh Gill, Navpreet Banga	Shree Filmz, Batra Show Biz, They See Records, Jarnail Ghumaan	
S E P	23	Qismat 2	Jagdeep Sidhu	Ammy Virk and Sargun Mehta	Shri Narotam Ji Production, Zee Studios	
O C T	1	Chal Mera Putt 3	Janjot Singh	Amrinder Gill, Simi Chahal	Rhythm Boyz Entertainment	
O C T	1	Moosa Jatt	Khushpal Singh, Dilsher Singh	Sidhu Moose Wala, Sweetaj Brar	White Hill Studio	
O C T	15	Honsla Rakh	Amarjit Singh Saron	Diljit Dosanjh, Sonam Bajwa, Shehnaaz Gill, Shinda Grewal	Thind Motion Films, Storytime Productions	
O C T	22	Yes I Am Student	Tarnvir Jagpal	Sidhu Moose Wala, Mandy Takhar	Tarn Jagpal Films, Apna Heritage Films	
N O V	5	Paani Ch Madhaani	Vijay Kumar Arora	Gippy Grewal, Neeru Bajwa	Dara Films Entertainment	
N O V	17	Fuffad Ji	Pankaj Batra	Binnu Dhillon, Jassie Gill, Gurnam Bhullar	Zee Studios, K Kumar Studios	
D E C	3	Teeja Punjab	Amberdeep Singh	Amberdeep Singh Nimrat Khaira	Amberdeep Productions, Omjee Star Studios	
D E C	17	Shava Ni Girdhari Lal	Gippy Grewal	Neeru Bajwa Himanshi Khurana Parminder Gill	Humble Motion Pictures, Puja Entertainment, Omjee Star Studios	

== See also ==
- List of Punjabi films of 2020
- List of Punjabi films
- List of highest-grossing Punjabi films
