= List of Punjabi films of 2022 =

This is a list of Punjabi films that have either been released in 2022.

== Box office ==
Highest worldwide gross of 2022
Rank	Title	Production company	Distributed by	Gross
1	Saunkan Saunkne	Naad Studios; Dreamiyata; JR Production House	Zee Studios; White Hill Studios	₹57.60 crore (US$6.8 million)
2	Chhalla Mud Ke Nahi Aaya	Rhythm Boyz Entertainment Amberdeep Films	Rhythm Boyz; Omjee Star Studios	₹39.45 crore (US$4.7 million)
3	Babe Bhangra Paunde Ne	Thind Motion Films		₹32.11 crore (US$3.8 million)
4	Aaja Mexico Challiye	Thind Motion Films Ammy Virk Productions	Thind Motion Films White Hill Studios	₹23.72 crore (US$2.8 million)
5	Maa	Humble Motion Pictures	Omjee Star Studios	₹18.79 crore (US$2.2 million)
6	Yaar Mera Titliaan Warga	Humble Motion Pictures	Omjee Star Studios	₹17.03 crore (US$2.0 million)
7	Galwakdi	Vehli Janta Films	Omjee Star Studios	₹15.91 crore (US$1.9 million)
8	Dakuaan Da Munda 2	Dream Reality Movies	Omjee Group	₹11.74 crore (US$1.4 million)
9	Honeymoon	Baweja Studios; T-Series Films	T-Series Films	₹11.36 crore (US$1.3 million)
10	Lekh	White Hill Studios		₹10.17 crore (US$1.2 million)

== Released ==
Opening		Title	Director	Cast	Studio/ Production house	Ref.
F E B	4	Jhalle Pai Gaye Palle	Manjit Singh Tony, Gurmeet Saajan	Mannat Singh, Gurmeet Saajan, Gurchet Chitarkar, Dilawar Sidhu and Parminder Gill	Satnam Singh Batra, Goyal Music	
F E B	18	Mera Vyah Kara Do	Sunill Khosla	Hobby Dhaliwal, Dilpreet Dhillon, Sunny Gill, Mandy Takhar and Parminder Gill	Raju Chadha, Manish Dutta, Vibha Dutta Khosla	
F E B	25	Aaja Mexico Challiye	Rakesh Dhawan	Ammy Virk, Nasir Chinyoti and Zafri Khan	Ammy Virk Productions, Thind Motion Films	
M A R	4	Main Viyah Nahi Karona Tere Naal	Rupinder Inderjit	Sonam Bajwa, Gurnam Bhullar, Sukhwinder Raj	Diamondstar Worldwide	
A P R	1	Lekh	Manvir Brar	Gurnam Bhullar, Tania	White Hill Studios	
M A Y	6	Maa	Baljit Singh Deo	Amarjit Singh Saron, Divya Dutta, Vadda Grewal, Rana Ranbir, Gippy Grewal, Gurpreet Ghuggi	Naad SStudios, Dreamiyata Pvt. Ltd and JR Production House	
M A Y	13	Saunkan Saunkne	Amarjit Singh Saron	Ammy Virk, Sargun Mehta, Nimrat Khaira	Naad SStudios, Dreamiyata Pvt. Ltd and JR Production House	
M A Y	27	PR	Manmohan Singh	Harbhajan Mann, Delbar Arya, Kanwaljit Singh, Sardool Sikander, Karamjit Anmol	Sarang Films & HM Records	
J U N
J U N	17	Sass Meri Ne Munda Jamya	D.K. Bains	Nirmal Rishi, Hardeep Gill, Gurinder Makna, Gurpreet Bhangu and Parminder Gill	Gagandeep Bhullar, Sanjeev Mittal, Preetpal Shergil	
J U N	24	Television	Taj	Kurvinder Billa, Gurpreet Ghuggi and Mandy Thakar	Simerjit Singh Productions, Saga Studios	
J U N	24	Sher Bagga	Jagdeep Sidhu	Ammy Virk, Sonam Bajwa and Nirmal Rishi	Ammy Virk Productions	
J U L	8	Ghund Kadh Le Ni Sohreyan Da Pind Aa Gaya	Ksshitij Chaudhary	Gurnam Bhullar, Sargun Mehta	Shri Narotamji Films	
J U L	8	Shareek 2	Navaniat Singh	Jimmy Sheirgill, Dev Kharoud	Ohri Productions	
J U L	15	Baajre Da Sitta	Jass Grewal	Ammy Virk, Tania, Noor Chahal, Guggu Gill, Nirmal Rishi, Seema Kaushal and Parminder Gill	Shri Narotamji Films	
J U L	22	Padma Shri Kaur Singh	Vikram Pradhan	Karam Batth, Prabh Grewal	Karam Batth Productions	
J U L	29	Chhalla Mud Ke Nahi Aaya	Amrinder Gill	Binnu Dhillon, Amrinder Gill, Sargun Mehta, Karamjit Anmol	Rhythm Boyz Entertainment, Amberdeep Films	
A U G	5	Jind Mahi	Sameer Pannu	Sonam Bajwa, Ajay Sarkaria	White Hill Studios	
A U G	19	Laung Laachi 2	Amberdeep Singh	Neeru Bajwa, Ammy Virk	Villagers Film Studio	
S E P	16	Moh	Jagdeep Sidhu	Sargun Mehta, Gitaz Bindrakhia, Amrit Amby, Parminder Gill	Shri Narotam Ji Studios, Tips Films Ltd. & Orion Studios	
S E P	23	Chhalle Mundiyan	Sunil Puri	Ammy Virk, Mandy Takhar, Kulwinder Billa, Karamjit Anmol, Parminder Gill	Shri Narotam Ji Studios, Tips Films Ltd. & Orion Studios	
O C T	5	Babe Bhangra Paunde Ne	Amarjit Singh Saron	Diljit Dosanjh, Sargun Mehta	Thind Motion Films	
O C T	15	Vich Bolunga Tere	Gurmeet Saajan, Manjeet Singh Tony	Ravinder Grewal, Molina Sodhi, Nisha Bano, Gurmeet Saajan, Parminder Gill	Thind Motion Films	
N O V	4	Oye Makhna	Simerjit Singh	Ammy Virk, Tania , Guggu Gill, Siddhika Sharma, Parminder Gill	Ammy Virk Productions, Simerjit Productions	

== See also ==
- List of Punjabi films of 2021
- List of Punjabi films
- 2022 in film
