= List of Punjabi films of 2020 =

This is a list of Punjabi films of 2020.

== Box office ==
Rank	Movie	Studios	Worldwide Gross	Source
1	Chal Mera Putt 2	Rhythm Boyz Entertainment	₹57.15 crore	
2	Sufna	Panj Paani Films	₹19.35 crore	
3	Ik Sandhu Hunda Si	Golden Bridge Entertainment	₹10.26 Crore	
4	Jinde Meriye	Pankaj Batra Films, Omjee Star Studios	₹6.05 Crore	
5	Jora: The Second Chapter	Bathinde Wale Bai Films	₹4.73 crore	

== Released ==
Opening		Title	Director	Cast	Studio (production house)	Ref.
J A N	3	Jaan To Pyara	Harpreet Singh Matharoo	Inderjit Nikku, Rai Jujhar, Sakshi Maggo, Yuvleen Kaur and Veena Malik	Prabhjot Kamal Films, Self Love Productions	
J A N	17	Khatre Da Ghuggu	Shivtar Shiv, Aman Cheema	Jordan Sandhu, Diljott and B. N. Sharma	Ananta Films, Omjee Star Studios	
J A N	24	Jinde Meriye	Pankaj Batra	Parmish Verma and Sonam Bajwa	Pankaj Batra Films, Omjee Star Studios	
F E B	7	Zakhmi	Inderpal Singh	Dev Kharoud and Anchal Singh, Parminder Gill	Binnu Dhillon Productions, Omjee Star Studios	
F E B	14	Sufna	Jagdeep Sidhu	Ammy Virk, Tania, and Jagjeet Sandhu	Panj Paani Films	
F E B	28	Ik Sandhu Hunda Si	Rakesh Mehta	Gippy Grewal and Neha Sharma	Golden Bridge Entertainment	
M A R	6	Jora: The Second Chapter	Amardeep Singh Gill	Dharmendra, Guggu Gill, Deep Sidhu	Bathinde Wale Bai Films	
M A R	13	Chal Mera Putt 2	Janjot Singh	Amrinder Gill, Simi Chahal, Garry Sandhu, and Iftikhar Thakur	Rhythm Boyz Entertainment	
M A R	13	Ikko~Mikke	Pankaj Verma	Satinder Sartaaj and Aditi Sharma	Sartaaj Films India	
