= Alankrita Bora =

Indian actress, singer, model and dancer

- Born: Guwahati, Assam, India
- Education: Delhi Public School Society
- Occupations: Actress; Dancer; Model
- Years active: 2018–present
- Known for: Miss Northeast India, Beauty face of the year; Youngest Finalist in Miss Diva Universe 2016
- Modeling information
- Hair color: Black

Alankrita Bora is an Indian actress, model and professional dancer based in Kathak and Bharatnatyam. She made her Bollywood debut through 2018 movie Raja Abroadiya, directed by Lakhwinder Shabla. She also appeared in Nanhi Si Kali: Betiyaan.

== Career ==
Bora made her Bollywood debut in the 2018 movie Raja Abroadiya directed by Lakhwinder Shabla.

In 2022, she appeared in the movie The Divine Romance alongside Jitesh Thakur.

== Filmography ==
Year	Film	Role	Notes	Ref.
2018	Raja Abroadiya	Twinkle	Bollywood debut	
2022	The Divine Romance	Shakti		
2025	Tara & Akash: Love Beyond Realms	Tara		
