= Mukesh Gautam =

Indian film director

- Born: 22 July 1960 (age 66); Uttar Pradesh, Sahanpur
- Occupation: Film director
- Title: Chief Advisor, PTC Network
- Children: Yami; Surilie

Mukesh Gautam is an Indian film director and works predominantly in Punjabi-language films. He is known for his films Akhiyaan Udeekdian (2009), Ek Noor (2011), Kuknoos (2016) and Baghi Di Dhee (2022). He is also the father of Bollywood actress Yami Gautam and Surilie Gautam.

== Life ==
He is Himachali, have roots from Bilaspur, Himachal. He is the father of Yami Gautam and Surilie Gautam.

He has created docudramas on the life and contributions of Baba Sheikh Farid, Baba Bulleh Shah, Waris Shah, noted Punjabi singers Bibi Surinder Kaur, Kuldeep Manak, Ustad Puran Shahkoti, humourist K Deep, singer Gurmeet Bawa, Surjit Bindrakhia, Sarabjit Kokewali, Sartaj etc. He received a national award from the radio and television fraternity for an outstanding film about Sayyed Waris Shah. Apart from that, he has created around 50 short features on art, culture, history, traditions, rituals and personalities of Punjab Named as Virsa. Noteworthy among those are "Origin of Chandigarh", "Gurudwara", "Tradition of Langar", "Punj Kakaar", "Ma Boli", "Chhaju Da Chaubara", "Dhabas on GT Road", "Making of Gur", and noted writer Amrita Pritam. Recently, He received a National Film award for his film Baghi Di Dhee as the best Punjabi Film of the year 2024

Currently, he is working on three feature films titled 'Shubh Karman' 'Amazing Rano' and 'MOHNA' which are based on social life & values and sports respectively.

== Filmography ==
- Akhiyaan Udeekdian (2009)
- Ek Noor (2011)
- Kuknoos (2016)
- Azaab (2018)
- Baghi Di Dhee (2022)
