= Vaapsi =

- Directed by: Rakesh Mehta
- Screenplay by: Rakesh Mehta
- Story by: Rakesh Mehta
- Produced by: Lakhwinder Shabla; Shailey Arya; Jagmohan Arora
- Starring: Harish Verma; Sameksha; Gulshan Grover; Ashish Duggal; Dhrriti Saharan; Lakhwinder Shabla; Mandeep Kaur
- Cinematography: Dhirender Shukla
- Edited by: Rakesh Mehta; Alok Pandey
- Music by: Gurmit Singh
- Production companies: Miraj Ventures; Speed Records
- Release date: 3 June 2016
- Country: India
- Language: Punjabi

Vaapsi (Return) is an Indian Punjabi language drama film directed by Rakesh Mehta and starring Harish Verma, Sameksha, Dhrriti Saharan and Gulshan Grover. This film is about a young probable hockey player, Ajit Singh, who gets trapped in a tragic situation during the dark days of Punjab.

== Plot ==
Vaapsi film is the story of those youngsters, who left their country after 1984 massacre to survive and settle in other countries. Now all of them just want to come back to their native homes. They are eagerly waiting for the moment when they will come back to their country.

The main protagonist of the story, Ajit Singh (Harish Verma), resides with his parents and sister

== Music ==
No.	Title	Lyrics	Music	Singer(s)	Length
1.	"Saari Saari Raat"	Manish Verma	Gurmeet Singh	Akhil	03:52
2.	"Vaapsi (Title Song)"	Amardeep Gill	Gurmeet Singh	Kamal Khan	02:05
3.	"Rooh"	Vijay Dhammi	Gurmeet Singh	Nooran Sisters	02:19
4.	"Pagg di Pooni"	Amrit Maan	Gurmeet Singh	Amrit Maan	02:11

== Cast ==
- Harish Verma as Ajit Singh
- Dhrriti Saharan as Rajjo
- Sameksha as Jeetan
- Gulshan Grover as Ajit Singh
- Ashish Duggal as G.S Bawa
- Lakhwinder Shabla
- Mandeep Kaur
