= Baghi Di Dhee =

2022 Indian drama film by Mukesh Gautam

- Theatrical release poster
- Directed by: Mukesh Gautam
- Written by: Giani Gurmukh Singh Musafir; Pali Bhupinder Singh
- Produced by: Rabindra Narayan
- Starring: Kuljinder Singh Sidhu; Dilnoor Kaur; Vaquar Shaikh; Gurpreet Bhangu
- Music by: Tejwant Kittu
- Production company: PTC Motion Pictures
- Release date: 25 November 2022
- Country: India
- Language: Punjabi

Baghi Di Dhee (transl. Rebel's Daughter) is a 2022 Indian Punjabi-language drama film directed by Mukesh Gautam. The film stars Kuljinder Singh Sidhu, Dilnoor Kaur, Vaquar Shaikh, and Gurpreet Bhangu.

== Plot ==
Baghi Di Dhee follows the story of Deep, a young girl from Punjab whose father is a Ghadar revolutionary fighting for India's independence against the British. Deep inherits her father's rebellious spirit and courage and participates in the Ghadar movement with him. When British officers come to arrest her father, Deep attacks and kills a British officer with her pen. Her father is jailed and Deep is taken by a relative working for the British and thrown into a canal, where she drowns. Years later, her father seeks revenge for her death.

== Cast ==
- Kuljinder Singh Sidhu as Deep's father
- Dilnoor Kaur as Deep
- Vaquar Shaikh
- Gurpreet Bhangu

== Production ==
The trailer of Baghi Di Dhee was released on 18 November 2022, and the film premiered in theaters on 25 November 2022. It was produced under the banner of PTC Motion Pictures. Mukesh Gautam directed the film and it was produced by Rabindra Narayan, MD and President of PTC Network. The movie was filmed in and around Chandigarh including areas in Ropar and Balachaur of Punjab. A bungalow near Chandigarh dating back to 1914 was used as a filming location. The film is based on an original work written by Giani Gurmukh Singh Musafir, a freedom fighter and the fifth Chief Minister of Punjab.

The film's music was composed by Tejwant Kittu and songs were written and performed by the singer-lyricist Bir Singh.

== Awards ==
In August 2024, Baghi Di Dhee won the Best Punjabi Film category at the 70th National Film Awards.
