= The Journey of Punjab 2016 =

- Directed by: Inderjit Moga, Balraj Sagar
- Written by: Deep Jagdeep
- Starring: Rana Ranbir, Rahul Jugral, Surjit Singh Sidhu, Anita Meet, Gurchet Chitarkar, Gurpreet Bhangu, Mintu Kapa
- Release date: 2016
- Country: India
- Language: Punjabi

The Journey of Punjab 2016 is a 2016 Punjabi film directed by Inderjit Moga and Balraj Sagar. It is written by Deep Jagdeep. The film is about the menace of drugs in the Indian state of Punjab.

== Plot ==
The film revolves around four Punjabi youngsters.

== Cast ==
- Rana Ranbir as Raj Rai, minister
- Rahul Jugral as Chandigarhiya
- Surjit Singh Sidhu as Bai Ji
- Anita Meet
- Gurchet Chitarkar
- Gurpreet Bhangu
- Mintu kapa

== Pre-Production and Production ==
Red Arts Punjab started its journey by doing a series of performances of the play Aakhir Kadon Tak at various places in Punjab and its neighboring states.

The idea of making a film materialized after Surjeet Singh Sidhu, a college principal, agreed to produce it. The story of the play Aakhir Kadon Tak was then transformed into the screenplay by Inderjit Moga.
