= Kudi Haryane Val Di =

2024 Indian Punjabi-language romantic comedy film

- Theatrical release poster
- Directed by: Rakesh Dhawan
- Screenplay by: Rakesh Dhawan
- Produced by: Pawan Gill; Aman Gill; Sunny Gill
- Starring: Ammy Virk; Sonam Bajwa; Ajay Hooda; Yograj Singh; Yashpal Sharma; Hardip Gill
- Cinematography: Anshul Chobey
- Edited by: Gaurav Rai
- Music by: V Rakx, Happy Raikoti, Avvy Sra, Ajay Hooda, Gulshan Sharma, Sandeep Saxena
- Production company: Ramara Films
- Distributed by: White Hill Studios
- Release date: 14 June 2024
- Running time: 160 minutes
- Country: India
- Language: Punjabi

Kudi Haryane Val Di (transl. Girl From Haryana) is a 2024 Indian Punjabi-language romantic comedy that released on 14 June 2024.

The film was announced in September 2023. The music rights of the film are with Zee Music Company. Soundtrack of the film was composed by Happy Raikoti, V Rakx, Avvy Sra, Ajay Hooda, Gulshan Sharma, which features vocals from Ammy Virk, Raj Mawar, Mannat Noor and Komal Choudhary.

The film was theatrical released worldwide on 14 June 2024. The film was opened to positive response by critics with Times of India giving it 4 stars and calling it a Superhit cross cultural of Punjab and haryanvi on screen, and the Indian Express giving it 4 stars as well and calling it A Delightful Romantic Comedy

== Plot ==
Kudi Haryane Val Di is backdropped on Punjab and Haryana's oldest sporting love, that of wrestling. Shivjot hails from a wrestling family in Punjab, while Neelam is born in a noted wrestling family of Haryana. Shivjot's father and grandfather carry a family legacy of wrestling, however, Shivjot has no interest in pursuing wrestling and contrarily, Neelam is as passionate about the sport as much as her father, Mann Singh Dahiya and her late brother, Vinod. When a dreamy Shivjot sets his eyes on Neelam in a chance encounter, he is smitten and follows her to her village under the guise of a wrestling coach. The two fall in love and other than the cultural conflicts and lies in their relationship the film centres around the conflict with the villains, Neelam's fiancé, a strong wrestler Mahavir, and her father's archrival, Sheeshpal. How Shivjot and Neelam overcome this against all odds is the crux of the story. Another story that joins this main arch is that of Jung Singh who is searching for his missing daughter Lalli, who is Neelam's friend and seeks shelter at her house in Haryana, her father makes life difficult for Shivjot and his friends in his quest to end in a comedy of errors climax that unites all the characters of Punjab and Haryana.

== Cast ==
- Ammy Virk as Shivjot
- Sonam Bajwa as Neelam Dahiya
- Ajay Hooda as Mahavir
- Yograj Singh as Jung Singh
- Yashpal Sharma as Mann Singh Dahiya
- Hardip Gill as Shivjot's Father
- Mahavir Bhullar as Shivjot's Grandfather
- Honey Mattu as Shivjot's Masseuse
- Seema Kaushal as Shivjot's Mother
- Deedar Gill as Shivjot's Friend
- Mintu Kapa as Shivjot's Friend
- Navdeep Bajwa as Shivjot's Friend
- Manpreet Dolly as Lalli

== Release ==
Kudi Haryane Val Di was theatrically released on 14 June 2024. The film is available on Chaupal OTT for streaming.

== Soundtrack ==
Kudi Haryane Val Di

Soundtrack album by Happy Raikoti, VRakx, Avvy Sra, Ajay Hooda, Gulshan Sharma
- Recorded: 2019
- Genre: Feature film soundtrack
- Length: 15:30
- Label: Zee Music Company

The soundtrack of Kudi Haryane Val Di is composed by Happy Raikoti, VRakx Music, Avvy Sra, Ajay Hooda, Gulshan Sharma, lyrics by Happy Raikoti and Ajay Hooda.

Track listing
No.	Title	Lyrics	Music	Singer(s)	Length
1.	"Kudi Haryane Val Di (Title Song)"	Happy Raikoti	VRakx Music	Ammy Virk & Komal Choudhary	3:27
2.	"DIL CHANDRA"	Happy Raikoti	VRakx Music	Ammy Virk & Mannat Noor	3:55
3.	"Chann Russeya"	Happy Raikoti	VRakx music	Ammy Virk & Komal Choudhary	3:00
4.	"Ikk Hai Ikk Hai"	Happy Raikoti	Avvy Sra	Ammy Virk	2:30
5.	"Jaatni"	Ajay Hooda	Gulshan Sharma	Raj Mawar	2:32
Total length:					15:30
