= Himanshi Khurana =

Indian model, actress, and singer (born 1991)

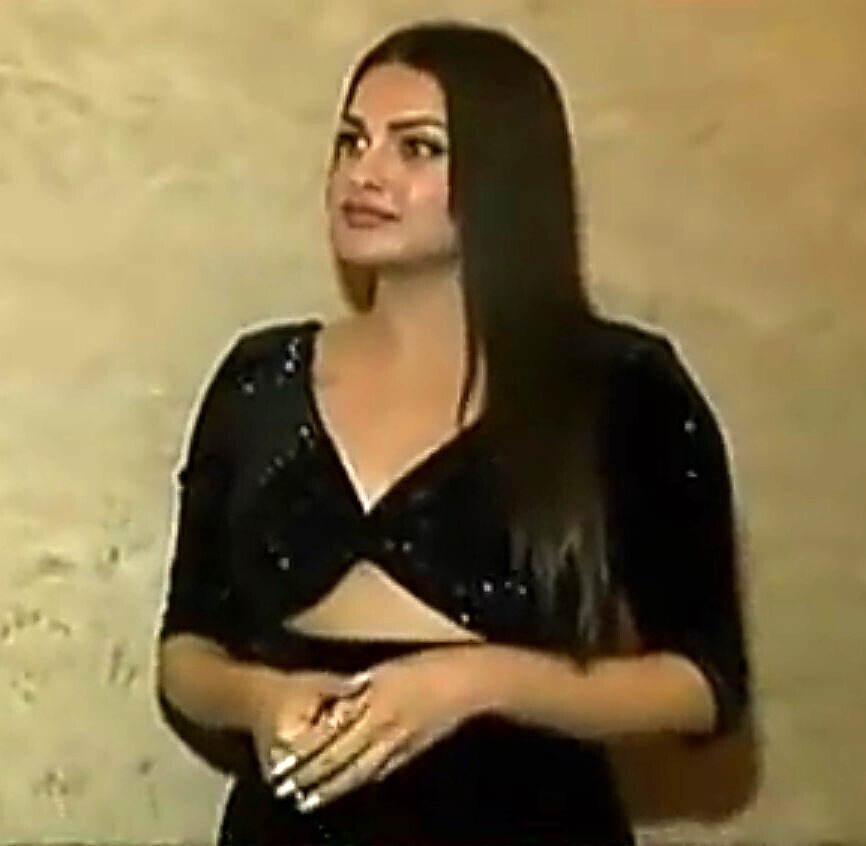
- Born: 27 November 1991 (age 34); Kiratpur Sahib, Punjab, India
- Occupations: Actress; model
- Years active: 2010–present
- Known for: Bigg Boss 13
- Notable work: Sadda Haq

Himanshi Khurana (born 27 November 1991) is an Indian model, actress and singer who works in Punjabi films. She appeared in the Punjabi movie Sadda Haq. In 2019, she participated in the reality show Bigg Boss 13 as a contestant.

== Early life ==
Khurana was born on 27 November 1991 and hails from Kiratpur Sahib, Punjab.

== Career ==
Khurana started her modelling career at the age of 16 when she became Miss Ludhiana. She was one of the finalists in Miss PTC Punjabi 2010. In the same year she won Miss North Zone contest organised in Chandigarh.

She made her debut in the Punjabi Music industry with the song "Jodi - Big Day Party" (Panjabi MC & Kuldeep Manak) in 2010. Later, in 2012, she starred in the music videos for (Fasli Bateray) by (Feroz Khan) and Izhaar (Harjot). In 2013, Khurana was seen in Soch (Hardy Sandhu) and the hit movie Sadda Haq. The year 2015 proved to be a very successful year for Khurana as she worked with many singers, including Jassi Gill, Badshah, J Star, Ninja, Mankirt Aulakh and others. In March 2016 she starred alongside Sukh-E (Muzical Doctorz) in Sad Song. In 2018, Khurana made her debut as a singer with the song High Standard.

Khurana made her debut in Punjabi cinema as an actor with the Punjabi movie Sadda Haq which helped her to gain fame. Although her first Bollywood film was Jeet Lengey Jahaan (2012). She then appeared as a lead role in Punjabi movie Leather Life (featuring Aman Dhaliwal as male lead).2015 Punjabi language film 2 Bol also features Khurana as a lead actress. She also acted in six south Indian Movies - 2 Kannada, 2 Tamil, 1 Telugu, 1 Malayalam.

In November 2019, Khurana participated as a celebrity contestant in the thirteenth season of the Indian version of the reality TV show Big Brother, Bigg Boss.

== Personal life ==
In November 2019, Khurana confirmed on Bigg Boss 13 that she is in a committed relationship with her boyfriend of nine years named Chow. In January 2020, she confirmed on Twitter that her relationship had ended with her fiancé. She was in a relationship with her Bigg Boss co-contestant Asim Riaz from January 2020 to December 2023.

== Media ==
Himanshi Khurana was ranked in the Chandigarh Times Most Desirable Woman at No. 2 in 2016 as well as 2017, at No. 14 in 2018, at No. 9 in 2019 as well as 2020.

Khurana was ranked in the Times Most Desirable Women on TV at No. 11 in 2019, at No. 17 in 2020.

In 2021, Himanshi became the first female Punjabi actor to feature at the New York's Times Square.

== Filmography ==
=== Films ===
Year	Title	Role	Notes	Ref.
2012	Jeet Jangey Jahaan	Unknown		
2013	Sadda Haq	Sukhpreet		
2015	Leather Life	Siffat		
2015	2 Bol	Unknown		
2018	Afsar	Unnamed	Song: "Udhar Chalda"	
2021	Shava Ni Girdhari Lal	Surjeet Kaur		

=== Television ===
Year	Title	Role	Notes	Ref.
2019	Bigg Boss 13	Contestant	14th place	

=== Music videos ===
Year	Title	Singer(s)	Ref.
2010	Jodi - Big Day Party	Kuldeep Manak, Panjabi MC	
2012	Supna	Manna Dhillon	
2012	Fasli Batteray	Feroz Khan	
2012	Izhaar	Harjot	
2012	Naina De Buhe	Lakhwinder Wadali	
2013	Soch	Hardy Sandhu	
2014	Back to Bhangra	Roshan Prince, Sachin Ahuja	
2014	Insomnia	Sippy Gill	
2015	Laden	Jassi Gill	
2015	Na Na Na Na	J-Star	
2015	Thokda Reha	Ninja	
2015	Bingo Mad Angles Song	Badshah, A-Kay, Maninder Buttar	
2015	Go Baby Go	Ronnie	
2015	Gal Jattan Wali	Ninja	
2015	Gabru 2	J-Star	
2015	Charda Siyaal	Mankirt Aulakh	
2015	Soorma	Harjot	
2016	Gallan Mithiyan	Mankirt Aulakh	
2016	Sad Song	Sukhe	
2016	Be Mine	Amar Sajaalpuriya	
2016	Jetha Putt	Goldy Desi Crew	
2016	Teri Call	Harsimran	
2016	Brakefail	Harnav Brar Feat Sukhe	
2016	Bhabhi	Major	
2017	Athra Subha	Ninja	
2017	Mann Bharrya	B Praak	
2017	Saade Munde Da Viah	Dilpreet Dhillon and Goldy	
2017	Palazzo	Kulwinder Billa and Shivjot	
2017	Door	Kanwar Chahal	
2017	Black n White	Gurnazar	
2017	Peg Di Waashna	Amrit Maan	
2018	Ajj Vi Chaunni Aah	Ninja	
2018	Handsome Jatta	Jordan Sandhu	
2018	Digde Athru	Jaskaran Riar	
2018	Collar Bone	Amrit Maan	
2018	Udhaar Chalda	Gurnam Bhullar and Nimrat Khaira	
2019	Gabru Nu Tarsengi	Jordan Sandhu	
2019	Bloodline	Sippy Gill	
2020	Kalla Sohna Nai	Neha Kakkar	
2020	O Jaanwaale	Akhil Sachdeva	
2020	Tamasha	Marshall Sehgal	
2020	Khyaal Rakhya Kar	Preetinder	
2020	Bazaar	Afsana Khan	
2020	Dil Ko Maine Di Kasam	Arijit Singh	
2020	Afsos Karoge	Stebin Ben	
2020	Allah Khair Kare	Saajz	
2020	Keh Len De	Kaka	
2021	Palazzo 2	Kulwinder Billa and Shivjot	
2021	Zyada Vadia	Nishawn Bhullar	
2021	Sky High	Asim Riaz	
2021	Farq Nahi Padta	Stebin Ben	
2022	Propose	Ajam Khan	
2022	Aakad	Simar Sethi	
2022	Challa	Dilraj Grewal	
2022	Gawara Nahi	Ankit Tiwari	
2023	Eid	Garry Sandhu ft. Asim Riaz	

== Discography ==
Year	Title	Music	Lyrics	Co-artist(s)	Ref.
2018	High Standard	Snappy	Rav Hanjra		
2019	Agg	Gur Sidhu	Garry		
2019	I Like It	Bunty Bains	Garry		
2020	Ohdi Shreaam	Jassi X	Bunty Bains, Singga		
2020	Suit Dwaade	Snappy	Bunty Bains		
2020	Distance	Desi Crew	Bunty Bains		
2021	Surma Bole	Bunty Bains			
2021	Gallan Bholiyan	MixSingh	Kavvy Riyaaz		
2022	Pinjra	Charan	Charan, Asim Riaz	Asim Riaz	
