= Carry on Jatta 2 =

2018 Indian film by Smeep Kang

Carry On Jatta 2
- Theatrical release poster
- Directed by: Smeep Kang
- Screenplay by: Vaibhav Suman; Shreya Srivastava
- Produced by: Gunbir Singh Sidhu; Manmord Sidhu; Atul Bhalla; Amit Bhalla
- Starring: Gippy Grewal; Sonam Bajwa; Gurpreet Ghuggi; Binnu Dhillon; Jaswinder Bhalla; B.N. Sharma; Karamjit Anmol; Upasana Singh; Jyotii Sethi
- Cinematography: Maneesh Chandra Bhatt
- Edited by: Rohit Dhiman
- Music by: Jay K (Jassi Katyal); Gurmeet Singh; Sukhe Musical Doctorz
- Production companies: White Hill Studios; A&A Advisors
- Distributed by: White Hill Studios
- Release date: 1 June 2018
- Running time: 150 minutes
- Country: India
- Language: Punjabi
- Budget: ₹8-12 Crore
- Box office: ₹57.67 Crore

Carry On Jatta 2 is a 2018 Indian Punjabi comedy film directed by Smeep Kang. The film is a sequel to the Carry On Jatta (2012). The film stars Gippy Grewal and Sonam Bajwa in lead roles with Gurpreet Ghuggi, Binnu Dhillon, Jaswinder Bhalla, B.N. Sharma, Karamjit Anmol and Upasana Singh and Jyotii Sethi in supporting roles.

The film was theatrically released on 1 June 2018 and turned out to be a commercial success accompanied by critical acclaim. It broke several records at the box office including the worldwide opening weekend record (earning ₹20.71 million), opening day and opening weekend records in various countries except the overseas record of all time collection of Chaar Sahibzaade. Collecting ₹562.7 million (US$6.0 million) worldwide in its theatrical run makes it second highest grossing Punjabi films of all time.

== Plot ==
Jass is an orphan guy living on rent in the house of Advocate Dhillon and his son Goldie Dhillon. The only dream of Jass is to go to Canada but he doesn't meet the eligibility as he failed in education. So, the only way to go to Canada is to marry any NRI girl in Canada. Coincidentally, his friend Honey works as a mediator in a marriage agency. Jass asks him to find any NRI girl for him. Jass and Honey go to an NRI marriage, where the people are NRIs. In the marriage, Jass meets Meet, an NRI girl, and he falls in love with her. He stalks Meet, learns that Meet is also an orphan and she had spent her whole life alone so she wants to marry a boy who has a large family. So, Jass makes a plan with Honey to trick Meet believing that Jass has a large family and he loves her a lot. Soon, Meet requests Jass to take her to meet his family with her uncle. But Jass refuses since he does not have any family. On the other hand, Meet's uncle starts searching for grooms for Meet. Her uncle and Honey had met before so they asked him to find any groom for her and Honey asks Meet to marry Jass. Jass hatches a new plan of showing that Advocate Dhillon is his father and showing Dhillon that Meet is Goldie's wife but this creates a lot of confusion and problems. After marrying Meet, Jass started asking her to go to Canada but she refuses as she thinks that it is cruel to abandon Jass's family. So, Jass makes another plan so that Meet could hate his family and should take him to Canada. It required much time but this plan works and Jass ran away with Meet but Goldie's uncle Tony saw them and informs Advocate Dhillon who thought Jass is running with his daughter-in-law (Goldie's wife) so he starts following them with his house servant who meets them on the way. Then Tony sees them running and he thinks Advocate loves her and running away. Finally, the confusion is cleared in the drama played by Honey.

== Cast ==
- Gippy Grewal as Jass
- Sonam Bajwa as Meet
- Gurpreet Ghuggi as Honey
- Binnu Dhillon as Goldy Dhillon
- Jaswinder Bhalla as Advocate Dhillon
- Jyotii Sethi as Daljeet Bansal
- B.N. Sharma as Billu Bansal
- Karamjit Anmol as Tony
- Upasana Singh as Channo

== Reception ==
=== Box office ===
==== India ====
On its first day Carry On Jatta 2 grossed ₹3.61 crores in India making a record for best opening of Punjabi film in India(₹3.05 crores from Punjab & ₹56 lakh from other states). On second day film grossed ₹4.26 crores from India making the domestic total of ₹7.87 crores. On the opening weekend, the film grossed ₹13.15 Crores from domestic box office.

Box Office Records set by Carry On Jatta – 2 upon its release (Note: All records are for Punjabi films.)
Record item	Record detail
Highest grossing Punjabi film	₹56.27 crore
Highest grossing Punjabi film in India	₹41 crore
Opening weekend for Punjabi film worldwide	₹20.71 crore
Opening weekend for Punjabi film in India	₹13.15 crore
Opening day India	₹3.61 crore
Opening day East Punjab	₹3.05 crore

Territories	Gross revenue	Opening Weekend
India	₹40 crore(US$4 million)	₹13.15 crore (US$1 million)
Overseas	₹16.9 crore(US$2 million)	₹7.5 crore (US$1 million)
United States	US$603,930(₹4.16 crore)	US$176,179 (₹1.19 crore)
Canada	US$916,529(₹6.3 crore)	US$237,280 (₹1.6 crore)
United Kingdom	£220,775(₹2.02 crore)	£97,159 (₹87 lacs)
Australia	US$476,000(₹3.24 crore)	$A 327,736 (₹1.68 crore)
New Zealand	₹86.24 lakh (US$92,000)	$NZ 94,502 (₹44.34 lacs)
Germany	₹21 lakh (US$22,000)	€7,504 (₹5.88 lacs)

=== Critical reception ===
The Times of India - rated the movie as 4 out of 5 stars summarizing "Overall, the film is a complete family package, with humour engaging audiences all through its two and half hours." Jyoti Sharma Bawa from the Hindustan Times gave the film 3 out of 5 stars saying "The jokes never stop, even when their dalliance with logic reaches a breaking point. And when you are not laughing at a joke, you are watching a song with camera focusing on Sonam Bajwa’s luminous charms Jasmine Singh of The Tribune lauded the creativity of the movie, giving it 4 out of 5 stars and termed it as a movie that stood on its own.

== Soundtrack ==
Carry On Jatta 2

Soundtrack album by Jay K (Jassi Katyal) Gurmeet Singh Sukhe Musical Doctorz
- Released: 18 April 2018
- Recorded: 2017–18
- Studio: White Hill Studios
- Genre: Feature film soundtrack
- Length: 19:26
- Language: Punjabi
- Label: White Hill Music

=== Track listing ===
Track	Song	Artist(s)	Lyrics	Music
01	Carry On Jatta 2	Gippy Grewal	Happy Raikoti	Jay K (Jassi Katyal)
02	"Gabru"	Gippy Grewal, Shipra Goyal	Happy Raikoti	Jay K (Jassi Katyal)
03	"Kikli"	Gippy Grewal, Sudesh Kumari	Happy Raikoti	Jay K (Jassi Katyal)
04	"Kurta Chadra"	Gippy Grewal, Mannat Noor	Happy Raikoti	Gurmeet Singh
05	"Bhangra Pa Laiye"	Gippy Grewal, Mannat Noor	Happy Raikoti	Gurmeet Singh
06	"DJ Wala"	Gippy Grewal	Jaani	Sukhe Musical Doctorz

== Awards and nominations ==
Award	Date of ceremony (Note: Date is linked to the article about the awards held that year, wherever possible.)	Category	Recipient	Result
PTC Punjabi Film Awards	16 March 2019	Best Film	Carry On Jatta 2	Won
PTC Punjabi Film Awards	16 March 2019	Best Actor	Gippy Grewal	Won
PTC Punjabi Film Awards	16 March 2019	Best Director	Smeep Kang	Won
PTC Punjabi Film Awards	16 March 2019	Best Dialogues	Naresh Kathooria	Won

== Sequel ==
Carry on Jatta 3 a sequel with Gippy Grewal and Sonam Bajwa in lead roles and Gurpreet Ghuggi, Binnu Dhillon, Jaswinder Bhalla, B.N. Sharma, Karamjit Anmol in supporting roles will be releasing on 29 June 2023.
