= Sadda Haq (film) =

- Directed by: Mandeep Benipal
- Written by: Kuljinder Singh Sidhu
- Produced by: Kuljinder Singh Sidhu; Dinesh Sood; Nidhi Sidhu
- Starring: Kuljinder Singh Sidhu; Himanshi Khurana; Dhriti Saharan; Gaurav Kakkar; Parmod Moutho etc.
- Cinematography: Rishi Singh
- Music by: Jatinder Shah
- Production company: OXL Films Mumbai
- Distributed by: White Hill Studios
- Release date: 10 May 2013
- Country: India
- Language: Punjabi

Sadda Haq (English translation: Our Right) is a 2013 Indian Punjabi-language film directed by Mandeep Benipal set in the late 1980s and early 1990s during the Punjab insurgency. It portrays filmmakers' perception of what prompted young men in the state to rise and fight against what was a corrupt police and government system. The film evoked polarising reactions even before it was released, with sections of the Sikh community saying that it depicted the real face of police atrocities. Critics on the other hand felt that the film was a mere "glorification" of terrorists.

== Plot ==
The movie tells the story of Sharon Gill, a modern-day Canadian Sikh graduate student who travels to India as part of her thesis on minorities at war. Revelations about the past soon leave the student curious for more information, and Gill's awareness changes after manoeuvring into prison to interview Kartaar Singh. Singh is a hockey player whose life experiences lead him to fight against injustice, corruption and equal rights in the police and government systems. The film's central story is based around Kartaar Singh's journey as a Sikh fighter which is filled with courage, perseverance, and faith.

== Cast ==
- Kuljinder Singh Sidhu as Kartar Singh Baaz (based on Jagtar Singh Hawara
- Dhriti Saharan as Sharan Gill
- Gaurav Kakkar as Karan Randhawa
- Pramod Moutho as JPS Randhawa (based on KPS Gill
- Yadd Grewal as Hansu Kadayanawala
- Dev Kharoud as Rajwant Singh Raja (based on Balwant Singh Rajoana
- Dinesh Sood as Joravar Singh (based on Dilawar Singh Babbar
- Amritpal Singh Billa as Baba Tarsem Singh
- Sudanshu Ghor as Prathamjit Singh
- Talwinder Singh Bhullar as Dr Lakhbir Singh Sabhi
- Neeraj Kaushik as Jailer
- Sandeep Kapoor CBI Officer Chetri
- Nidhi Sidhu
- Sunny Gill as Home Minister Baldev Singh
- Praveen Kumar as Santokha Kala
- Prince Kj Singh as Gopi
- Himanshi Khurana as Sukhpreet
- Parichay Sharma

== Release and reception ==
The movie was released in Australia, United Kingdom, America and Canada but the release was postponed in India.

Originally, the film was to be released in December 2009 but was delayed due to the Central Board of Film Certification's disapproval and was finally slated for worldwide release on 5 April 2013. The film was cleared by the Film Certification Appellate Tribunal (FCAT), but on 5 April, the movie was banned in Punjab, Chandigarh, Haryana, Delhi and J&K. The ban was lifted 10 May 2013.

- The producer and lead actor Kuljinder Sidhu, termed the ban "shameful" and a "black spot on democracy". Kuljinder Sidhu has decided to move court to get the ban revoked. Sidhu said the ban was arbitrary because the censor board had cleared the film with a U/A certificate.
- Punjabi actor Gippy Grewal came forward to ask for the ban to be removed.
- All India Sikh Students Federation president Karnail Singh Peermohammad condemned Shiromani Gurdwara Parbandhak Committee (SGPC) for its u-turn on the issue. He said the SGPC has been misleading people as seen in the latest statement of committee president Avtar Singh Makkar which said it was wrong to support the film despite initially supporting it.
- Shiv Sena demanded ban on the movie, as according to them it may impacts Hindu Sikh relations in Punjab and threatened to go on strike.
- A delegation of Punjab Mahila Congress (PMC) and Hindu organisations, led by the state vice-president of PMC, Nimisha Mehta, demanded a permanent ban on the Punjabi film Sadda Haq its trailers, songs, promos and promotional activities, which they alleged glorified the Khalistan movement. The film is being heavily promoted by Khalistani militant organisations in Canada
- The Canadian Sikh Coalition is batting for the film not only on its official website but also on its Facebook page where it projects itself as a "political organisation". The organisation promoted and distributed the movie in Canada.
- Chief Minister of Punjab, Parkash Singh Badal told reporters that "It is our priority to maintain peace and communal harmony in the state and we don't want that the movie should vitiate the communal atmosphere of the state".
- In Delhi, Lieutenant Governor Tejinder Khanna issued a ban order under Section 13 of the Cinematograph Act to maintain communal harmony.
- Senior Punjab BJP leader Manoranjan Kalia on Sunday lauded the Badal government for its timely action to ban the film in the interest of hard-earned peace in the state. Kalia said it was quite strange that the Central Board of Film Certification had failed to do its job (of banning the movie) despite the fact that the union ministry of information and broadcasting is headed by Manish Tewari, "who himself belongs to a martyr's family as his father Prof V. N. Tiwari was among those whose sacrifices helped in bringing peace to Punjab".
- On 11 April 2013, the Supreme Court refused to lift the ban on the film in Punjab, Haryana, Uttar Pradesh and in many other places. It lifted the ban after proper screening of the film in court no. 15 on 26 April 2013. The movie will be released with an 'A' certification on 10 May.
- Om Puri said the ban should be lifted if the movie is about the true facts.
- Former censor board chief said I&B ministry headed by Manish Tewari wanted to ban this movie.
- The Canadian Sikh Coalition (CSC) is the official distributor and representative of the Sadda Haq team across Canada.

=== Awards ===
It received the PTC Award for Best Actor and Actress.

== Multilingual dubbing ==
The producers are in the process of dubbing the film in Hindi and English, in order to make it accessible to a wider audience. "We got a lot of demand from overseas as well as different parts of India to dub the movie. The dubbing has already started and the DVD rights and satellite rights for the film will be given in both these languages. The translated version may also be screened in a few cinema halls," Kuljinder Singh Sidhu the producer of the film declared during a press conference.
