= Dhriti Saharan =

Indian actress

- Occupation: Actress
- Years active: Since 2012

Dhriti Saharan is an Indian actress who works in Punjabi cinema.

== Career ==
Saharan debuted in the Punjabi movie Pure Punjabi in 2012. Sadda Haq was her second film, for which she won Critics Choice Award for Best Actress at the 2014 PTC Punjabi Film Awards. Saharan was the lead actress in the 2016 release, Vaapsi.

== Filmography ==
Year	Film	Notes
2012	Pure Punjabi	
2013	Sadda Haq	Winner – Best Actress Critics at PTC Punjabi Film Awards 2014
2016	Vaapsi	Opposite Harish Verma
