= Gurpreet Bhangu =

Indian actress

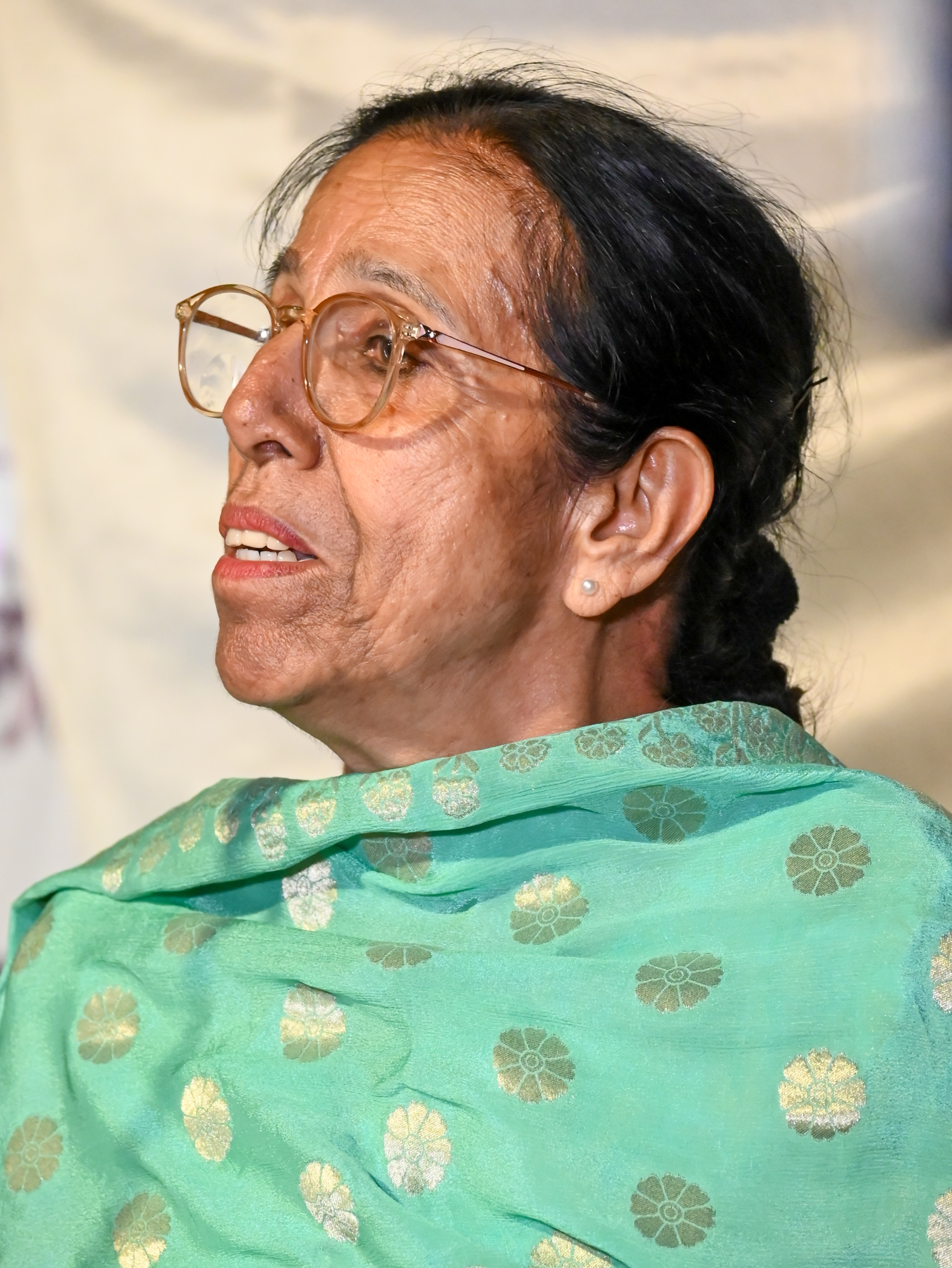
- Bhangu in 2024
- Occupation: Actress

Gurpreet Kaur Bhangu is an Indian film and television actress who is active in Indian Punjabi and Hindi cinema. She is known for her performances in Singh vs. Kaur (2013), A Tale of Punjab (2015), Ardaas (2016), and 25 Kille (2016), Babe Bhangra Paunde Ne (2022) and she also appeared in the Bollywood film Mausam.

== Filmography ==
=== Films ===
Year	Film	Role	Notes
2013	Singh vs. Kaur	Nihal's Taayi	
2016	Yaar Annmulle 2		
2016	Vaisakhi List		
2016	Ambarsariya		
2017	Sat Shri Akaal England		
2017	Nikka Zaildar 2	Roop's grandmother	
2018	Banjara - The Truck Driver		
2018	Aate Di Chidi		
2018	Son Of Manjeet Singh	Mrs. Uppal- Bagga's Debtor	
2018	Afsar	Kashmiro Taayi	
2018	Parahuna	Dhann Kaur	
2018	Laung Laachi	Bebe Tej Kaur	
2019	Tu Mera Ki Lagda		
2019	Nikka Zaildar 3	Nikka's Bhua	
2019	Jaddi Sardar	Seeto	
2019	Ardaas Karaan	Sehaj's mother	
2019	Shadaa	Chadta's Taayi	
2019	Muklawa	Kartaaro- Shinda's mother	
2019	Rabb Da Radio 2	Maam	
2019	Guddiyan Patole	Golo- Naani's sister	
2020	Teri Meri Gal Ban Gayi		
2020	Sufna		
2021	Puaada	Speaker Chachi	
2022	Bhangra Paunde Ne		
2022	Baghi Di Dhee		
2022	Kokka		
2022	Padma Shari Kaur Singh		
2023	Kali Jotta	Teacher	
2025	Pind Peya Saara Jombieland Baneya		

=== TV series ===
Year	Series	Role	Notes
2017	The Journey of Punjab 2016		
2019	Mitti: Virasat Babbaran Di	Angrej Kaur	
