= Lakhwinder Shabla =

German-Indian filmmaker and entrepreneur

- Born: 24 February 1971 (age 55); Punjab, India
- Occupations: Filmmaker and entrepreneur
- Years active: 2009–present
- Website: www.shablafilms.com

Lakhwinder Shabla (born 24 February 1971) is a German actor, theatre artist, film producer, writer, director and entrepreneur of Indian descent based in Munich, Germany. He is primarily known for his work in international cinema.

Lakhwinder co-produced films such as Vaapsi (2016), Delhi to Lahore (2014), a German language film titled Kopfwäsche (English translation: Brainwash), and a Bollywood film titled Raja Abroadiya.

The Punjabi movie Vaapsi was extensively shot in Punjab, India, and Germany and was released on 3 June 2016 in India, the US, and Canada. Raja Abroadiya was released worldwide on 16 March 2018.

25 Years later, a German film, is currently in post-production, with an expected worldwide release after the coronavirus pandemic.

== Filmography ==
Year	Film	Language	Notes
2016	Kopfwäsche (English: Brainwash)	German short film	Director, producer, writer, actor
2016	Vaapsi	Punjabi feature film	Co-producer, actor
2018	Raja Abroadiya	Hindi feature film	Director, producer, writer, actor
2019	25 Years Later	German feature film / post-production	Director, producer, writer, actor
