= Jodi – Big Day Party =

Single by Panjabi MC featuring Kuldeep Manak

from the album The Raj
- Released: 1 November 2010
- Recorded: 2010
- Genre: Bhangra
- Length: 3:59 (single version)
- Label: PMC Records
- Producer(s): Panjabi MC

Panjabi MC singles chronology
"Panjaban" (2009)	"Jodi – Big Day Party" (2010)	"Moorni" (2010)

"Jodi – Big Day Party" is a single by UK bhangra artist Panjabi MC and the first to be taken from his album The Raj. It was released in the UK and worldwide on 1 November 2010.

Both the single artwork and the track listing on the album it's lifted from omit the word 'jodi' from the title although the single appears with the full title on both Panjabi MC's official website and on all major UK online digital retailers.

== Music video ==
The video of the song was uploaded onto PMC Records's official YouTube channel on 31 October 2010. Teasers of the video had been promoted to specialist bhangra and Asian websites earlier in the month.

== Chart performance ==
In the UK, the single reached number 13 on the official Asian Download Chart on 27 November 2010. The track spent a total of 5 weeks on the chart.

== Release history ==
Region	Date	Format
Worldwide	1 November 2010	Digital download
