= Ikko Mikke =

Indian Punjabi-language romantic drama film

- Theatrical release poster
- Directed by: Pankaj Verma
- Written by: Pankaj Verma
- Produced by: Sartaaj Film; Firdaus Production
- Starring: Satinder Sartaaj; Aditi Sharma
- Cinematography: Ravi Kumar Sana
- Edited by: Sandeep Francis
- Music by: Gurcharan Singh
- Production companies: Firdaus Production; Seven Colors Motion Pictures; Saga Music
- Distributed by: Seven Colors
- Release date: 13 March 2020
- Running time: 133 minutes
- Country: India
- Language: Punjabi

Ikko Mikke (The Soulmates) is a 2020 Indian Punjabi-language, romantic drama film directed by Pankaj Verma and produced by Sartaaj Film and Firdaus Production, under the banner of Firdaus Production, Seven Colors Motion Pictures and Saga Music. The film stars Satinder Sartaaj and Aditi Sharma. The story of the film follows Nihaal (played by Satinder Sartaj), a sculptor and Dimple (played by Aditi Sharma), a theatre artiste. The two in love, elope. After marriage due to differences, they decide to separate but then their souls get swapped.

The film was released on 13 March 2020.

== Cast ==
- Satinder Sartaaj as Nihaal (sculptor)
- Aditi Sharma as Dimple (theatre artiste)
- Sardar Sohi
- Shiwani Saini as Neeru
- Mahabir Bhullar
- Vandana Sharma
- Bego Balwinder
- Vijay Kumar
- Navdeep Kaler
- Maninder Valley
- Raj Dhaliwal
- Noor Chahal
- Umang Sharma

== Release ==
The film was released on 13 March 2020.

== Soundtrack ==
Ikko Mikke

Soundtrack album by Beat Minister
- Released: 11 March 2020
- Recorded: 2020
- Genre: Feature film soundtrack
- Language: Punjabi
- Label: Saga Music

Soundtrack of the film was composed by Beat Minister and sung and written by Satinder Sartaaj.

Track listing
No.	Title	Length
1.	"Ikko Mikke Title Track"	4:21
2.	"Ishqia Pareshanian"	4:59
3.	"Sharminda"	6:15
4.	"Chronicle Of Chandigarh (PG)"	6:22
5.	"Suttey Rehan De Panchi"	4:08
6.	"Muqammal"	4:59
7.	"Eney Ku Pal"	4:45
Total length:		35:49

== Reception ==
Gurnaaz Kaur of The Tribune gave two and half stars out of five and noted thy the chemistry between Sartaaj and Aditi was fresh and heart touching. She found the soul swapping between the couple as baffling. Praising the music and cinematography she termed the film as soul-stirring.
