= Carry on Jatta 3 =

2023 Indian film by Smeep Kang

Carry On Jatta 3
- Theatrical release poster
- Directed by: Smeep Kang
- Written by: Dialogues: Naresh Kathooria
- Screenplay by: Vaibhav Suman; Shreya Srivastava
- Story by: Vaibhav Suman; Shreya Srivastava
- Produced by: Gippy Grewal; Ravneet Kaur Grewal
- Starring: Gippy Grewal; Binnu Dhillon; Sonam Bajwa; Gurpreet Ghuggi; Kavita Kaushik; Jaswinder Bhalla; Karamjit Anmol; Nasir Chinyoti
- Cinematography: Maneesh Bhatt
- Edited by: Ravi Dehru; Rohit Dhiman
- Music by: Jaani
- Production company: Humble Motion Pictures
- Distributed by: Omjee Star Studios
- Release date: 29 June 2023
- Running time: 140 minutes
- Country: India
- Language: Punjabi
- Budget: ₹15 Crore
- Box office: ₹101.90 Crore

Carry On Jatta 3, also known by the initialism COJ3, is a 2023 Indian Punjabi-language comedy film directed by Smeep Kang and produced by Humble Motion Pictures. A sequel to both Carry on Jatta (2012) and Carry On Jatta 2 (2018), it stars Gippy Grewal, Binnu Dhillon and Sonam Bajwa in the lead roles with Gurpreet Ghuggi, Kavita Kaushik, Nasir Chinyoti, Jaswinder Bhalla, B.N. Sharma and Karamjit Anmol in supporting roles.

Carry on Jatta 3 was released on 29 June 2023.

== Cast ==
- Gippy Grewal as Jass
- Binnu Dhillon as Goldy
- Sonam Bajwa as Meet
- Kavita Kaushik as Daljeet
- Jaswinder Bhalla as Advocate Dhillon
- Gurpreet Ghuggi as Honey
- Karamjit Anmol
- Nasir Chinyoti
- B.N. Sharma
- Naresh Kathooria
- Rupinder Rupi
- Ammy Virk Special Appearance

== Production ==
The film is Gippy Grewal's home production. The principal photography was begun in London. The shoot wrapped up in January 2023.

== Release ==
=== Theatrical ===
Carry on Jatta 3 was theatrically released on 29 June 2023. It was the largest release for Punjabi film release with over 560 screens in India and 500 locations in 30 countries.

=== Home media ===
The film was digitally released on Chaupal on 7 September 2023. A Hindi dubbed version was released on Disney+ Hotstar on 15 March 2024.

== Reception ==
=== Critical reception ===
Jaspreet Nijher of The Times of India gave 3.5 stars out of 5 and wrote, "A wildly comic film, it makes those over two hours in cinemas worth your penny." Sukhpreet Kahlon of The Indian Express also gave same rating and wrote, "Carry On Jatta 3 is sure to repeat the success of its earlier films. Despite its flaws, audiences will be flocking to the cinema halls to make the most of the early release on the Eid weekend."

=== Box office ===
The film collected ₹32.80 crore in first week. In second week it collected over ₹45 crore in India. The film is grossed over ₹100 crore worldwide becoming second highest grossing Punjabi film worldwide.

== Soundtrack ==
Track listing
| No. | Title | Lyrics | Music | Singer(s) | Length |
|---|---|---|---|---|---|
| 1. | "Carry On Jatta Title Track" | Romaana | Jaani | Gippy Grewal, Simar Kaur | 2:13 |
| 2. | "Farishtey" | Jaani | Jaani | B Praak | 3:13 |
| 3. | "Jatti" | Jaani | Jaani | Ammy Virk, Gippy Grewal | 2:32 |
| 4. | "Lehanga" | Jaani | Jaani | Gippy Grewal | 2:12 |
| 5. | "Bura Haal" | Sagar | Jaani | Atif Aslam | 4:00 |
