= Kali Jotta =

2023 Indian film by Vijay Kumar Arora

- Theatrical release poster
- Directed by: Vijay Kumar Arora
- Written by: Harinder Kour
- Produced by: Sunny Raj; Varun Arora; Sarla Rani; Santosh Subhash Thite; Neeru Bajwa
- Starring: Satinder Sartaaj; Neeru Bajwa; Wamiqa Gabbi
- Cinematography: Lalit Sahoo; P.P.C. Chakravarty
- Edited by: Bharat S. Rawat
- Music by: Beat Minister
- Production companies: Neeru Bajwa Entertainment; U&I Films; VH Entertainment
- Distributed by: Omjee Star Studios
- Release date: 3 February 2023
- Running time: 130 minutes
- Country: India
- Language: Punjabi
- Box office: ₹42.53 crore

Kali Jotta is a 2023 Indian Punjabi-language crime drama film directed by Vijay Kumar Arora, written by Harinder Kour and starring Satinder Sartaaj, Neeru Bajwa and Wamiqa Gabbi.

== Cast ==
- Satinder Sartaaj as Deedar
- Neeru Bajwa as Rabia
- Wamiqa Gabbi as Anant
- Prince Kanwaljit Singh as Boota
- Nikita Grover as Goldy
- Roopi Rupinder as Gurinder
- Gurpreet Bhangu as Teacher
- Harpreet Kaler as Jass
- Anita Devgan as Mental Person

== Soundtrack ==
Beat Minister has composed the music and Raju Singh has given the background score of the film while the film's lead Sartaaj has penned the lyrics.

Songs	Composer	Music	Lyrics	Singer
Nihar Len De	Satinder Sartaaj	Beat Minister	Satinder Sartaaj	Satinder Sartaaj
Rutba	Satinder Sartaaj	Beat Minister	Satinder Sartaaj	Satinder Sartaaj
Naach	Satinder Sartaaj	Beat Minister	Satinder Sartaaj	Satinder Sartaaj, Sunidhi Chauhan
Koyelan Kookdiyan	Gurcharan Singh		Harinder Kour, Amber	Rza Heer
Koshish Ta'n Kariye	Satinder Sartaaj	Beat Minister	Satinder Sartaaj	
Ohde Baad	Satinder Sartaaj	Beat Minister	Satinder Sartaaj	
Dila'n Di Gall	Satinder Sartaaj	Beat Minister	Satinder Sartaaj	

== Release ==
=== Theatrical ===
The film was released on 3 February 2023.

=== Home media ===
On 13 April 2023, the film became available for digital streaming on Chaupal, two months after its theatrical release.

== Reception ==
=== Critical response ===
The Times of India gave 4 stars out 5 and said, “Neeru Bajwa’s acting prowess and Vijay Kumar Arora’s directorial expertise combined to make a heart-wrenching cinematic piece.”

The Indian Express rated the film 4 out of 5 stars and said, “The commendable performances in the film bring the story alive with every actor playing their part with precision. Neeru Bajwa displays an impressive emotional depth and maturity.”
