= Kuljinder Singh Sidhu =

Indian film actor, writer, screenwriter, producer

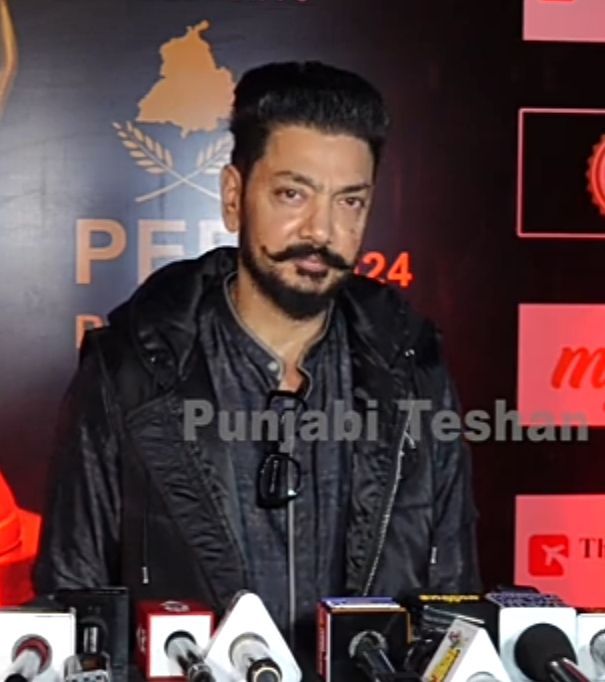
- Born: Jalandhar, India
- Occupations: Actor; writer; producer; screenplay writer
- Years active: 2009–present

Kuljinder Singh Sidhu is an Indian actor, writer and film producer, who has appeared in Punjabi films. Kuljinder made his debut as an actor and writer with the movie Sadda Haq, which he also produced. Apart from this, he has produced and written the story and screenplay of the 2014 Punjabi film Yoddha: The Warrior, in which he played lead role antagonist Rahul Dev. He has received Ptc Best Actor Award by Critics and Ptc Best Screenplay Writer Award by Critics, for the film Sadda Haq.

== Filmography ==
=== As an actor ===
- Sadda Haq (2013)
- Yoddha (2014 film)|Yoddha: The Warrior (2014)
- Shareek (2015)
- Jung e Azadi
- Punjab Singh (2018)
- Asees (2018)
- Dakuaan Da Munda (2018)
- Ardaas Karaan (2019)
- Mitti: Virasat Babbaran Di (2019)
- Baghi Di Dhee (2022)
- Maurh (2023)

=== As a writer and producer ===
- Mini Punjab (2009)
- Sadda Haq (2013)
- Yoddha: The Warrior(2014)
