= Honsla Rakh =

2021 Indian film by Amarjit Singh Saron

- Theatrical release poster
- Directed by: Amarjit Singh Saron
- Written by: Rakesh Dhawan
- Produced by: Daljit Thind; Diljit Dosanjh
- Starring: Diljit Dosanjh; Sonam Bajwa; Shehnaaz Gill; Shinda Grewal; Anayah Miglani (baby honsla)
- Cinematography: Baljit Singh Deo
- Edited by: Manish More
- Music by: Sandeep Saxena
- Production companies: Thind Motion Films; Storytime Productions
- Distributed by: White Hill Productions Ltd (overseas)
- Release date: 15 October 2021
- Running time: 145 minutes
- Country: India
- Language: Punjabi
- Box office: est. ₹54 crore

Honsla Rakh (transl. Be Patient) is a 2021 Indian Punjabi-language romantic comedy film directed by Amarjit Singh Saron starring Diljit Dosanjh, Sonam Bajwa, Shehnaaz Gill, it marks the debut of Diljit Dosanjh as producer. It was released worldwide theatrically on 15 October 2021.

The film is set in Vancouver, British Columbia, Canada, and depicts the story of a divorced father who is raising his son on his own. When he starts dating, romance and comedy ensue.

The film received positive reviews and is currently among the highest-grossing Punjabi films with a worldwide gross of ₹54 crore (US$5.6 million).

== Plot ==
Yenkey Singh is a divorced single parent, who lives with his son, Honsla Singh. He runs a successful Indian restaurant in Canada. He is desperate to find a woman for marriage, and always introduces his son as his younger brother whenever he meets a pretty girl. One day, while waiting at the airport for a delayed flight, he runs into his ex-wife, Sweety.

In a flashback, a young Yenkey and Sweety are on a date where Sweety places a condition that after marriage, they won't have any kids and would focus on their careers. But, after a few months of their marriage, Sweety gets pregnant and experiences mood swings. She demands a divorce and wants Yenkey to get child custody. After the child is born, Sweety leaves Yenkey and her newborn child with him, whom he names Honsla. Then, the film depicts the struggle Yenkey faced as a single parent, and how he couldn't marry a single girl as he is always rejected for having a child.

After the flashback, Sweety is revealed to be a successful fashion designer, who then finally meets her son, Honsla. Just as she meets Honsla, her new husband calls her, thus disappointing Yenkey. As the delayed flight is cancelled, Yenkey meets Jasmine, and falls in love with her instantly. They become friends and start dating. Yenkey proposes to Jasmine, but she rejects him as soon as she finds out he has a son. But Honsla lies, stating that his father's first wife is dead, leading to Jasmine to marry Yenkey.

Initially, both of them introduce Honsla as Yenkey's younger brother to their family, and Jasmine's parents agree to their marriage. The situation deteriorates when Sweety and her husband appear at his wedding. Yenkey and Honsla both decide to tell everyone the truth, as he doesn't want to hurt Jasmine and her parents anymore.

During their engagement, Yenkey tells everyone the truth. He confesses that Sweety was his first wife and Honsla is his and Sweety's son. Seeing his father sad, Honsla decides to stay with Sweety for his father's sake, but Yenkey, who loves Honsla, leaves the engagement on the spot. Then, it is revealed that both were doing a small drama to convince Jasmine and her family members. All of them finally forgive Yenkey and accept Honsla. Just as Sweety and her husband leave, Honsla calls Sweety "Mummy", thus enlightening her. Yenkey says that Sweety can meet Honsla whenever she wants and the film ends on a happy note with a group photo.

== Cast ==
- Diljit Dosanjh as Yenkey Singh, Restaurant owner, Jasmine's husband, Sweety's ex-husband, Honsla's father
- Sonam Bajwa as Jasmine, yoga teacher, Yenkey's wife, Honsla's stepmother
- Shehnaaz Gill as Sweety, a fashion designer, Yenkey's ex-wife, Honsla's mother
- Shinda Grewal as Honsla Singh, Yenkey and Sweety's son, Jasmine's stepson
- Anayah Miglani
- Balinder Johal as Jasmine’s grandmother
- Kamaljit Neeru as Jasmine’s mother

== Production ==
The film was announced by Diljit Dosanjh on 18 February 2021 with the lead cast Diljit Dosanjh, Sonam Bajwa, Shehnaaz Gill and Shinda Grewal, the son of actor Gippy Grewal. The film marks Dosanjh's debut as a film producer.

Filming began in March 2021 in Vancouver, Canada and principal photography was wrapped on 1 April 2021 in Canada. A promotional song of the film which was scheduled to be shot on 15 September in London was postponed, as Shehnaaz Gill was mourning the death of her friend, actor Sidharth Shukla. It was reported that Shehnaaz Gill will shoot the promotional song on 7 October.

== Release ==
=== Theatrical ===
Honsla Rakh certified with running time of 145 minutes, was released worldwide on 15 October 2021 coinciding with Dussehra holidays in India.

=== Home media ===
Honsla Rakh was released for digital streaming on 24 November 2021 on Amazon Prime Video.

== Soundtrack ==
Honsla Rakh

Soundtrack album by Avvy Sra, Mix Singh, JSL, Intense, Yeah Proof
- Released: 2021
- Genre: Feature film soundtrack
- Length: 16:27
- Language: Punjabi
- Label: Tips Punjabi

The soundtrack of the film is composed by Intense and lyrics written by Raj Ranjodh. The first track "Chanel No 5" is released on Tips Punjabi on 30 September. Second track "Guitar" composed by JSL and sung by Raj Ranjodh is released on 4 October. 3rd track "Sher" composed by Yeah Proof is released on 8 October. Four days later, 4th track "Lalkaara" composed by Avvy Sra was released on 12 October. On 14 October 5th track "Saroor" composed by Avvy Sra was released. Title track was released on 20 October.

=== Track list ===
| No. | Title | Lyrics | Music | Artist(s) | Length |
|---|---|---|---|---|---|
| 1. | "Chanel No 5" | Raj Ranjodh | Intense | Diljit Dosanjh | 3:05 |
| 2. | "Guitar" | Raj Ranjodh | JSL | Raj Ranjodh | 3:18 |
| 3. | "Sher" | Laddi Chahal | Yeah Proof | Diljit Dosanjh | 2:38 |
| 4. | "Lalkaara" | Happy Raikoti | Avvy Sra | Diljit Dosanjh | 2:24 |
| 5. | "Saroor" | Happy Raikoti | Avvy Sra | Diljit Dosanjh | 3:10 |
| 6. | "Honsla Rakh (Title Track)" | Happy Raikoti | MixSingh | Diljit Dosanjh | 1:52 |
| 7. | "Come ON Bruh" | JSL | JSL | Diljit Dosanjh | 1:45 |
| Total length: | | | | | 17:47 |

== Reception ==
Jaspreet Nijher reviewing for The Times of India rated the film with 4 stars out of 5, praised storyline writing, "[... the film] is a sublime exhibit of emotions through various equations, that of a father and his son, between a man and a woman and eventually between a woman and her son." Nijher praised the performances of Diljit Dosanjh and Shinda Grewal. Nijher wrote, "Shinda is winning hearts with his effortless acting, without losing the innocence of a child of seven." Nijher said while concluding the review: "The comedy is just enough to keep the focus on romance and the emotions, and entertaining with its straightforward references." Kritika Vaid of India.com rated the film with 3 stars out of 5 and wrote, "Honsla Rakh gives you two hours and 25 minutes of laughter. An easy-breezy family entertainer with nothing much to write about!" Kiddaan.com gave the film 4 stars out of 5 and praised the performance of Diljit Dosanjh, Sonam Bajwa, Shehnaaz Gill and Shinda Grewal, stating that "they all have done commendable jobs". Criticising the music, they wrote, "we also believe that if its music was a little better, it could have uplifted the overall feel of the movie." Kiddaan stated that "Honsla Rakh is the kind of entertainer we all needed for a long time, hence without any second thoughts, it is a must-watch."

=== Box office ===
Honsla Rakh opened with net collection of ₹55 million (US$570,000) on first day of release worldwide, which is the highest ever for a Punjabi film. The film had worldwide gross collection of ₹175 million (US$1.8 million) in opening weekend, and ₹282.5 million (US$2.9 million) in opening week.

The film as of 3 December 2021, has grossed ₹540 million (US$5.6 million) worldwide.

== PTC Punjabi Film Awards 2022 ==
Honsla Rakh received five awards at the PTC Punjabi Film Awards 2022:

- Best Film
- Best Director - Amarjit Singh Saron
- Best Actor - Diljit Dosanjh
- Most Popular Song of The Year - Guitar by Raj Ranjodh
- Best Cinematography - Baljit Singh Deo
