= Balle O Chalaak Sajjna =

Balle O Chalaak Sajjna is a 2023 Indian Punjabi-language family drama film directed by Royal Singh, produced by Sukhi Dillon, Guri Pandher, Param Sidhu and Co-produced by Mainsite Pictures, Dave Sidhu & Naval Preet Rangi. The film stars Raj Singh Jhinjhar, Molina Sodhi, Harashjot Kaur, Vikram Chouhan and Nirmal Rishi in lead roles. The film was scheduled for release theatrically on 4 August 2023.

== Cast ==
- Raj Singh Jhijhar
- Molina Sodhi
- Harasjot Kaur
- Vikram Chouhan
- Nirmal Rishi
- Mahabir Bhullar
- Raj Dhaliwal
- Prakash Gaadhu
- Gurpreet Toti

== Soundtrack ==
No.	Title	Lyrics	Singer	Length
1.	"Jhandi"	Kulbir Kotbhai	Nachattar Gill	2:42

== Release ==
The movie was released on 4 August 2023, while the first song of Balle O Challak Sajjna was released on 18 July 2023.

=== Home Media Release ===
The movie was released on the Chaupal OTT platform
