= Jinde Meriye =

Punjabi film directed by Pankaj Batra

- Theatrical Release poster
- Directed by: Pankaj Batra
- Written by: Pankaj Batra
- Produced by: Pankaj Batra; Ashu Munish Sahni; Aniket Kawade; Preeta Batra; Amandeep Singh
- Starring: Parmish Verma Sonam Bajwa Yuvraj Hans
- Cinematography: Vineet Malhotra
- Edited by: Manish More
- Music by: Hitesh Modak
- Production companies: Pankaj Batra Films; Omjee Star Studios; Nuclear Productions
- Release date: 24 January 2020
- Running time: 141 minutes
- Country: India
- Language: Punjabi
- Budget: ₹6.00 Crore
- Box office: ₹46.80 Crore

Jinde Meriye is a 2020 Indian Punjabi romance film directed by Pankaj Batra. The film stars Parmish Verma, Sonam Bajwa, Yuvraj Hans and Navneet Kaur Dhillon in the lead roles Pankaj Batra produced the film, alongside Ashu Munish Sahni, Aniket Kawade, Preeta Batra and Amandeep Singh and co-produced by Mandip Dhami. It was released in cinemas on 24 January 2020. This film was scheduled to World Television Premiere on 3 July 2021 on Pitaara TV.

== Plot ==
Yaadi, a happy-go-lucky person, and Rehmat are childhood friends who turned love birds and are planned to get married. Rehmat's dad comes to realise that Yaadi is careless about his future, and soon is against the marriage. To get Rehmat, Yaadi must stand on his own and have a prosperous career. However, Yaadi chooses an illegal way to be successful, which infuriates Rehmat, making her leave Yaadi forever.

Yaadi follows Rehmat to Scotland, becoming a drug dealer infuriating her and seeing Yaadi's change. Rehmat finds a new boyfriend which angers Yaadi, making him an alcoholic and go into depression.

Yaadi meets a woman at a bar, whom he likes. Yaadi is seen drinking around her and being more careless.

One night, Yaadi sees Rehmat enjoying with his new boyfriend (through their house window), causing him to start a scene. He even burns his (drug) money in front of them, upsetting Rehmat and making her leave him (again).

Yaadi goes back to the woman he met at the bar, who then takes him to the hospital showing him the consequences of his actions. He then realises she is a female police officer.

Soon, Yaadi becomes the most wanted man in Scotland. He is seen on the news, which surprises Rehmat, causing them to meet. They try to run away (along with Rehmat's current boyfriend), but is eventually caught. Yaadi fires a gun so the police don't come near him, then tries to run on a boat but is shot by the same woman police officer whom he spent time with. He is pronounced dead, causing Rehmat to cry at his death.

Ending the movie, we see Yaadi inside the emergency van, opening his eyes out of breath.

== Cast ==
- Parmish Verma as Yaadi/Champion
- Sonam Bajwa as Rehmat
- Yuvraj Hans as Yuvi
- Navneet Kaur Dhillon
- Malkeet Rauni
- Lakhwir Grewal as Sandhu
- Hobby Dhaliwal as Bhai
- Anita Devgan as Yaadi's Mother
- Hardeep Gill as Rehmat's Father
- Honey Mattoo

== Soundtrack ==
Jinde Meriye

Soundtrack album by Desi Crew, Troy Arif, DJ Strings
- Released: 23 January 2020
- Recorded: 2019
- Genre: Feature film soundtrack
- Length: 16:30
- Language: Punjabi
- Label: Times Music
External audio
- Audio Jukebox on YouTube

Soundtrack of the film was composed by Desi Crew, Troy Arif and DJ Strings whereas lyrics were penned by Mandeep Mavi, Laddi Chahal, Sukh Sohal and Kahlon.

Track listing
No.	Title	Lyrics	Music	Singer(s)	Length
1.	"Klolan"	Kahlon	Desi Crew	Parmish Verma	3:01
2.	"Glock"	Laddi Chahal	Desi Crew	Dilpreet Dhillon	3:47
3.	"Jinde Meriye"	Sukh Sohal	DJ Strings	Prabh Gill	3:43
4.	"Tere Bin"	Mandeep Mavi	Troy - Arif	Abhijeet Srivastava	3:28
5.	"Ni Jinde"	Laddi Chahal	Desi Crew	Laddi Chahal	2:31
Total length:					16:30

== Release ==
It was released in cinemas on 24 January 2020. The worldwide television premiere was released on 3 July 2021 Pitaara TV. the movie is also available on the Ott platform Chaupal for streaming.
