= Mastaney =

2023 Indian Punjabi-language film

- Theatrical release poster
- Directed by: Sharan Art
- Produced by: Manpreet Johal
- Starring: Tarsem Jassar; Simi Chahal; Gurpreet Ghuggi; Karamjit Anmol; Avtar Gill; Rahul Dev
- Cinematography: Jaype Singh
- Production company: Vehli Janta Films
- Distributed by: Omjee Cine World
- Release date: 25 August 2023
- Running time: 145 minutes
- Country: India
- Language: Punjabi
- Budget: est.₹10 crore
- Box office: est.₹74 crore

Mastaney is a 2023 Indian Punjabi-language historical action drama film. It stars Tarsem Jassar and Gurpreet Ghuggi with Simi Chahal and Karamjit Anmol in supporting roles.

== Plot ==
Set in 1739, Nader Shah's undefeated army was attacked by Sikh rebellions. Nader demands to arrest them but it doesn't work out. Five ordinary men are hired to play Sikh rebels but over time they learn what Sikhs are.

== Cast ==
- Tarsem Jassar as Zahoor
- Gurpreet Ghuggi as Qalandar
  - Sameep Ranaut as Young Qalandar
- Rahul Dev as Nader Shah
- Simi Chahal as Noor
- Karamjit Anmol as Basheer
- Honey Mattu as Zulfi
- Baninder Bunny as Feena
- Avtar Gill as Zakariya Khan Bahadur
- Arif Zakaria as Zakariya Khan's wazir
- Rahul Jaitly as Morteza Mirza Afshar
- Shivam Sharma as Durlab
- Parmjeet Singh as Nihang Singh Jathedar
- Gursher Singh as Nihang Singh

== Soundtrack ==
=== Track List ===
No.	Title	Lyrics	Music	Length
1.	"Shehzada" (Tarsem Jassar, Amrit Maan & Kulbir Jhinjer featuring Pavitar Lassoi & Kanwar Grewal)	Tarsem Jassar	Mix Singh	3:10
2.	"Masti" (Tarsem Jassar)	T. Jassar	Mix Singh	2:26
3.	"Bahu" (Saieen Zahoor)	Sultan Bahu	Mix Singh	2:23
4.	"Panth Maharaj Ke" (Tarsem Jassar, Jatha Bhai Mehal Singh)	Gurbani	Mr Rubal	2:36
Total length:				10:35

== Release ==
=== Theatrical ===
The film was theatrically released worldwide on 25 August 2023 in Punjabi, along with dubbed versions Hindi, Telugu, Tamil and Marathi.

=== Home release ===
The film was released on OTT streaming service Chaupal on 9 November 2023.

== Reception ==
=== Critical reception ===
Jaspreet Nijher of The Times of India gave the rating of 4/5 and wrote "The film is a huge effort for the Punjabi industry to emerge from the tag of comics. Though it requires more depth in its building up of the commoners to becoming warriors, the story engages with its grand cinematography and martial display in the climax. The music is another highlight that captures with its undertones of Mughal influence and Sikh hues." Sukhpreet Kahlon of The Indian Express gave 3.5 stars out of 5 and wrote "Beginning with a wide historical perspective that looks at the origins of Sikhism, Mastaney moves towards the rise of the Sikh empire. Placed within that perspective, it almost feels like an origin story, with stories of Maharaja Ranjit Singh and the glory of the Sikh empire to follow." Nidhi Pal of Amar Ujala gave 3 out of 5 and praised performances, cinematography but criticised music.

== Sequel ==
Mastaney 2 was officially announced by Jassar in September 2026, and is set to be released on 14 April 2028.
