= Babe Bhangra Paunde Ne =

2022 Indian Punjabi-language film

- Theatrical release poster
- Directed by: Amarjit Singh Saron
- Screenplay by: Amarjit Singh Saron; Naresh Kathooria
- Story by: Naresh Kathooria
- Produced by: Diljit Dosanjh; Daljit Thind
- Starring: Diljit Dosanjh; Sohail Ahmed; Sargun Mehta
- Cinematography: Baljit Singh Deo
- Edited by: Rohit Dhiman
- Music by: Avvy Sra
- Production companies: Thind Motion Films; Storytime Productions
- Release date: 5 October 2022
- Running time: 135 minutes
- Country: India
- Language: Punjabi
- Box office: ₹32.11 crore

Babe Bhangra Paunde Ne is an Indian Punjabi comedy film directed by Amarjit Singh Saron. It stars Diljit Dosanjh, Sargun Mehta and Sohail Ahmed with Gurpreet Bhangu, Jassica Gill and Bhavkhandan Singh Rakhra in supporting roles. The film depicts the story of three friends who try to adopt an orphaned old man in order to swindle him of his insurance money and become rich.

The film was released on 5 October 2022 in India and Canada.

== Plot ==
Jaggi and his friends are portrayed as being on a mission to become rich and successful. They come up with various ideas, such as innovative underwear and machines to instantly produce butter and ghee. They attempt to secure investments from Jaggi's girlfriend Mithi's father, but their efforts fail, leading to Mithi breaking up with Jaggi.

They then fixate on the idea of acquiring an elderly man and obtaining his life insurance, allowing them to legally claim money after his death. Disguised as businessmen, they visit an old age home and quickly become close to the residents, all the while searching for someone who appears to be near death. They select Iqbal, whose kidneys have failed and whose liver is infected. After getting him insured, they wait for the paperwork to process. Unfortunately, the old man refuses to die and even wins a marathon race. In desperation, Jaggi decides to adopt another resident, but the plan backfires, leaving him overwhelmed with the entire nursing home of seniors in his rented house, along with their caretaker. During this chaos, Jaggi falls for Preet.

When his finances run low, Jaggi approaches an Asian gangster for money, who suggests that he steal the Queen's crown at an upcoming event. Jaggi agrees and enlists the help of the seniors, all without Preet's knowledge. The heist is successful, but Preet discovers the truth, along with a shocking revelation from Jaggi's frustrated friend, Bhullar: the seniors were adopted solely for their insurance money. The group leaves in anger, and Jaggi learns that Iqbal's kidneys have failed. He rushes to the hospital, begs for forgiveness, and offers one of his own kidneys. The film concludes with the group reunited and Iqbal as fit as ever.

== Cast ==
- Diljit Dosanjh as Jaggi
- Sohail Ahmed as Iqbal
- Sargun Mehta as Preet
- Sangtar Singh as Bhullar
- Kaul Lakhan as Koki
- Gurpreet Bhangu
- Jassica Gill
- Balinder Johal
- Devinder Dillon
- Bhavkhandan Singh Rakhra
- Navi Brar as Mithi

== Production and release ==
The film is Diljit Dosanjh's home production where he launched his banner Thind Motion Films along with Storytime Productions.
