= Satinder Sartaaj =

Indian singer

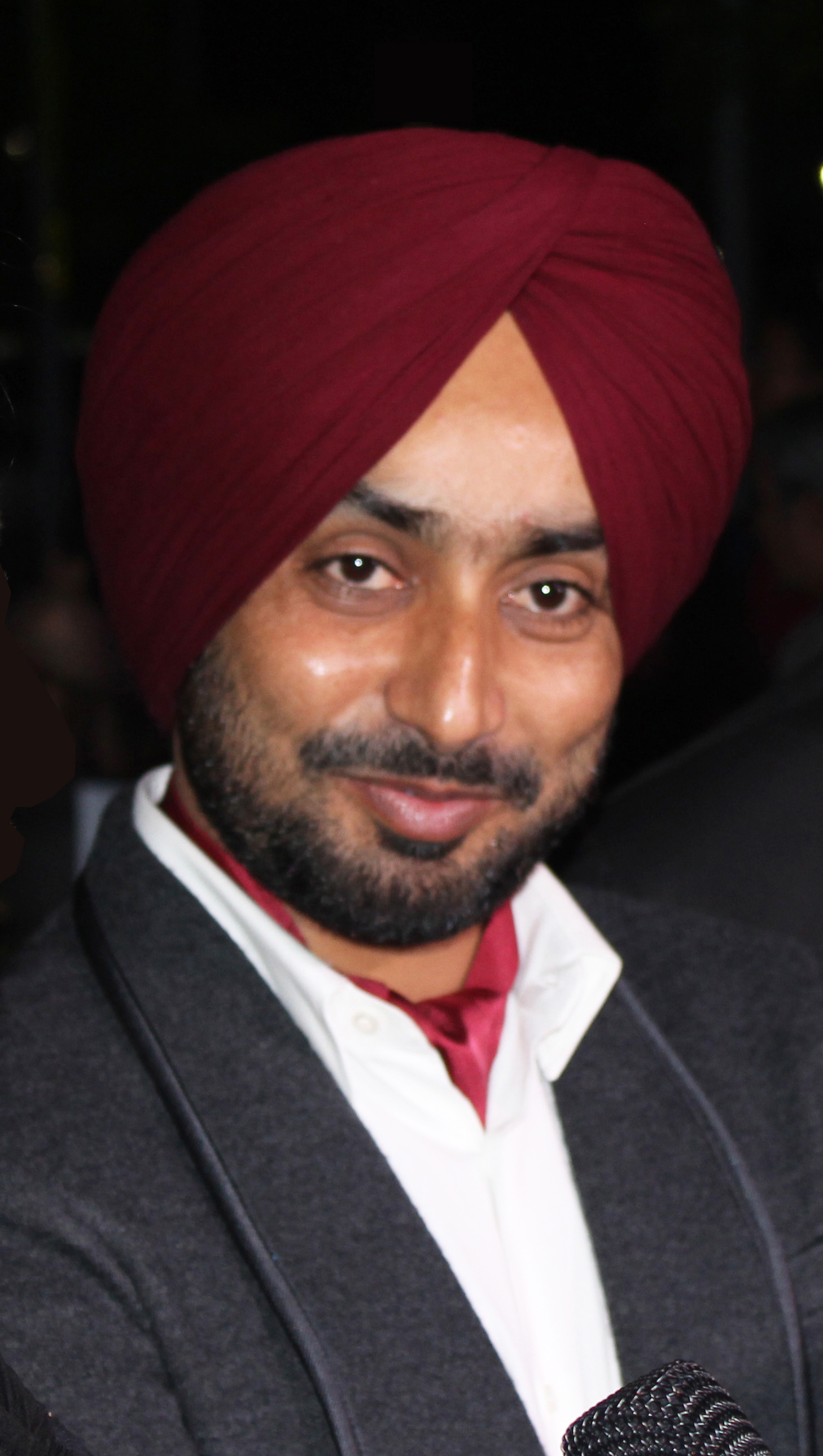
- Satinder Sartaaj at 18th IIFA Awards, East Rutherford, New Jersey, US

Background information
- Also known as: Satinder Sartaaj
- Born: Satinder Pal Singh; Bajrawar, Hoshiarpur, Punjab, India
- Genres: Sufi; folk music
- Occupations: Singer; poet; actor; composer; dancer
- Instruments: Vocals, harmonium, chimta, Saaz-e-Sartaaj (his self-created musical instrument)
- Years active: 2003–present
- Website: satindersartaaj.com

Satinder Pal Singh, popularly known as Satinder Sartaaj, is an Indian singer, songwriter, actor and poet primarily associated with Punjabi songs and films. He gained fame with his song "Sai" and, since then has performed across the world. Sartaaj made his film debut portraying Maharaja Duleep Singh in The Black Prince in 2017.

== Early life ==
Satinder Pal Singh was born in the village of Bajrawar in Hoshiarpur, Punjab. He attended school at the government elementary school in his village. While in the third standard, he began performing in local Bal Sabhas.

== Education ==
Sartaaj obtained an honours degree in music from Government College, Hoshiarpur. He concentrated on his musical career while completing his MPhil in Sufi music singing and later a PhD in Sufi singing (Gayan) from Panjab University, Chandigarh. He also taught music at Panjab University for six years. Sartaaj also completed a certificate course and Diploma in the Persian language. He started writing poetry and adopted his Takhallus (pen name), Sartaaj, while at college.

== Career ==
Sartaaj pursued a professional music career in his 20s. Before this, he has stated he was a farmer and had no interest in pursuing a career as a performer.

His big performance break was in 2008 when he got booked for a gig in Toronto, Ontario. The show's organisers had heard him singing on YouTube and wanted him to perform for the Punjabi-Canadian audience.

In 2011, Sartaaj won "Best International Act" at the Brit Asia TV Music Awards (BAMA).

On 2 May 2014, Sartaaj performed in the Royal Albert Hall. He won "Best Songwriter" again at BAMA 2017 and "Music Video of the Year" at BAMA 2018 for "Udaarian".

He debuted in the American film industry with the lead role in the movie The Black Prince, a historic biopic of Maharaja Duleep Singh which was released on 21 July 2017. He has also acted in Punjabi films including Ikko Mikke (2020) and Kali Jotta (2023).

== Philosophy ==
Although he has taught at the university and is an accomplished bhangra performer, composer, and singer, Sartaaj considers shayari (poetry) as his first love.

== Discography ==
=== Film ===
Year	Song	Film	Composer(s)	Singer(s)	Lyrics
2023	"Jalsa 2.0"	Mission Raniganj	Satinder Sartaaj, Prem-Hardeep		Satinder Sartaaj
2025	"Rang"	Sky Force	Tanishk Bagchi	Satinder Sartaaj, Zahrah S. Khan	Shloke Lal
2026	"Jaiye Sajana"	Dhurandhar: The Revenge	Shashwat Sachdev	Satinder Sartaaj, Jasmine Sandlas	
2026	"Challa"	Maati Season 2	Beat Minister	Satinder Sartaaj	

=== Albums ===
Year	Album	Music	Record label
2010	Sartaaj		Speed Records
2011	Cheerey Wala Sartaaj		Moviebox Birmingham Limited
2012	Tere Qurbaan		Finetone Cassette Industries
2013	Afsaaney Sartaaj De	Jatinder Shah	Firdaus Production
2014	Rangrez -The Poet of Colors	Partners in Rhyme	Sony Music
2016–2017	Hazaarey Wala Munda	Jatinder Shah	Shemaroo Entertainment Limited
2018	Seasons of Sartaaj	Jatinder Shah	Saga Music
2019–2021	Seven Rivers	Beat Minister	Saga Music
2021	Tehreek	Beat Minister	Saga Music
2023	Shayrana Sartaaj		Satinder Sartaaj (YouTube channel)
2024	Travel Diaries		Speed Records
2024	Travel Diaries Vol II		Satinder Sartaaj (YouTube channel)
2025	Travel Diaries Vol III - Saugaat		Satinder Sartaaj (YouTube channel)
2025	Liberation	JCD Production, Black Virus	Satinder Sartaaj (YouTube channel)
2026	The Perfumed Moments		Satinder Sartaaj (YouTube channel)

=== Singles ===
Year	Single	Music	Record label
2009	Ibadat	Ranveer Sandhu	Finetone Cassette Industries
2012	Sartaaj Live		Speed Records
2015	Hamza – A Sufiana Ecstasy		Firdaus Productions
2017	Masoomiyat	Beat Minister	T-Series
2019	Shagufta Dili	Beat Minister	YRF
2019	Aarti (Aqeedat-e-Sartaaj)	Beat Minister	Saga Music
2020	Zafarnamah- Letter of Victory (By Guru Gobind Singh Ji)	Beat Minister	Firdaus production
2020	Kuchh Badal Geya Ey	Beat Minister	YRF Music
2020	Auzaar	Beat Minister	Saga Music
2021	Qanoon	Beat Minister	Saga Music
2021	Pakeezgi	Beat Minister	T-Series
2021	Planet Punjab	Beat Minister	Satinder Sartaaj (YouTube channel)
2021	Shava Ni Girdhari Lal	Jatinder Shah	Humble Music
2022	Kamaal Ho Gea	Manan Bhardwaj	T-Series
2022	Nadan Jehi Aas	Beat Minister	Firdaus production
2022	Dil Gaunda Firda	Beat Minister	T-Series
2022	Titli	Beat Minister	Jugnu
2022	Zara Faasley Te	Beat Minister	Jugnu
2022	Jaan Ke Bhuleke	Beat Minister	Jugnu
2023	Galla'n Ee Ney	Jatinder Shah	Universal Music India
2023	Paris Di Jugni (title track)	Partners in Rhythm	T-Series
2024	Bulbul	Beat Minister	Saregama
2024	Japji Sahib	Traditional	Satinder Sartaaj (YouTube channel)
2024	Bulauna Ni Aaya	Beat Minister	Saregama
2024	Ilahi Rangey	Prem & Hardeep	Saregama
2025	Koh-Faq	Prem & Hardeep	Satinder Sartaaj (YouTube channel)
2025	Aalam-Aara	Beat Minister	Satinder Sartaaj (YouTube channel)
2025	Benazir - The Unparalleled	JCD Production	Satinder Sartaaj (YouTube channel)
2025	Hind Ki Chadar	JCD Production	Satinder Sartaaj (YouTube channel)
2026	Aa Sajan	Prem & Hardeep	Speed Records
2026	Guzarish	Goldie Sohel	T-Series

== Filmography ==
Year	Film	Role	Notes
2017	The Black Prince	Maharaja Duleep Singh	American film
2020	Ikko Mikke	Nihaal	Punjabi film
2023	Kali Jotta	Deedar	Punjabi film
2024	Shayar	Satta	Punjabi film
2025	Hoshiar Singh	Hoshiar Singh	Punjabi film
