= Sonam Bajwa =

Indian actress (born 1989)

- Bajwa in 2026
- Born: 16 August 1989 (age 37); Nainital, Uttar Pradesh (now Uttarakhand), India
- Education: University of Delhi
- Occupation: Actress
- Years active: 2013–present

Sonampreet Bajwa (born 16 August 1989) is an Indian actress who predominantly works in Punjabi and Hindi films. One of the highest paid actresses of Punjabi cinema, She is the recipient of one PTC Punjabi Film Awards and has received four nominations for Filmfare Awards Punjabi.

After participating in the 2012 Femina Miss India contest, Bajwa made her acting debut with the Punjabi film Best Of Luck (2013) and made her Tamil film debut with Kappal. Bajwa established herself as a leading actor in Punjabi films with successful films such as Punjab 1984 (2014), Sardaar Ji 2 (2016), Nikka Zaildar (2016), Manje Bistre (2017), Nikka Zaildar 2 (2017), Carry on Jatta 2 (2018), Guddiyan Patole (2019), Ardab Mutiyaran (2019), and Honsla Rakh (2021). She made her Telugu film debut with Aatadukundam Raa (2016).. In 2025, she expanded into Hindi cinema appearing in the films Housefull 5 and Ek Deewane Ki Deewaniyat. Bajwa won the PTC Punjabi Film Award for Best Actress for her performance in Ardab Mutiyaran. She has also received two Filmfare Awards Punjabi – Best Actress nomination for Manje Bistre and Nikka Zaildar 2.

== Early life ==
Sonam Bajwa was born on 16 August 1989 in Nainital, Uttar Pradesh (now in Uttarakhand) in a Punjabi Sikh family. She completed her graduation at Delhi University. In 2012, she moved to Mumbai and participated in the Femina Miss India contest. Bajwa then became an air hostess, but later quit it to pursue a career in acting.

== Career ==
=== Debut and established actress in Punjabi films (2013–2024) ===
Bajwa made her acting debut with Best Of Luck in 2013 alongside Gippy Grewal and Jazzy B. In 2014, she worked in Punjab 1984 opposite Diljit Dosanjh. She made her Tamil film debut with Kappal opposite Vaibhav the same year.

Bajwa had four films in 2016 - Sardaar Ji 2 opposite Diljit Dosanjh, Nikka Zaildar opposite Ammy Virk, Born to Be King opposite Ateesh Randev and her Telugu debut Aatadukundam Raa opposite Sushanth. In 2017, she appeared opposite Gippy Grewal in Manje Bistre, opposite Dosanjh Super Singh and opposite Ammy Virk in Nikka Zaildar 2. In 2018, she appeared in Carry on Jatta 2, opposite Grewal.

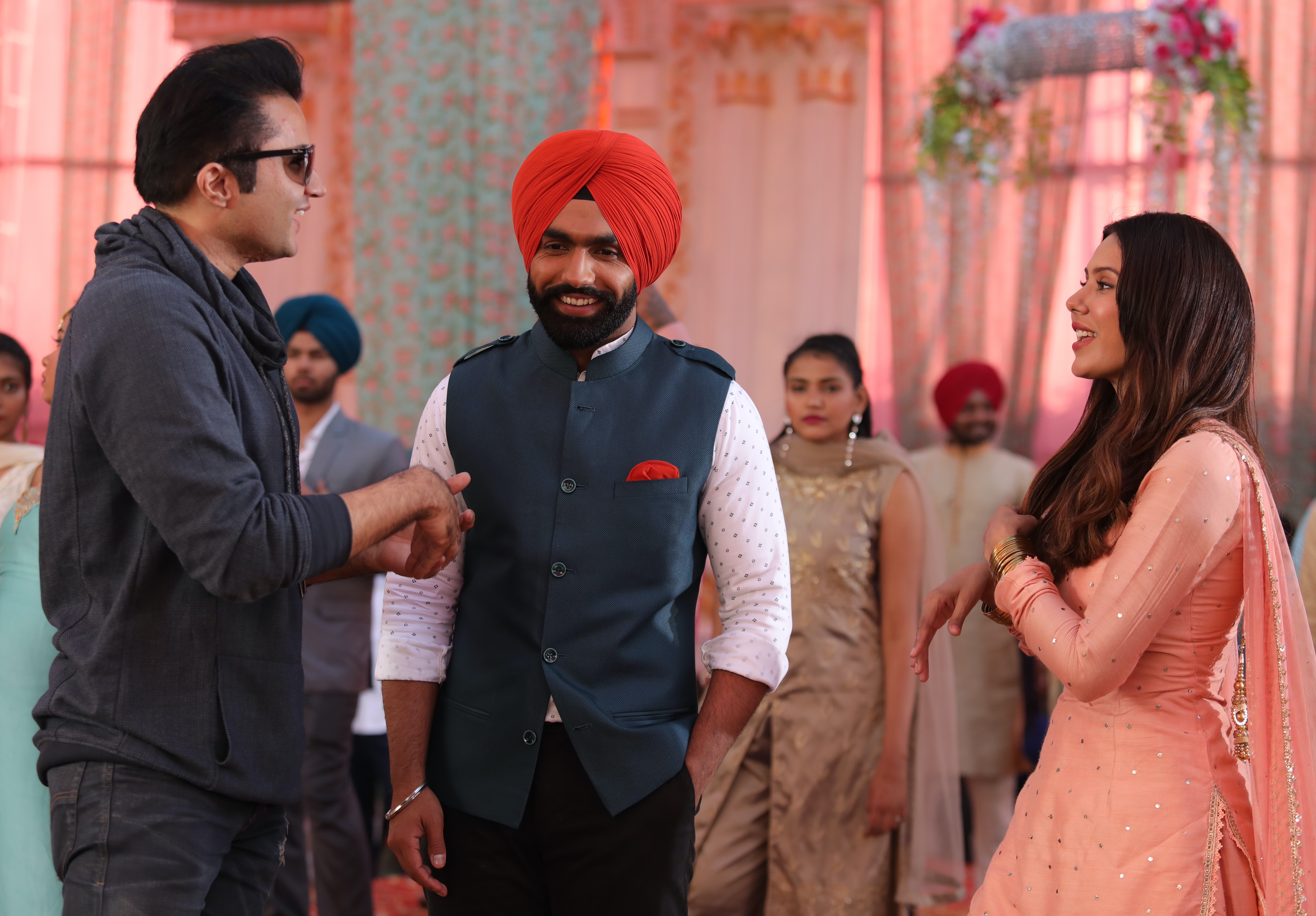
Bajwa with Ammy Virk on the set of Puaada (2021)

Bajwa worked in five films in 2019. She worked in Guddiyan Patole opposite Gurnam Bhullar, Muklawa opposite Virk, Singham opposite Parmish Verma, Ardab Mutiyaran opposite Ajay Sarkaria and Bala opposite Ayushmann Khurrana. She won the PTC Punjabi Film Award for Best Actress for Ardab Mutiyaran. In 2020, she appeared in Jinde Meriye opposite Parmish Verma. In 2021, she appeared opposite Virk in Puaada and opposite Dosanjh in Honsla Rakh.

In 2022, she played the lead opposite Gurnam Bhullar in Mai Vyah Nahi Karona Tere Naal, opposite Virk in Sher Bagga, opposite Ajay Sarkaria in Jind Mahi and opposite Vaibhav in Kaatteri. In 2023, she played a lead role in Godday Godday Chaa and Carry On Jatta 3. In 2024, she played the lead opposite Virk in Kudi Haryane Val Di.

=== Expansion to Hindi films (2025–present) ===
In 2025, Bajwa made her debut in Hindi films with Housefull 5 opposite Riteish Deshmukh. The film was released in two versions, titled Housefull 5A and Housefull 5B, each featuring a different climax and murderer. Devesh Sharma stated that she adds to the "glamour quotient", but has nothing to do in the film. A commercial success, it emerged as one of the highest grossing film of the year. Following this, she played a bar dancer in Baaghi 4 opposite Tiger Shroff. Shachi Chaturvedi stated, "Sonam enters with some promise, but her character never gets the space to grow. Despite this limitation, she delivers a decent performance. The film, however, underperformed at the box office and emerged as a commercial failure."

In the same year, Bajwa starred opposite Harshvardhan Rane in Ek Deewane Ki Deewaniyat a romantic drama film that received positive audience feedback for its emotional storytelling and intense chemistry between the lead pair. Critics appreciated Bajwa’s heartfelt portrayal, calling it one of her most expressive performances to date..

== In the media ==
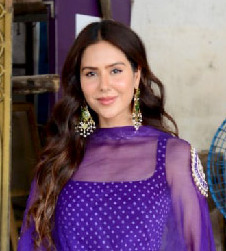
Bajwa in 2023

Bajwa is considered one of the highest-paid and prominent actresses of Punjabi cinema. She is also known for her fashion sense and styling. In the film Guddiyan Patole, Bajwa was the highest paid actor, receiving more than her male counterparts. Bajwa became the Chandigarh Times' Most Desirable Woman thrice in 2016, 2017 and 2019. She also ranked 2nd in 2018 and 4th in 2020 in the same list. In the Times' 50 Most Desirable Woman list, Bajwa ranked 44th in 2019. She is the celebrity endorser for brands including Moofarm and Americana biscuits.

== Personal life ==
Although born in a Punjabi Sikh family, in 2017, Bajwa announced on social media that she follows Jesus, but is not a religious Christian. She stated "I follow Jesus but I am not a religious Christian."

== Filmography ==
Key
†	Denotes films that have not yet been released

=== Films ===
Year	Title	Role	Language	Notes	Ref.
2013	Best Of Luck	Simran	Punjabi		
2014	Punjab 1984	Jeeti	Punjabi		
2014	Kappal	Deepika	Tamil		
2015	Sardaar Ji	Herself	Punjabi	Special appearance in song "Veervaar"	
2016	Sardaar Ji 2	Diljyot	Punjabi		
2016	Babu Bangaram	Herself	Telugu	Special appearance in song "Dhandame Ettukuntam"	
2016	Aatadukundam Raa	Shruthi	Telugu		
2016	Nikka Zaildar	Manraaj Kaur	Punjabi		
2016	Born to Be King	Preet	Punjabi		
2017	Manje Bistre	Rano	Punjabi		
2017	Super Singh	Twinkle	Punjabi		
2017	Nikka Zaildar 2	Roop Kaur	Punjabi		
2018	Carry on Jatta 2	Meet	Punjabi		
2019	Guddiyan Patole	Kashmeer "Kash" Kaur	Punjabi		
2019	Muklawa	Taaro	Punjabi		
2019	Shadaa	Herself	Punjabi	Special appearance in song, "Tommy"	
2019	Singham	Dr. Nikki	Punjabi		
2019	Ardab Mutiyaran	Babbu Bains Bansal	Punjabi		
2019	Bala	Swasti	Hindi		
2020	Jinde Meriye	Rehmat	Punjabi		
2020	Street Dancer 3D	Pammi Kaur Chaddha	Hindi	Cameo	
2021	Puaada	Raunak	Punjabi		
2021	Honsla Rakh	Jasmine	Punjabi		
2022	Mai Vyah Nahi Karona Tere Naal	Mannat	Punjabi		
2022	Sher Bagga	Gulaab Kaur	Punjabi		
2022	Jind Mahi	Lakhwinder "Laddo" Kaur	Punjabi		
2022	Kaatteri	Shwetha	Tamil		
2023	Godday Godday Chaa	Rani	Punjabi		
2023	Carry on Jatta 3	Meet	Punjabi		
2024	Kudi Haryane Val Di	Neelam Dahiya	Punjabi		
2025	Housefull 5	Zara Akhtar	Hindi		
2025	Baaghi 4	Olivia/Prathistha	Hindi		
2025	Nikka Zaildar 4	Angel	Punjabi		
2025	Ek Deewane Ki Deewaniyat	Adaa Randhawa	Hindi		
2026	Border 2	Manjit Kaur Sekhon	Hindi		
2026	Pitt Siyapa	Nimmi	Punjabi		
2027	Ranna Ch Dhanna †	TBA	Punjabi		

=== Television ===
Year	Title	Role	Language	Notes
2021	Dil Diyan Gallan	Host	Punjabi	
2024	Laughter Chefs – Unlimited Entertainment	Herself	Hindi	Guest appearance

=== Music video appearances ===
Year	Song	Artist	Director	Label
2020	"Jatti Jeoni Morh Wargi"	Sidhu Moose Wala	Agam Mann	White Hill Music
2020	"Surma"	Diljit Dosanjh	Arvindr Khaira	Sony Music India
2021	"Brown Shortie"	Sidhu Moose Wala	Sukh Sanghera	Sidhu Moose Wala
2025	"Naah Goriye"	Jaani	Aniket Parpillewar	Sony Music India

== Awards and nominations ==
Year	Award	Category	Film	Result	Ref.
2014	4th PTC Punjabi Film Awards	Best Female Debut	Best of Luck	Nominated	
2017	7th PTC Punjabi Film Awards	Best Supporting Actress	Sardaar Ji 2	Nominated	
2017	1st Filmfare Awards Punjabi	Best Actress	Nikka Zaildar	Nominated	
2018	2nd Filmfare Awards Punjabi	Best Actress	Manje Bistre	Nominated	
2018	2nd Filmfare Awards Punjabi	Best Actress	Nikka Zaildar 2	Nominated	
2018	2nd Filmfare Awards Punjabi	Best Actress – Critics	Nikka Zaildar 2	Nominated	
2018	8th PTC Punjabi Film Awards	Best Actress	Super Singh	Nominated	
2019	9th PTC Punjabi Film Awards	Best Actress	Carry On Jatta 2	Nominated	
2020	10th PTC Punjabi Film Awards	Best Actress	Ardab Mutiyaran	Won	
2022	11th PTC Punjabi Film Awards	Best Actress	Mai Vyah Nahi Karona Tere Naal	Nominated	
2022	11th PTC Punjabi Film Awards	Popular Jodi of the Year (with Gurnam Bhullar)	Mai Vyah Nahi Karona Tere Naal	Won	
2022	11th PTC Punjabi Film Awards	Popular Jodi of the Year (with Diljit Dosanjh)	Honsla Rakh	Nominated	
