= List of Punjabi films of 2013 =

This is a list of Panjabi films of 2013.

== List of films ==
Title	Director	Cast	Genre	Release date	Producer	Audio/video released by	Ref.
Pagri Singh Da Taaj	Balbir Begumpuri, Balwant Singh Suri	Lakhwinder Singh, Pallawi Sharma, Parminder Gill Teji Sandhu, Dharamjeet, Nittu Pander, Bhotu Shah	Religious	4 January 2013	Paramount Arts	T-Series/DVD not released	
Saadi Love Story	Dheeraj Rattan	Diljit Dosanjh, Surveen Chawla, Amrinder Gill, Neetu Singh, Kulbhushan Kharbanda & Dolly Ahluwalia	Romantic Comedy	11 January 2013	Eros Entertainment, Jimmy Shergill Productions, Aman Khatkar	Eros Now/EROS DVD	
Tu Mera 22 Main Tera 22	Amit Prasher	Yo Yo Honey Singh, Amrinder Gill, Mandy Takhar, WamiQa Gabbi, Binnu Dhillon	Comedy	25 January 2013	Joy Bir Singh Kataria, Gunbir Singh Sidhu, HansRaj Ralhan, Pooja Singh	Speed Records/Shemaroo	
Pehchaan 3D	Manny Parmar	Manjit Bath, Karamjit Batth, Gurdip Bhullar, Kabir Brar	Criminal drama	1 February 2013	Manny Parmar & Gurpreet Sohi, Inner Karma Films Ltd.	Daddy Mohan Records/DVD not released	
Stupid 7	Pali Bhupinder Singh	Jaswinder Bhalla, Pukhraj Bhalla, Jasmeet Kaur Karan Sandhawalia, Millind Gaba, Saibi Sodhi, Jannatpreet Kaur, Gunit Cour, Sukhman Brar, Razia Sukhbir, Ramnik Sidhu, Parmod Pabbi	Social Comedy	1 February 2013	Sandeep Kakkar, Naresh Kakkar & Offstage Creations	Goyal Music/Shemaroo	
Sajjan - The Real Friend	Sunil Taneja	K.S. Makhan, Simran Sachdeva, Dilip Tahil, Harry Josh, Sanvi Dhiman	Action/Drama	8 February 2013	Kuldeep Singh Takhar, Takhar Productions	T-Series	
Singh vs Kaur	Navanait Singh	Gippy Grewal, Surveen Chawla, Japji Khera, B.N. Sharma, Binnu Dhillon, Avtar Gill	Comedy/Action	15 February 2013	D. Rama Naidu, Sippy Grewal, Gurfateh films, Suresh Productions	MV Records/Shemaroo	
Pooja... Kiven Aa..???	Nidhi Sharma	Miss Pooja, Tarun Khanna, B.N. Sharma, Sahil Veedoliya, Raj Singh Jhinger, Manoj Joshi, Sardar Sohi, Anita Shadbeesh, Anshul Sawhney, Gitta Bains, Rakhi Sawant [Guest Appearance]	Comedy	22 March 2013	Romo Tahli	Saga Music/Saga Music	
You N Me	Vicky J	Varinder Grewal, Jyotika Thakur, Rana Jang Bahadur, Harpal Singh, Razia Sukhbir, Deputy Raja, Sarita Tiwari	Suspense Romantic Thriller	29 March 2013	Varinder Grewal Productions	Daddy Mohan Records/DVD not released/Video on YouTube	
Sadda Haq	Mandeep Benipal	Kuljinder Sidhu, Gaurav Kakkar, Dhriti Sharan, Parmod Moutho, Yaad Grewal, Dev Kharoud, Dinesh Sood	Drama/Historical	5 April 2013 Punjab- 10 May 2013	Oxl Studio	Oxl/Kumar Films	
Daddy Cool Munde Fool	Simerjit Singh	Amrinder Gill, Harish Verma, Jaswinder Bhalla, Yuvika Chaudhary, Ihana Dhillon, Amar Noorie, Upasana Singh, Rana Ranbir, Karamjit Anmol,	Comedy	12 April 2013	KG Productions, Royal Ent. & VR Productions	Speed Records/Speed Records	
Bikkar Bai Sentimental	Gautam Nagrath	Jassi Jasraj(Karan Jasbir), Preeti Jhangiani, Shahbaz Khan, Bobby Sandhu, Rana Ranbir	Action	19 April 2013	Sandeep Bansal & Kamaljeet Kaur	Sony Music/Sony	
Lucky Di Unlucky Story	Smeep Kang	Gippy Grewal, Gurpreet Ghuggi, Jaswinder Bhalla, Samiksha Singh, & Binnu Dhillon	Comedy	26 April 2013	Gurfateh Films & Sippy Grewal Productions	MV Records/Shemaroo	
Rangeelay	Navaniat Singh	Jimmy Shergill, Neha Dhupia, Binnu Dhillon, Jaswinder Bhalla, Rana Ranbir, Shavinder Mahal, BN Sharma	Romance/Action	17 May 2013	Jimmy Sheirgill Productions	Eros Now/EROS NOW	
Jatts In Golmaal	Ksshitij Chaudhary	Arya Babbar, Samiksha Singh, Veena Malik, Gurpreet Ghuggi, Jaswinder Bhalla, B N Sharma, Binnu Dhillon, Sardar Sohi, Karamjeet Anmol	Comedy	24 May 2013	HM Music	Saga Music/Saga Music	
Oye Hoye Pyar Ho Gaya	Aditya Sood	Sharry Mann, Niharika Kareer, Jimmy Sharma, Binnu Dhillon, Rana Ranbir, Yograj Singh, Bhotu Shah	Romantic Comedy	14 June 2013	Aditya Films Ltd	Speed Records/Speed Records	
Sikander	Jatinder Mahaur	Gul Panag, Kartar Cheema, Manav Vij, Victor John, Nishawn Bhullar, Yaad Garewal	Politics	21 June 2013	Imaginations Entertainment Pvt Limited:Poonam Pawar	Catrack/Kumar Films	
Jatt & Juliet 2	Anurag Singh	Diljit Dosanjh, Neeru Bajwa, Rana Ranbir, Jaswinder Bhalla, Bharti Singh		28 June 2013	Darshan Singh Grewal, Gunbir Singh Sidhu	Speed Records/Shemaroo	
Fer Mamla Gadbad Gadbad	Rimpy Prince	Roshan Prince, Japji Khaira, Bhanushree Mehra, Rana Ranbir, B N Sharma	Romantic Comedy	12 July 2013	PTC Punjabi & PTC Motion Pictures	T-Series/T-Series	
Best of Luck	Sunny Sidhu	Gippy Grewal, Jazzy B, Simran Kaur Mundi, Binnu Dhillon, Puneet Issar, Sonampreet Bajwa, Karamjit Anmol	Action/Comedy	26 July 2013		Speed Records/Shemaroo	
Naughty Jatts	Pankaj Batra	Neeru Bajwa, Arya Babbar, Roshan Prince, Binnu Dhillon, BN Sharma, Karamjit Anmol		2 August 2013	Multiline Entertainment Pvt. Ltd. (Satish Katyal & Sandeep Bhalla)	Times Music/Saga Music	
Punjab Bolda	Ravinder Peepat	Sarbjit Cheema, Anisha Pooja, Amarjit Cheema, Binnu Dhillon, Anshu Sawhney, Shavinder Mahal	Action\Historical	15 August 2013	Parteek Entertainers & Pix-Ray Entertainment	Daddy Mohan Records/Kumar Films	
Jatt Boys Putt Jattan De	Simranjit Singh Hundal	Sippy Gill, Aman Dhaliwal, Om Puri, Rahul Dev, Guggu Gill, Diljeet Kaur, Sohaj Brar, Razia Sukhbir, Sardar Sohi, Mohammad Saddiq, Jaswinder Bhalla, Karamjit Anmol	Action	23 August 2013	Sukhbir Singh Sandhar	Speed Records/Kumar Films	
Jatt Airways	Harjit Singh Ricky	Alfaaz, Tulip Joshi, Binnu Dhillon, Jaswinder Bhalla, B N Sharma, Karamjit Anmol, Manreet Kaur	Comedy/Romance	30 August 2013	Vision India Productions Pvt. Ltd.	Shemaroo/Shemaroo	
Haani	Amitoj Maan	Harbhajan Mann, Sarbjit Cheema, Mahreen Kaleka, Sonia Mann, Anuj Sachdeva, Sardar Sohi, Rupan Bal, Manpreet Akhtar	Romance/Action/Cultural	6 September 2013	Mannerism Productions	Saga Music/Saga Music	
Viyah 70 KM	Mushtaq Pasha	Harish Verma, Geeta Zaildar, Binnu Dhillon, Jaswinder Bhalla, Ranjeet, Aarti Chhabria, Razia Sukhbir, Sezal Sharma.	Romantic/ Darama/ Comedy	13 September 2013	Vivek Ohri and Rajan Batra	Speed Records/Kumar Films	
Dil Pardesi Ho Gaya	Thakur Tapasvi	Inderjit Nikku, Sana Khan, Shakti Kapoor, Jaspal Bhatti, Daljeet Kaur, Raza Murad, Akshay Kumar sp, Sanjay Dutt sp		20 September 2013	Raj KumarVerka	Times Music/DVD not released	
Young Malang	Rajdeep Singh	Balli Riar, Yuvraj Hans, Vinaypal Buttar, Anita Kailey, Neetu Singh, Anjana Sukhani, Yograj Singh, Chacha Raunqi Ram, Kiran Kumar	Comedy	20 September 2013	RSG Studios	Saga Music/Saga Music	
Nabar	Rajeev Sharma	Nishawn Bhullar, Rana Ranbir, Hardeep Gill, Harbinder Kaur Babli	Drama/Family/Truth	27 September 2013		Catrack/DVD not released/Video on YouTube	
Aashiqui Not Allowed		Amaan Sutdhar, B.N Sharma, Gurpreet Kaur, Harinakshi, Gurchet Chitarkar, Jaswant Singh Rathore		27 September 2013	Sikandra Films	Daddy Mohan Records/Shemaroo	
Jatt in Mood	Sukhjinder Shera	Raj Brar, Harpreet Dhillon, Sukhjinder Shera, Manreet, Manni Boparai, Jaswinder Bhalla, Karamjeet	Comedy	4 October 2013	Gobind Arts, Sukhjinder Shera	Pep Up Entertainment/Mital Films	
RSVP - Ronde Saare Viah Picho	Vijay Kumar Arora	Neeru Bajwa, Harish Verma, Guggu Gill, Charoo Kapoor, Rajpal Yadav, Jaswinder Bhalla, Navneet Nishan, Arvinder Bhatti, Rana Ranbir	Romantic Comedy	11 October 2013	Himmat Singh (Himmat Ventures) and Aparna Sood	Speed Records/DVD not released/Video on YouTube	
Heer and Hero	Sagar S. Sharma	Manissha Lamba, Arya Babbar, Gurpreet Ghuggi, Hazel Keech, Preet Bhullar, Manoj Pahwa, Yograj Singh, Mukul Dev	Romantic Comedy	18 October 2013	Harjeet Bhullar, Etch B	Shemaroo/Shemaroo	
Ishq Garaari	Dheeraj Rattan	Sharry Maan, Gulzar Inder Chahal, Rannvijay Singh, Vinaypal Buttar, Mandy Takhar, Miss Pooja, Gunjan Walia, Prabhleen Sandhu	Romance\Love	25 October 2013	Cosmic Studio & Mirus Motion Pictures	Shemaroo/Shemaroo	
Tere Te Dil Sadda Lutteya Gaya		Ashmit Patel, Jividha, Pooja Tandon, Mangi Mahal		8 November 2013	Angad and Nice Heart Production, Sapphire Group	T-Series/DVD not Released	
Hay O Rabba Ishaq Na Hove	Sangeet Kumar	Masha Ali, Jaswinder Gardner, Shri Kankani, Muskan, Pramod Moutho, Shakti Kapoor, K.K. Goswami, Amritpal, Nitin, Gulshan Chopra, V.K. Rajdan		8 November 2013	Anmol Productions, Hargovind Tripathi	ACD & DVD not Released	
Bhaji in Problem	Smeep Kang	Gippy Grewal, Ragini Khanna, Akshay Kumar, Gurpreet Ghuggi, B.N. Sharma, Jaswinder Bhalla	Comedy	15 November 2013	Viacom 18 Media Pvt. Ltd., Grazing Goat Pictures	T-Series/T-Series	
Just U & Me		Gitaz Bindrakhia, Priyal Gor, Chandrachur Singh, Jaswinder Bhalla, Deepshikha		6 December 2013	Sangeet Entertainers	Vvanjhali Records	
Love Yoou Soniye		Karanvir Bohra, Teejay Sidhu, Vindu Dara Singh, Raghu Ram	Romantic Comedy	6 December 2013	Firebird Entertainment		
Rab Ton Sohna Ishq	Vicky J	Mandeep mandy, Avantika hundal, Milind gunaji, Rana jung bahadhur, Harpal singh, Deputy raja, Suhki	Action Romantic	13 December 2013	Mandeep Mandy Films		
Risky Mundey		Panna Gill, Shiraz Khan, Uday Gill	Murder Mystery	13 December 2013	ABG Entertainment Pvt Ltd		
