= Naresh Kathooria =

Indian writer and actor

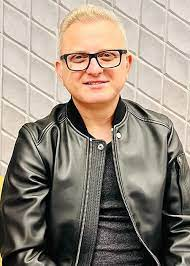
- Born: 26 July; Giddarbaha, Muktsar, Punjab, India
- Education: Punjabi University, Patiala
- Occupations: Writer; Actor; Comedian
- Children: 1
- Notable work: Carry On Jatta; Lucky Di Unlucky Story; Bha Ji in Problem; Uda Aida

Comedy career
- Genres: Films; Comedy; Television

Naresh Kathooria (born: 26 July) is an Indian Punjabi film writer, producer, and actor. He is known for Lucky Di Unlucky Story (2013), Carry on Jatta (2012), Bha Ji in Problem (2013) and Uda Aida (2019), Chandigarh Amritsar Chandigarh (2019) and Chakk De Phatte (2008).

== Early life ==
Naresh was born on 26 July in Giddarbaha, Muktsar, Punjab, India. He graduated from Punjabi University Patiala, Punjab, India.

== Career ==
Kathooria started his career as a theatre actor and always want to be a part of Punjabi film industry. After growing his acting skills on stage, he just started as screenwriter on theater. Naresh also did some famous TV shows like Comedy Circus. He got fame just after completion of blockbuster Indian Punjabi film Carry On Jatta (2012) and got offer from Bollywood but Naresh prefer to work with Indian Punjabi film industry.

== Filmography ==
Key
†	Denotes films that have not yet been released

=== Actor ===
Year	Title	Role
2008	Lakh Pardesi Hoiye	
2012	Pata Nahi Rabb Kehdeyan Rangan Ch Raazi	Mark
2013	Best of Luck	Doctor
2013	Bha Ji in Problem	
2014	Mr & Mrs 420	
2014	Double Di Trouble	
2016	Vaisakhi List	Cyclist 2
2017	Tabbar Punjab Da	
2018	Carry On Jatta 2	
2018	Mr & Mrs 420 Returns	Gogi Mastana
2022	Honeymoon	Jass
2025	Happy Khush Ho Gaya	

=== Writer ===
Year	Title	Language	Notes
2008	Chakk De Phatte	Punjabi	Co-Screenwriter with Amberdeep Singh and Smeep Kang, Co-Dialogue Writer with Amberdeep Singh
2012	Carry on Jatta	Punjabi	Co-Screenwriter with Smeep Kang, Dialogue Writer
2013	Lucky Di Unlucky Story	Punjabi	Co-Screenwriter with Smeep Kang and Vaibhav Suman, Dialogue Writer
2013	Jatts in Golmaal	Punjabi	Story, Screenplay and Dialogues
2013	Best of Luck	Punjabi	
2013	Naughty Jatts	Punjabi	
2013	Viyah 70 Km	Punjabi	
2013	Bha Ji in Problem	Punjabi	
2014	Mr & Mrs 420	Punjabi	
2014	Double Di Trouble	Punjabi	
2015	Munde Kamaal De	Punjabi	
2016	Channo Kamli Yaar Di	Punjabi	
2016	Vaisakhi List	Punjabi	Dialogues
2017	Tabbar Punjab Da	Punjabi	
2017	Vekh Baraatan Challiyan	Punjabi	Story, Screenplay and Dialogues
2018	Carry On Jatta 2	Punjabi	Dialogue
2018	Mr & Mrs 420 Returns	Punjabi	Story, Screenplay and Dialogues
2019	Uda Aida	Punjabi	
2019	Manje Bistre 2	Punjabi	Dialogues
2019	Chandigarh Amritsar Chandigarh	Punjabi	Dialogues
2019	Daaka	Punjabi	Dialogues
2021	Jinne Jamme Saare Nikamme	Punjabi	Story, Screenplay and Dialogues
2021	Paani Ch Madhaani	Punjabi	Story, Screenplay and Dialogues
2022	Yaar Mera Titliaan Warga	Punjabi	Story, Screenplay and Dialogues
2022	Babe Bhangra Paunde Ne	Punjabi	
2023	Carry on Jatta 3	Punjabi	Dialogue
2023	Dream Girl 2	Hindi	Co-screenwriter with Raaj Shaandilyaa
2023	Gaddi Jaandi Ae Chalaangaan Maardi	Punjabi	
2023	Maujaan Hi Maujaan	Punjabi	Dialogue
2025	Happy Khush Ho Gaya	Punjabi	

=== Producer ===
Year	Title	Language	Notes
2019	Uda Aida	Punjabi	
