= Vadhayiyaan Ji Vadhayiyaan =

- Theatrical release poster
- Directed by: Smeep Kang
- Written by: Shreya Srivastava, Vaibhav Suman, Rakesh Dhawan
- Produced by: Atul Bhalla; Amit Bhalla; Binnu Dhillon
- Starring: Binnu Dhillon; Kavita Kaushik; Jaswinder Bhalla; Gurpreet Ghuggi; Karamjit Anmol
- Cinematography: Demel Xavier edwards
- Edited by: Ajay Sharma
- Music by: Jatinder Shah
- Production companies: A & A Advisors; Naughty Men Production
- Distributed by: Omjee Group
- Release date: 13 July 2018 (India)
- Running time: 122 minutes
- Country: India
- Language: Punjabi
- Box office: ₹20.15 crore (US$2.1 million)

Vadhayiyaan Ji Vadhayiyaan (English: Congratulations, yes congratulations) is a 2018 Punjabi film directed by Smeep Kang starring Binnu Dhillon and Kavita Kaushik.

== Cast ==
- Binnu Dhillon as Pargat
- Kavita Kaushik as Gagan
- Jaswinder Bhalla as Bhullar (Gagan's Father)
- Gurpreet Ghuggi as Sukhi
- Karamjit Anmol as Honey
- B.N. Sharma as Pargat's Father

== Soundtrack ==
Vadhayiyaan Ji Vdhayiyaan

Soundtrack album by Jatinder Shah
- Released: 2018
- Genre: Feature film soundtrack
- Language: Punjabi
- Label: White Hill Music

Jatinder Shah chronology
Laatu (2018)	''Vadhayiyaan Ji Vdhayiyaan'' (2018)	Ashke (2018)

=== Track listing ===
No.	Title	Lyrics	Music	Singer(s)	Length
1.	"Akh Surme Di"	Vinder Nathumajra	Jatinder Shah	Ammy Virk; Raman Romana	3:35
2.	"Akh Ladgayi"	Happy Raikoti	Jatinder Shah	Gippy Grewal; Gurlez Akhtar	3:43
3.	"Jind"	Kuldeep Kandiara	Jatinder Shah	Karamjit Anmol; Sunidhi Chauhan	4:40
4.	"Heeriyaan Di Khaan"	Happy Raikoti	Jatinder Shah	Ammy Virk; Gurlez Akhtar	3:06
5.	"Vadhayiyaan Ji Vadhayiyaan"	Balvir Boparai	Jatinder Shah	Nachhatar Gill	3:02
Total length:					00:17:26

== Release ==
Film was released worldwide on 13 July 2018 distributed by Omjee Group.
