= Maujaan Hi Maujaan =

2023 Indian Punjabi-language film

- Theatrical release poster
- Directed by: Smeep Kang
- Written by: Naresh Kathooria
- Story by: Shreya Srivastava; Vaibhav Suman
- Produced by: Amardeep Grewal
- Starring: Gippy Grewal; Tanu Grewal
- Cinematography: Baljit Singh Deo
- Edited by: Rohit Dhiman
- Production companies: East Sunshine Productions; SSR Picture Ltd
- Distributed by: Omjee Cine world
- Release date: 20 October 2023
- Running time: 150 minutes
- Country: India
- Language: Punjabi

Maujaan Hi Maujaan (translation: Fun Only Fun) is a 2023 Indian Punjabi-language, comedy drama film directed by Smeep Kang. It is produced by Amardeep Grewal under East Sunshine Productions and SSR Picture Ltd. The film stars Gippy Grewal and Tanu Grewal in the lead roles. Initially, the film was scheduled to be released on 8 September 2023, but the film was theatrically released on 20 October 2023.

== Cast ==
- Gippy Grewal
- Tanu Grewal
- Binnu Dhillon
- Karamjit Anmol
- Jimmy Sharma
- B. N. Sharma
- Nasir Chinyoti
- Yograj Singh
- Hashneen Chauhan

== Production ==
In November 2022, the film was announced with Gippy Grewal, Binnu Dhillon, Tanu Grewal, Hashneen Chauhan and Karamjit Anmol joining the cast. The principal photography of the film started in November 2022 and was wrapped in January 2023. The trailer of the film was released on 21 September 2023. The film cast sought blessings at the Kartarpur Sahib. The cast also promoted the film on Bigg Boss 17.

== Reception ==
Sheetal of The Tribune rated the film 0.5/5 stars. Jaspreet Nijher of The Times of India awarded the film 4/5 stars. Sukhpreet Kahlon of The Indian Express gave the film 4/5 stars.
