= Ranjha Refugee =

- Theatrical release poster
- Directed by: Avtar Singh
- Written by: Aman Sidhu
- Screenplay by: Avtar Singh
- Story by: Avtar Singh
- Produced by: Tarsem Kaushal; Sudesh Thakur
- Starring: Roshan Prince; Karamjit Anmol; Saanvi Dhiman; Harby Sangha; Nisha Bano
- Cinematography: Navneet Behoar
- Edited by: Ajay Sharma
- Production company: J.B. Movie Production
- Distributed by: Omjee Group
- Release date: 26 October 2018 (India)
- Country: India
- Language: Punjabi

Ranjha Refugee is an Indian-Punjabi film directed by Avtar Singh. The film stars Roshan Prince, Saanvi Dhiman, Karamjit Anmol, Harby Sangha and Nisha Bano in lead roles. The film was released on 26 October 2018.

== Cast ==
- Roshan Prince
- Saanvi Dhiman
- Karamjit Anmol
- Harby Sangha
- Nisha Bano
- Aman Sidhu
