= Maa (2022 film) =

2022 Indian film

- Directed by: Baljit Singh Deo
- Written by: Rana Ranbir
- Produced by: Gippy Grewal; Ravneet Kaur Grewal
- Starring: Gippy Grewal; Gurpreet Ghuggi; Divya Dutta; Babbal Rai
- Cinematography: Baljit Singh Deo
- Edited by: Rohit Dhiman
- Music by: Salil Amrute
- Release date: 6 May 2022
- Running time: 140 minutes
- Country: India
- Language: Punjabi

Maa is a 2022 Indian Punjabi language film directed by Baljit Singh Deo and produced by Ravneet kaur Grewal and Gippy Grewal. The film stars Divya Dutta, Gippy Grewal, Babbal Rai, Raghveer Boli, Rana Ranbir and Gurpreet Ghuggi. The film was released on 6 May 2022.

== Synopsis ==
The film recounts the story of a lady who has been through many ups and downs throughout her life but she is a fearless protector who wishes to provide the best life for her child.

== Cast ==
- Divya Dutta as Manjit Kaur
- Gippy Grewal as Jora
- Babbal Rai as Taqdeer
- Gurpreet Ghuggi as Pragat Singh
- Ashish Duggal as Jagar
- Parkash Gadhu as
- Rana Ranbir as
- Nirmal Rishi as

== Soundtrack ==
Maa

Soundtrack album by Salil Amrute
- Released: 2022
- Recorded: 2022
- Genre: Feature film soundtrack
- Length: 13:24
- Language: Punjabi

Official audio
- Maa – Full Album on YouTube

Track listing
No.	Title	Singer(s)	Length
1.	"Rabb Da Roop"	Harbhajan Mann	2:08
2.	"Har Janam"	Kamal Khan	3:28
3.	"Muqamal Jindagi"	Feroz khan	2:13
4.	"Hass ke Katla"	Karmjit Anmol	2:33
5.	"Rabb ki Chahuna"	Ricky Khan	3:02
Total length:			13:24

== Critical response ==
Maa received positive reviews from critics. The Tribune rated the film 3 out of 5 stars and termed the film a "She is not an iron lady, but a mountain of iron’, as the conspirators in the movie call her, Divya has aced every emotion related to motherhood. Kudos to the dialogue-writer for giving convincing and bold lines, which are apt for a single mother bringing up two children". Sukhpreet Kahlon of "Cinestaan.com" rated the film 3 out of 5 stars and wrote "Maa urges us to take the time to thank our parents and tell them we love them. An important message indeed". Neha Vashist of The Times of India rated the film 4 out of 5 stars and wrote "Apart from the love ballad, every song of the movie was well placed and had the power to move the audience. In a nutshell, if you plan to see this movie, make sure to carry your tissues".
