= Khushboo Grewal =

Indian actress and singer

- Born: Chandigarh, India
- Occupations: Actress, Singer, VJ
- Years active: 2007–present

Khushboo Grewal also known as Khushboo Kochhar is an Indian playback singer and actress. She began her career as a VJ on B4U and then moved to Punjabi and Hindi films as an actress. She has acted in movies such as Raaz: The Mystery Continues and Punjabi films such as Carry on Jatta. She is mostly known as a playback singer, was recognised for the Meet Bros composition "Pink Lips" from the Bollywood movie Hate Story 2 She is also a lead vocalist of the Meet Bros band.

== Early and personal life ==
Grewal, hailing from a family of doctors, graduated from MCM DAV College for Women, Chandigarh. She married entrepreneur Bipin Grewal in 2006. Together they have a daughter Shanaya.

== Career ==
Grewal began her career in the entertainment industry as a VJ and then moved on to films (Punjabi and Hindi) As a VJ, she interviewed well known Bollywood celebrities. Grewal has also acted in Punjabi films such as Munde U.K. De, Carry On Jatta and Bhaji in Problem. She has also acted in TV serials such as Dil Dosti Dance, Rang Badalti Odhani, Chajje Chajje Ka Pyaar.

Grewal started her singing career with the title track of the 2013 Akshay Kumar starrer Boss as a backing vocalist and gained fame with the Hate Story 2 song "Pink Lips". Some of her other songs are "Selfiyaan" (Sharafat Gayi Tel Lene), "Lak Tunu Tunu" (Double Di Trouble), "Tu Takke" (Dharam Sankat Mein) and "Awesome Mora Mahiya" (Calendar Girls).

== Television ==
- Comedy Circus Ke Mahabali as Khushboo
- Dil Dosti Dance as Khushboo Meerchandani
- Rang Badalti Odhani as Khushboo Khandelwal
- Chhajje Chhajje Ka Pyaar as Lipika Mahajan
- Ramleela – Ajay Devgn Ke Saath– Life OK
- Ishaan: Sapno Ko Awaaz De– Disney
- VJ for B4U Movies channel from 2002 to 2008
- Barrister Roy as Varsha – DD National (2006)
- Presenter for Just TV Punjabi channel

== Filmography ==
- Aa Gaye Munde U.K. De (Punjabi) as Lovely
- Bhaji in Problem (Punjabi) as Jasmeet
- Carry On Jatta (Punjabi) as Preet
- Munde U.K. De (Punjabi) as Candy
- Raaz: The Mystery Continues as Karen
- Paisa Yaar n Panga as Waniya

== As a playback singer ==
| Year | Film or Music Album | Song | Co-singer(s) | Record Label |
|---|---|---|---|---|
| 2013 | Boss | "Boss" | Meet Bros, Sonu Kakkar | |
| 2014 | Aa Gaye Munde U.K. De | "Title Track" | Nishawan Bhullar | |
| 2014 | Hate Story 2 | "Pink Lips" | Meet Bros | T-Series |
| 2014 | Sharafat Gayi Tel Lene | "Selfiyaan" | Meet Bros | |
| 2014 | Double Di Trouble | "Lak Tunu Tunu" | Gippy Grewal | |
| 2015 | Dharam Sankat Mein | "Tu Takke" | Gippy Grewal | |
| 2015 | Calendar Girls | "Awesome Mora Mahiya" | Meet Bros | |
| 2015 | Calendar Girls | "We Will Rock The World" | Neha Kakkar | |
| 2016 | Baaghi | "Girl I Need You" | Arijit Singh, Roach Killa | |
| 2016 | Junooniyat | "Pagalon Sa Naach" | Meet Bros | |
| 2018 | Love Me (Bollywood Version) | "Love Me (Bollywood Version)" | Meet Bros | |
| 2018 | Welcome to New York | "Meher Hai Rab Di" | Mika Singh | |
| 2019 | Dream Girl | "Gat Gat" | Jass Zaildar | |
| 2020 | Charche | Charche | Ishq | Koinage Records |

== Awards ==
- 2013: Nominated for the Best Supporting Actress Award at the PTC Punjabi Film Awards
