= Navtej =

Navtej is an Indian masculine given name. Notable people with the given name include:

- Navtej Bharati (born 1938), Punjabi Canadian poet
- Navtej Singh Cheema, Indian politician
- Navtej Hundal (1933–2019), Indian actor
- Navtej Johar (born 1959), Indian choreographer
- Navtej Singh Rehal, Indian–Danish singer
- Navtej Sarna (born 1957), Indian author, columnist and diplomat
