= Babbal Rai =

Indian Punjabi singer, songwriter and actor

- Born: Simranjeet Singh Rai; Samrala, Punjab, India
- Occupations: Singer, songwriter
- Years active: 2008–present

Babbal Rai is an Indian Punjabi singer, songwriter and film actor.

== Music career ==
Rai made his career debut with the album Sau Putt: The First Chapter, which brought him into the limelight in the music industry. The album, which was brought by the label Point Zero in March 2010, however was not a huge hit as Rai was unable to come to India and promote the album. Meanwhile, he worked and collected money for making music and videos. In 2012, he released the single "Sohni". It is reported that Rai feels that his claim to fame is to sing what he feels from his heart.

In 2014, Babbal released his second album, Girlfriend, under the label Speed Records.

== Film career ==
Rai began his film career with a special guest appearance in the Punjabi film Singh vs Kaur in 2013, starring Gippy Grewal and Surveen Chawla. In 2014, he featured in his debut film Mr & Mrs 420, along with Jassi Gill, Yuvraj Hans, Binnu Dhillon and Jaswinder Bhalla, and appeared in a dual-role cameo, a first in Punjabi film industry.

== Filmography ==
Year	Title	Role	Co-starring
2013	Singh vs Kaur	–	Gippy Grewal, Surveen Chawla, Binnu Dhillon, Japji Khaira, B.N. Sharma, Diljit Kaur, Rana Jung Bahadur, Avtar Gill, Sardar Sohi, Karamjit Anmol, Jelly, Rohit Khurana
2014	Mr & Mrs 420	Pinki/Babbu	Yuvraj Hans, Binnu Dhillon, Jassi Gill, Jaswinder Bhalla
2015	Dildariyaan	Sumair	Jassi Gill, Sagrika Ghatke, Binnu Dhillon
