= Naukar Vahuti Da =

2019 Punjabi comedy-drama film directed by Smeep Kang

- Theatrical release poster
- Directed by: Smeep Kang
- Written by: Vaibhav; Sherya
- Produced by: Rohit Kumar; Sanjeev Kumar; Ruchi Trehan; Ashu Munish Sahani
- Starring: Binnu Dhillon; Jaswinder Bhalla; Kulraj Randhawa; Gurpreet Ghuggi; Preet Anand; Upasna Singh
- Cinematography: Demel Xavier Edwards
- Music by: Gurmeet Singh
- Production company: Rangrezaa Films
- Distributed by: Omjee Group
- Release date: 23 August 2019
- Running time: 120 minutes
- Country: India
- Language: Punjabi

Naukar Vahuti Da is a 2019 Indian-Punjabi language dramedy film directed by Smeep Kang, starring Binnu Dhillon and Kulraj Randhawa. It has Jaswinder Bhalla, Gurpreet Ghuggi, Preet Anand and Upasna Singh in supporting roles, with Dhillon playing double role. The film was theatrically released on 23 August 2019.

== Cast ==
- Binnu Dhillon as Shivinder / Satnam Singh
- Kulraj Randhawa as Neetu
- Jaswinder Bhalla as Professor Bhullar
- Upasana Singh as Simran Sidhu
- Gurpreet Ghuggi as Goldie
- Preet Anand as Palak
- Smeep Kang as Producer
- Japji Khaira as Pinky

== Production ==
The film was announced in November 2018 with the cast of Binnu Dhillon, Jaswinder Bhalla, Kulraj Randhawa, Gurpreet Ghuggi, Preet Anand and Upasana Singh. The director of the film Smeep Kang along with Sanjiv Kumar, Rohit Kumar, Ruchi Trehan and Ashu Munish Sahni bankrolled the film.

== Soundtrack ==
Naukar Vahuti Da

Soundtrack album by Gurmeet Singh
- Released: August 22, 2019
- Recorded: 2019
- Genre: Feature film soundtrack
- Length: 13:38
- Language: Punjabi
- Label: T-Series
External audio
- Audio Jukebox on YouTube

The soundtrack is composed by Gurmeet Singh and lyrics by Happy Raikoti and Kaptaan.

Track listing
No.	Title	Lyrics	Singer(s)	Length
1.	"Ankhiyaan"	Happy Raikoti	Money Sondh, Priyanka Negi	2:39
2.	"Ikk Mauka"	Happy Raikoti	Kamaal Khan	2:21
3.	"Naukar Vahuti Da"	Happy Raikoti	Gippy Grewal	2:26
4.	"Dil Mangya"	Happy Raikoti	Navraj Hans, Mannat Noor	2:51
5.	"Mantar Maar Gayi"	Kaptaan	Ranjit Bawa, Mannat Noor	3:21
Total length:				13:38

== Release ==
The official trailer of the film was released by T-Series on 3 August 2019. It garnered 5.3 million views since its release on YouTube. The film was theatrically released on 23 August 2019.

=== Home media Release ===
The movie was also streamed on the Ott platform Chaupal for the digital audiences.
