= Honeymoon (2022 film) =

2022 Indian Punjabi-language film

- Theatrical release poster
- Directed by: Amar Preet Chhabra
- Written by: Naresh Kathooria (dialogue)
- Screenplay by: Naresh Kathooria
- Produced by: Bhushan Kumar; Krishan Kumar; Harman Baweja; Vicky Bahri
- Starring: Gippy Grewal; Jasmin Bhasin; Karamjit Anmol; Nasir Chinyoti; Naresh Kathooria
- Cinematography: Attar Singh Saini
- Edited by: Mukesh Thakur
- Music by: B Praak
- Production companies: Baweja Studios; T-Series Films
- Distributed by: AA Films
- Release date: 25 October 2022
- Running time: 134 minutes
- Country: India
- Language: Punjabi

Honeymoon is a 2022 Indian Punjabi-language, comedy-drama film directed by Amar Preet Chhabra. The film is produced by Bhushan Kumar, Harman Baweja, Krishan Kumar and Vicky Bahri. The film stars Gippy Grewal, Jasmin Bhasin, Karamjit Anmol, Nasir Chinyoti and Naresh Kathooria in leading roles with Nirmal Rishi, Harby Sangha, Ashok Tangri in supporting roles.

== Premise ==
The film begins by talking about the stupidity within generations of one family. A bomb lands in an Indian farm and that is when the person who owns the farm claims the bomb and runs. He pulls the pin and is blown up. Following this, his family argue he should be recognised as a Shaheed. [It is not mentioned again - done for light humour effect]. The next generation is shown to be stupid as they try to fix a fan for several days, when in reality it is because they have not paid the electricity bill. Deep (Gippy Grewal) has his hero entrance by running after and catching the bus with his chacha on. It takes them to the station to pay the electricity bill, where Deep is laughed at by Sukh when he says he does not know about online payments. Sukh (Jasmin Bhasin) giggles away hysterically and then walks with her friend to the bus stop. Deep follows her all the way home. He takes his chacha who pretends to be the guy to fix their electric meter. Deep follows Sukh up stairs to declare his love but his chacha blows the fuse. Deep returns again with his brother-in-law and again he blows the fuse, but Deep manages to declare his love to Sukh. They fall in love and are married.

A government official comes to tell the family that the government are purchasing their land for 30 crores to build an airport. The family say this is down to Sukh and her good luck. After being asked what she wants, Sukh says she wants to go on honeymoon but their extended family doesn't know what it means and joins them to celebrate a land deal that fetches them a mouthwatering price.

== Cast ==
- Gippy Grewal as Deep
- Jasmin Bhasin as Sukh
- Nasir Chinyoti as Billa
- Karamjit Anmol as Deep's Chacha
- Naresh Kathooria as Jaswant "Jassa"
- Nirmal Rishi as Deep's Elder Bhua
- Harby Sangha as Geja/Deep's Jija
- Sardar Sohi as Deep's Father
- Seema Kaushal as Deep's Mother
- Ashok Tangri as Deep's Chhota Fuffad
- Raman Mittal as Patwari
- Jenna Kerns as Air Hostess
- Jagdeep Aulakh as Cashier

== Production ==
Honeymoon was produced by Baweja Studios and T-Series. The entire film was shot in parts of London, England.

== Soundtrack ==
Honeymoon

Soundtrack album by B Praak
- Released: 28 October 2022
- Recorded: 2022
- Genre: Feature film soundtrack
- Length: 15:23
- Language: Punjabi
- Label: T-Series

B Praak chronology
Moh (2022)	Honeymoon (2022)

The music is sung by B Praak and composed with lyrics are written by Jaani.

Tracklist
No.	Title	Singer(s)	Length
1.	"Jhaanjar"	B Praak	3:56
2.	"Aa Chaliye"	B Praak	2:51
3.	"Hypnotize"	Gippy Grewal, Shipra Goyal	2:38
4.	"Honeymoon (Title Track)"	Gippy Grewal, Simar Kaur	2:14
5.	"Naa Mai Bewafa"	Tanvir Hussain	3:48
Total length:			15:23

== Reception ==
Tribune India gave the film 2 out of 5, writing, "For a one time watch, this film will make you smile and shatter some stereotypes."
