= Posti (2022 film) =

Punjabi-language film by Gippy Grewal

- Theatrical release poster
- Directed by: Rana Ranbir
- Written by: Rana Ranbir
- Produced by: Gippy Grewal; Ravneet Kaur Grewal
- Starring: Babbal Rai; Prince Kanwaljit Singh; Surilie Gautam; Raghbir Boli
- Cinematography: Sukh Kamboj
- Edited by: Rohit Dhiman
- Music by: Songs: Jay K Desi Routz; Late So New Ramgarhia; Score: Salil Amrute
- Production company: Humble Motion Pictures
- Distributed by: Omjee Star Studios
- Release date: 3 June 2022
- Country: India
- Language: Punjabi

Posti is a 2022 Indian Punjabi-language film directed by Rana Ranbir and produced by Gippy Grewal. It stars Babbal Rai, Prince Kanwaljit Singh, Surilie Gautam and Raghbir Boli. Initially scheduled to be released on 20 March 2020, the release was postponed due to the COVID-19 pandemic in India. The film was later scheduled for release on 17 June 2022.

== Cast ==
- Babbal Rai
- Prince Kanwaljit Singh as Keeda
- Surilie Gautam
- Raghveer Boli as Soni
- Zareen Khan as Heer Saleti
- Rana Ranbir
- Jass Dhillon
- Malkeet Rauni
- Rana Jung Bahadur
- Tarsem Paul
- Seema Kaushal

== Soundtrack ==
Posti

Soundtrack album by Jay K, Desi Routz and Late So New Ramgarhia
- Released: 9 March 2020
- Recorded: 2020
- Genre: Feature film soundtrack
- Language: Punjabi
- Label: Humble Music

The soundtrack is composed by Jay K, Desi Routz and Late So New Ramgarhia, lyrics are by Babbal Rai, Maninder Kailey, Pardeep Malik and Ricky Khan. The songs are sung by Jazzy B, Gippy Grewal, Babbal Rai, Rahat Fateh Ali Khan, Prabh Gill and Afsana Khan.

Track listing
No.	Title	Lyrics	Music	Singer(s)	Length
1.	"Posti (Title Track)"	Ricky Khan	Jay K	Gippy Grewal	3:41
2.	"Gabhru"	Babbal Rai	Desi Routz	Babbal Rai	3:18

== Release ==
The film was scheduled to be released on 20 March 2020, but the release was postponed due to COVID-19 pandemic. And after the pandemic the same has released on 17th June 2022 and got praise for its story telling and raising a serious issue in humorously .
