= Bhaji in Problem =

2013 film by Smeep Kang

- Theatrical release poster
- Directed by: Smeep Kang
- Produced by: Ashvini Yardi; Viacom 18 Motion Pictures
- Starring: Gippy Grewal; Gurpreet Ghuggi; Ragini Khanna; Misha Bajwa; B. N. Sharma; Rubina; Khushboo Grewal
- Music by: Jatinder Shah; Surinder Rattan
- Production company: Viacom 18 Motion Pictures
- Distributed by: Grazing Goat Pictures Pvt. Ltd; Round Square Production; White Hill Studios
- Release date: 15 November 2013
- Country: India
- Language: Punjabi
- Budget: ₹5 crores
- Box office: ₹17 crores

Bhaji in Problem is a 2013 Indian Punjabi-language comedy film directed by Smeep Kang, who had earlier directed films like Carry on Jatta and Lucky Di Unlucky Story, both of which featured Gippy Grewal in the lead role. Grewal also appears in this film, with an ensemble cast including Ragini Khanna, Gurpreet Ghuggi, B. N. Sharma, Karamjit Anmol, Japji Khaira, Khushboo Grewal and Misha Bajwa, amongst others. The film is produced by Ashvini Yardi. Bollywood actor Akshay Kumar, who also appears in the film briefly as a lookalike of himself. The film also features actor Om Puri and cricketer Harbhajan Singh. Bhaji in Problem was released on 15 November 2013 on over 600 screens worldwide.

== Synopsis ==
The movie centres around Sundeep Cheema (Gurpreet Ghuggi), a man married to two women. Both of his wives, Anu (Misha Bajwa) and Jasmeet (Khushboo Grewal), are unaware of the existence of the other and believe that Cheema has business-related reasons that he has to be away from them half of the time. While Sundeep is leading a happy life, the balance of his duality is threatened when Jeeta (Gippy Grewal) comes into his life. Jeeta falls head over heels for Preet (Ragini Khanna), a match that Sundeep is firmly against. Sundeep is aware of Jeeta's notorious past, and Jeeta is privy to Sundeep's dual existence, leading to a comedy of errors in which both sides know the deepest and the most intimate secrets of the other. This leads to a battle of wits and charm wherein two friends encounter further problems.

== Cast ==
- Gippy Grewal as Jeeta / Maninder / Gourav Jain GJ
- Ragini Khanna as Preet
- Gurpreet Ghuggi as Sandeep Cheema
- Om Puri as Balli, Jeeta's Uncle
- B.N. Sharma as Mehar Singh
- Karamjit Anmol as Maninder
- Khushboo Grewal as Jasmeet
- Misha Bajwa as Anu
- Nisha Bano as Harleen
- Kuldeep Sharma as Sandeep's father
- Seema Kaushal as Sandeep's mother
- Gurwinder Kaur as Sweety, Balli's wife
- Rana Jung Bahadur as Charan Singh
- Avtaar Gill as Jagtar Singh, Jeeta's father
- Naresh Kathooria as Charan Singh's Son 1
- Swatantra Bharat as Charan Singh's Son 2
- Japji Khaira as Roop, Charan Singh daughter (Special appearance)
- Harbhajan Singh as Inspector Harbhajan (Special appearance)
- Akshay Kumar as Bakshay (Special appearance)

== Soundtrack ==
No.	Title	Singer(s)	Length
1.	"Chad Gayi"	Gippy Grewal
2.	"Ghar Di Sharaab"	Gippy Grewal
3.	"Love Ho Gaya"	Gippy Grewal
4.	"Bhaji in Problem"	Gippy Grewal
5.	"Ferrari"	Gippy Grewal
6.	"Ishq Zehreela"	Gippy Grewal

== Awards and nominates ==
Award	Recipient(s) and nominee(s)	Category	Result
PTC Punjabi Film Award - 2014	Gurpreet Ghuggi	Best Supporting Actor	Won
PTC Punjabi Film Award - 2014	Naresh Kathooria & Gurpreet Ghuggi	Best Dialogues	Nominated
PTC Punjabi Film Award - 2014	Khushboo Grewal	Best Supporting Actress	Nominated
