= Mr & Mrs 420 Returns =

- Theatrical release poster
- Directed by: Ksshitij Chaudhary
- Written by: Naresh Kathooria
- Screenplay by: Naresh Kathooria
- Produced by: Rupaali Gupta; Deepak Gupta
- Starring: Ranjit Bawa; Jassi Gill; Karamjit Anmol; Jaswinder Bhalla; Payal Rajput; Gurpreet Ghuggi
- Edited by: Rohit Dhiman
- Music by: Gurcharan Singh
- Production company: Friday Russh Motion Pictures
- Distributed by: Omjee Group
- Release date: 15 August 2018 (India)
- Running time: 136 minutes
- Country: India
- Language: Punjabi
- Box office: ₹10 crore

Mr & Mrs 420 Returns is an Indian-Punjabi comedy film directed by Ksshitij Chaudhary starring Ranjit Bawa, Jassi Gill, Payal Rajput, Karamjit Anmol, Jaswinder Bhalla & Gurpreet Ghuggi. It is sequel to the film Mr & Mrs 420 which was released in 2014. The film was released on 15 August 2018.

Another sequel Mr & Mrs 420 Again released on 30 May 2025.

== Cast ==
- Ranjit Bawa as Laadi
- Jassi Gill as Jass
- Payal Rajput as Dr. Seerat
- Avantika Hundal
- Jaswinder Bhalla
- Karamjit Anmol
- Gurpreet Ghuggi
- Anita Devgan
- Naresh Kathooria as Goga Mastana

== Soundtrack ==
Mr & Mrs 420 Returns

Soundtrack album by Jay K
- Released: 6 August 2018
- Recorded: 2018
- Genre: Feature film soundtrack
- Language: Punjabi
- Label: Lokdhun Punjabi

Jay K chronology
Carry On Jatta 2 (2018)	Mr & Mrs 420 Returns (2018)	Mar Gaye Oye Loko (2018)

Gurcharan Singh soundtrack chronology
Ashke (2018)	Mr & Mrs 420 Returns (2018)

=== Track List ===
No.	Title	Lyrics	Music	Singer(s)	Length
1.	"Chann Wargi"	Khushi	Jay K	Ranjit Bawa	2:58
2.	"Tu Te Main"	Happy Raikoti	Jay K	Jassi Gill	3:49
3.	"Att Chili"	Kabal Saroopwali	Jay K	Ranjit Bawa	2:24
4.	"Patt Tenu"	Premjeet Dhillon	Jay K	Premjeet Dhillon	1:43
5.	"Title Track"	Vinder Nathumajra	Gurcharan Singh	Gurcharan Singh	1:31
6.	"Banjara"	Rajasthani Folk Song	Gurcharan Singh	Pushplata Patidar	2:14

== Release ==
The movie was released on the big screens on 15 August 2018. It was later available to be streamed on the Chaupal Ott Platform.

== Reception ==
The Times of India gave the film a rating of 3.5 out of 5. Reviewer Jaspreet Nijher appreciates the direction work of Ksshitij Chaudhary.

Jasmine Singh of The Tribune also rated the film as 3.5 out of 5. Reviewer appreciates the way drug issue is raised in film. Reviewer also appreciates the whole cast of the film. In last added, "The drug problem in Punjab might take some time to solve but till then the film gives an all new perspective on it, one that can be laughed about without undermining the seriousness of the issue."
