= Fer Mamla Gadbad Gadbad =

- Directed by: Rimpy Prince
- Written by: Yogesh Grover
- Produced by: PTC Punjabi & PTC Motion Pictures
- Starring: Roshan Prince; Japji Khera; Bhanu Sri Mehra; B.N. Sharma
- Narrated by: Yogesh Grover
- Music by: Jaggi Singh
- Distributed by: T-Series
- Release date: 12 July 2013
- Country: India
- Language: Punjabi

Fer Mamla Gadbad Gadbad (Punjabi: ਫੇਰ ਮਾਮਲਾ ਗੜਬੜ ਗੜਬੜ) is a Punjabi film scheduled for release. The film was to be released on 12 July 2013, starring Roshan Prince, Japji Khera and Bhanu Sri Mehra.‘FMGG’ is a romantic-comedy story revolving around an aspiring actor ‘Jassi’ (Roshan Prince) who dreams of making a movie and launch himself as a ‘hero’. So that he could get to marry his love interest ‘Roop’ (Bhanushree Mehra). To fulfill his dreams, he starts doing immoral activities and makes quick-money by creating dramas.

During one such ‘drama’, he ends up breaking the marriage of ‘Geet’ (Japji Khaira) and incidentally marries her forcefully by the village community... And now he has "two" girls in his life...

Will he end up with his love or his unexpected life partner...

== Cast ==
- Roshan Prince as Jassi
- Japji Khera as Geet
- Bhanu Sri Mehra as Roop
- B.N. Sharma as Pooja
- Shavinder Mahal as Mohan Singh (Jassi's father)
- Sunita Dhir as Jassi's mother
- Hobby Dhaliwal as Amar Singh
- Rana Jang Bahadur
- Rana Ranbir as Rambo (Jassi's friend)
- Bhotu Shah
- Karamjit Anmol as Karma
- Jarnail Singh as Tota
- Nisha bano as Karmo
- Satish Kaul as Gill Sahib (Geet's father)

== Soundtrack ==
Track	Song	Artist(s)	Composer	Writer
01	"Putt Sardaran De"	Roshan Prince	Jaggi Singh	Jaggi Singh
02	"Ullu Di Pathi"	Jaggi Singh	Jaggi Singh	Jaggi Singh
03	"Tappe"	Sudesh Kumari	Jaggi Singh	Jaggi Singh
04	"Fer Mamla Gadbad Gadbad"	Roshan Prince, Karamjit Anmol	Jaggi Singh	Jaggi Singh
05	"Kalli Nu Le Ja"	Roshan Prince, Sudesh Kumari	Jaggi Singh	Jaggi Singh
06	"Dil De Varke"	Kamal Khan	Jaggi Singh	Jaggi Singh
07	"Lakk Gadvi Varga"	Sonu Kakkar, Roshan Prince	Jaggi Singh	Jaggi Singh
08	"Rab Jaane"	Master Saleem	Jaggi Singh	Jaggi Singh
09	"Vaaja"	Roshan Prince	Jaggi Singh	Jaggi Singh

== Accolades ==
2014 PTC Punjabi Film Awards
Won

- PTC Punjabi Film Award for Best Performance In a Comic Role - B.N. Sharma
- PTC Punjabi Film Award for Best Music Director - Jaggi Singh
- PTC Punjabi Film Award for Best Playback Singer Male - Dil De Varke by Kamal Khan

Nominated

- PTC Punjabi Film Award for Best Film - PTC Motion Pictures
- PTC Punjabi Film Award for Best Actor - Roshan Prince
- PTC Punjabi Film Award for Best Actress - Japji Khaira
- PTC Punjabi Film Award for Best Supporting Actor - Rana Ranbir
- PTC Punjabi Film Award for Best Debut Female - Bhanu Sri Mehra
- PTC Punjabi Film Award for Best Popular Song of The Year - Dil De Varke by Kamal Khan
- PTC Punjabi Film Award for Best Lyricist - Dil De Varke by Jaggi Singh
- PTC Punjabi Film Award for Best Playback Singer Female - Lakk Gadvi Varga by Sonu Kakkar
- PTC Punjabi Film Award for Best Editor - Harpreet Singh
- PTC Punjabi Film Award for Best Background Score - Salil Amrute
- PTC Punjabi Film Award for Best Dialogues - Rana Ranbir & Naresh Sharma
