= Mahaul Theek Hai =

- Directed by: Jaspal Bhatti
- Written by: Jaspal Bhatti
- Produced by: Jaspal Bhatti
- Starring: Jaspal Bhatti; Raj Babbar; Daljeet Kaur; Smeep Kang; Asha Sharma; Kulbhushan Kharbanda
- Release date: 12 February 1999
- Running time: 135 minutes
- Language: Punjabi

Mahaul Theek Hai is a 1999 Indian Punjabi language comedy film directed by Jaspal Bhatti. The film is a satire of police departments of Punjab and their functioning.

== Plot ==
A boy meets a girl. Boy's brother, is involved with an illegal businessman. Girl's father is cheated of land by his brother and has become drunk. He is made to take the blame for killing a politician in return for money so that the police can close the file. While the real murderer who later arrives to take the blame so as to make his mark in crime world is portrayed as a madman to hide the mischief done.

== Cast ==
- Smeep Kang
- Jaspal Bhatti
- Raj Babbar
- Jaswinder Bhalla
- BN Sharma - Billu Bakra
- Yograj Singh - Shera Foreman
- Gopi Bhalla
- Daljeet Kaur
- Asha Sharma
- Kulbhushan Kharbanda
- Navin Nischol
- Chandni Toor
- Vivek Shauq
- Sunil Grover
- Arminder Singh

== Soundtrack ==
The soundtrack for Mahaul Theek Hai was produced by H. M. Singh and released 12 February 1999. The soundtrack of the Hindi dubbed version was released in February 2000.
