= Manje Bistre 2 =

2019 Indian-Punjabi comedy film

- Theatrical release poster
- Directed by: Baljit Singh Deo
- Screenplay by: Gippy Grewal
- Produced by: Gippy Grewal
- Starring: Gippy Grewal; Simi Chahal; Gurpreet Ghuggi; Karamjit Anmol
- Cinematography: Baljit Singh Deo
- Edited by: Rohit Dhiman; Baljit Singh Deo
- Music by: Jatinder Shah
- Production company: Humble Motion Pictures
- Distributed by: White Hill Studios
- Release date: 12 April 2019 (India)
- Running time: 125 minutes
- Country: India
- Language: Punjabi

Manje Bistre 2 is a 2019 Indian-Punjabi comedy film written by Gippy Grewal and directed by Baljit Singh Deo. It is the second installment of Manje Bistre series. Produced by Gippy Grewal under his banner Humble Motion Pictures; it stars Gippy Grewal and Simi Chahal in the lead with Gurpreet Ghuggi, Karamjit Anmol, B.N. Sharma, and Sardar Sohi in supporting roles. The film revolves around Sukhi`s journey to Canada to attend his cousin’s marriage ceremony.

== Cast ==
- Gippy Grewal as Sukhi
- Simi Chahal as Rano
- Gurpreet Ghuggi as Maama
- Karamjit Anmol as Sadhu Singh
- B.N. Sharma as Planner
- Sharik Khan
- Sardar Sohi
- Raghveer Boli as Kaleja
- Jaggi Singh as Gandaa

== Soundtrack ==
Manje Bistre 2

Soundtrack album by Jay K (Jassi Katyal), Gurmeet Singh, Soul Rockers
- Released: 3 April 2019
- Recorded: 2019
- Genre: Feature film soundtrack
- Length: 22:46
- Label: Saga Music

The music of songs have been composed by Jay K (Jassi Katyal), Gurmeet Singh and Soul Rockers. The score by Jatinder Shah. The lyrics are by Happy Raikoti and Ricky Khan.

Track listing
No.	Title	Lyrics	Music	Singer(s)	Length
1.	"Current"	Happy Raikoti	Jay K	Gippy Grewal, Sudesh Kumari	3:17
2.	"Naina"	Jeet Sandhu	Soul Rockers	Karamjit Anmol	4:26
3.	"Boliyan"	Happy Raikoti	Gurmeet Singh	Gippy Grewal; Mannat Noor	3:26
4.	"Zubaan"	Ricky Khan	Jay K	Ricky Khan	4:26
5.	"Saak"	Happy Raikoti	Jay K	Gippy Grewal; Sudesh Kumari	3:21
6.	"Title track"	Happy Raikoti	Jay K	Nachhatar Gill	3:50
Total length:					22:46

== Reception ==
According to Box Office India, Manje Bistre 2 grossed ₹1.18 crore on its opening day in India making it the 21st highest Punjabi opener in India, while it was comparably very low to prequel Manje Bistre which grossed ₹2.21 crore on its opening day. In its opening weekend the film netted ₹4.12 crore in India and ₹5 crore at overseas including $415,000 from North America.

== Sequel ==
A sequel to this film titled Manje Bistre 3 directed by Baljit Singh Deo and produced by Gippy Grewal and Ravneet Kaur Grewal is set to release on 26 July 2024.
