= Lock (film) =

- Directed by: Smeep Kang
- Written by: Pali Bhupinder Singh
- Story by: Joy Mathew
- Produced by: Sippy Grewal Ravneet Grewal; Pushpinder Happy; Paminder Singh; Muskaan Grewal
- Starring: Gippy Grewal; Gurpreet Ghuggi; Geeta Basra; Karamjit Anmol; Smeep Kang
- Cinematography: Binendra Menon
- Edited by: Tarun Chouhan
- Music by: Laddi Gill; Jassi Katyal
- Production company: Ekrehmat Productions
- Release date: 14 October 2016
- Country: India
- Language: Punjabi
- Budget: ₹ 5 cr

Lock is a 2016 Indian Punjabi-language thriller film directed by Smeep Kang, written by Pali Bhupinder Singh and starring Gippy Grewal, Gurpreet Ghuggi, Geeta Basra, Karamjit Anmol and Smeep Kang as the main protagonists of the film and was released worldwide on 14 October 2016. The film is a remake of Malayalam film Shutter.<ref]</ref>

== Plot ==
Bhola (Gippy Grewal) is a rickshaw driver that wants to start a life in Dubai. He befriends Gill (Smeep Kang) who is a NRI regularly living in Dubai recently returned to India. Bhola believes that Gill will help him leave Punjab and settle in Dubai. Gill is married and has a teenaged son and a daughter attending college. However, Gill is a strict father and asks his daughter to quit college and get married after learning she goes to mall with a male friend.

Harpal (Gurpreet Ghuggi) is a film script writer. One day when rides Bhola's rickshaw to his hotel, he leaves his bag containing his script on the rickshaw. After he realizes it, he begins to search for Bhola.Later in the night, Bhola, with Harpal's bag he found in his rickshaw, drinks with Gill and two friends. The other two leave Gill and Bhola early, leaving them drinking together. Soon they find they are out of alcohol, so they go to a shop to buy another one. On their way back to drink, they witness a street girl (Geeta Basra). Gill, a decent man who is now drunk, develops the desire to have sex with her, so they take her along.

However, all local hotels refuse to offer a room on hourly basis. Bhola comes up with the idea that they do it in Gill's shop, which is right in front of Gill's house and has a bed inside. Gill and the street girl enter the shop, and Bhola locks it from outside so that nobody can enter. He also promise that he will come back after one hour to open it. Bhola goes to a restaurant to eat, where he meets Harpal. Harpal asks Bhola to return his bag, but Bhola says the bag is with Gill and he can only get it after one hour. Harpal drinks with Bhola to kill time so that they will leave together after one hour to get his bag.

On his way back to open the lock for Gill, Bhola is caught by police for drunk driving. Harpal tries to bribe the police to save Bhola, which however makes him arrested too with Bhola. Police tell them they will not be released until morning. Bhola becomes mad after realizing there will be problem for Gill if he cannot open the shop for them on time, so he calls Gill to tell him get out of the shop by their own. However, Gill did not take his phone with him. Gill's family answers Bhola's phone and knows everything. Meanwhile in the shop, Gill did not have sex with the girl for being too shy.

Bhola goes to the shop to open the lock for Gill, but gives up the idea as he sees too many people are around. If he opens it with the presence of public, it will destroy Gill's reputation. Bhola decides to open it in the night when nobody is around. In the shop, the girl becomes angry for being stuck in the shop. She tries to make noise but Gill ties her to avoid grabbing people's attention. Later he begs the girl to keep quiet to wait for Bhola, to save his fame; she agrees. The girl also tells him that she has an unhappy arranged marriage, which is why she is doing this, making Gill guilty of planning to arrange his daughter's marriage.

Later in the night, the lock is opened and they both leave. Bhola arrives there later. To Gill's shock, it is not Bhola that opened the lock. After realizing the other key is with his family, and Bhola says he accidentally told Gill's family everything in the phone call, Gill realizes it is his family that opened the lock secretly to save his reputation. Gill, feeling guilty and shamed, returns his house. But to his surprise again, only his daughter know the whole thing and she sent her friend to open to lock. Gill feels sorry for his daughter and promises to send her back to college again.

At the end of the movie, it is revealed that the street girl is Harpal's wife.

== Cast ==
- Gippy Grewal as Bhola Auto Wala
- Gurpreet Ghuggi as Harpal
- Geeta Basra as Pammi (Harpal's Assistant)
- Karamjit Anmol as Taami Scooter Wala
- Smeep Kang as Gill Bai
- Sippy Gill as Sherry

== Track List ==
S. No.	Track	Singer	Music	Lyrics
1.	"Jatt On Top"	Gippy Grewal	Jassi Katyal	Dalvir Sarobad
2.	"Chadd Gai Oye"	Happy Raikoti	Laddi Gill	Happy Raikoti
3.	"Boliyan"	Sippy Gill	Laddi Gill	Happy Raikoti
