= Bailaras =

- Directed by: Ksshitij Chaudhary
- Screenplay by: Jass Grewal
- Produced by: Binnu Dhillon
- Starring: Binnu Dhillon; Prachi Tehlan; Dev Kharoud; Karamjit Anmol
- Edited by: Rahul Singh
- Music by: Jatinder Shah
- Production company: Naughty Men Productions
- Distributed by: White Hill Studios
- Release date: 6 October 2017 (India)
- Running time: 134 minutes
- Country: India
- Language: Punjabi

Bailaras is a 2017 Punjabi film starring Binnu Dhillon, Prachi Tehlan, Karamjit Anmol and Nirmal Rishi and directed by Ksshitij Chaudhary. The film was released to theaters on 6 October 2017.

== Plot ==
Bailaras is the story of a villager named Jagga (Dhillon) who owns a Bailaras tractor and is famous for winning tochan (tug of war between tractors) competitions in and around his village. The tractor is his prized possession and his entire life revolves around it. The only problem in his life is the constant pressure on him by his family to get married but until date he did not fall in love with any girl. Other tochan competitors are jealous of his bailaras and want to defeat him in a tochan competition by any means possible. This family drama is about a simple man's dream of finding his true love and keeping his family together, which includes his tractor bailaras. Will Jagga ever find the girl of his dreams? Will the competitors ever be able to defeat him? This family entertainer shows the struggles of a simple man to fight against the world to achieve his dreams.

== Cast ==
- Binnu Dhillon as Jagga
- Prachi Tehlan as Sonali
- Dev Kharoud as Karma
- Karamjit Anmol
- Nirmal Rishi as Jagga's Grandmother
- Ammy Virk as himself
- Hobby Dhaliwal as Jagga's uncle
- Rupinder Rupi as Jagga's aunty
