= Avantika Hundal =

Indian television actress

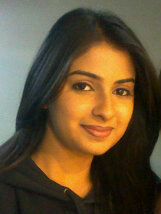
- Occupation: Actress
- Years active: 2008–present
- Father: Navtej Hundal

Avantika Hundal is an Indian Hindi television and Punjabi film actress She played the role of Mihika in the show Yeh Hai Mohabbatein. She has also worked in Man Ki Awaaz Pratigya serial aired on Star Plus as Aarushi Saxena. She is also known for the Punjabi films Mr & Mrs 420 and Mr & Mrs 420 Returns. At least after 3 years leap she come back to television, playing the role of Preesha replacing Garima Parihar in Mose Chhal Kiye Jaaye.

== Television ==
Year	Show	Role
2009–2012	Mann Kee Awaaz Pratigya	Aarushi Saxena / Aarushi Tanmay Srivastav
2016–2019	Yeh Hai Mohabbatein	Mihika Iyer / Mihika Romesh Bhalla
2022	Mose Chhal Kiye Jaaye	Preesha

== Filmography ==
Punjabi

- 2013: Burrahh as Harman
- 2014: Mr & Mrs 420 as Laadi
- 2018: Mr & Mrs 420 Returns

Hindi

- 2008: Bachna Ae Haseeno as Mona(Mahi's friend)

== Personal life ==
Hundal is the daughter of the actor Navtej Hundal.
