= Shinda Shinda No Papa =

Indian Punjabi comedy film

- Theatrical release poster
- Directed by: Amarpreet GS Chhabra
- Written by: Nikhil Mehrotra; Sharan Sharma
- Produced by: Gippy Grewal; Ravneet Kaur Grewal; Siddharth Anand Kumar
- Starring: Gippy Grewal; Hina Khan; Shinda Grewal
- Cinematography: Sukh Kamboj
- Edited by: Mukesh Thakur
- Music by: Shah An Shah; Badshah; Avvy Sra
- Release date: 10 May 2024
- Running time: 135 minutes
- Country: India
- Language: Punjabi

Shinda Shinda No Papa is a 2024 Indian-Punjabi-language comedy film directed by Amarpreet GS Chhabra. The film stars Gippy Grewal who co-produced the film as well, Hina Khan (in her Punjabi debut) and Grewal's son Shinda Grewal. It was the final film appearance of Jaswinder Bhalla before his death in 2025.

== Plot ==
Gopi, a frustrated father living in Canada, devises a plan to take his unruly son Shinda to India to discipline him.

== Cast ==
- Gippy Grewal as Gopi, Shinda's father and Nikki's husband
- Shinda Grewal as Shinda, Gopi and Nikki's son
- Hina Khan as Nikki, Shinda's mother and Gopi's wife
- Prince Kanwaljit Singh as Makhan, Gopi’s cousin and best friend, Jelly’s Son
- Jaswinder Bhalla as Police Inspector
- Nirmal Rishi as Vadi Dadi, Jagdev Singh’s mother, Gopi’s Grandmother and Shinda’s great-grandmother
- Raghveer Boli as
- Seema Kaushal
- Hardeep Gill As Jagdev Singh, Gopi’s father, Shinda’s grandfather

== Release ==
The lead actors announced the film on 28 July 2023. Earlier slated to release on the eve of Baisakhi on 14 April 2024, the release date was then pushed and released on 10 May 2024.

=== Home media ===
The film was released on Chaupal on 31 October 2024.

== Reception ==
Archika Khurana of The Times of India rated the film 3.5 stars out of 5 and wrote, "Shinda Shinda No Papa effectively portrays the dynamics of a father-son relationship against the backdrop of family life and cultural transitions. The use of a trip to India as a catalyst for exploring traditional values and parenting styles against the backdrop of life in Canada is a compelling narrative choice.".
