= Main Teri Tu Mera =

- Directed by: Ksshitij Chaudhary
- Screenplay by: Pali Bhupinder Singh
- Story by: Pali Bhupinder Singh * Jagjit Saini (Dialogues)
- Produced by: Sanghera Gurjit & Lakvir Singh Azad
- Starring: Roshan Prince; Mankirt Aulakh; Yamini Malhotra; Jazz Sodhi; Karamjit Anmol; Anita Devgan
- Cinematography: Vineet Malhotra
- Edited by: Rahul Singh
- Music by: Laddi Gill; Jaggi Singh; Millind Gaba; Jassi Katyal; Gurcharan Singh
- Production company: Yabblee Entertainment
- Distributed by: PTC Punjabi
- Release date: 19 August 2016
- Country: India
- Language: Punjabi

Main Teri Tu Mera is a 2016 Indian Punjabi-language film directed by Ksshitij Chaudhary, written by Pali Bhupinder Singh and starred Roshan Prince, Yamini Malhotra, Mankirt Aulakh, Jazz Sodhi, and Karamjit Anmol. The film was released on 19 August 2016. The movie has been majorly shot in border areas of village Ferozepur very near to Pakistan and some scenes of movie have also been shot in Chandigarh. Malhotra, Aulakh and Sodhi make their Punjabi film debut in Main Teri Tu Mera.

The story revolves around a rural boy called Amru who is a day dreamer. He starts dreaming of a girl (Jazz Sodhi) who suddenly appears in reality and tells him that they are already married.

== Cast ==
- Roshan Prince as Amarjit a.k.a. Amru
- Mankirt Aulakh as Kirat
- Jazz Sodhi as Simran
- Karamjit Anmol as Bhanti, Amarjit's friend
- Anita Devgan as Melo, Amarjit's mother
- Harinder Bhullar as Sher Singh, Amarjit's brother
- Mannat Singh as Meeto, Amarjit's sister-in-law
- Love as Babbi, Amarjit's nephew
- Gurpreet Kaur Bhangu as Magho Taayi
- Yamini Malhotra as Kammo
- Parminder Gill as Kammo's Mother
- Malkeet Rauni as Kammo's father
- Dilawar Sindhu as Kharaiti, Barber
- Nisha Bano as Gagan
- Rose J Kaur as Simran's mother

== Track list ==
| S.No | Track | Singer | Featuring | Lyrics | Music |
|---|---|---|---|---|---|
| 1. | "Naina" | Roshan Prince | Jazz Sodhi | Happy Raikoti | Laddi Gill |
| 2. | "Shaman Pay Gayian" | Shafqat Amanat Ali | Yamini Malhotra | Traditional | Gurcharan Singh |
| 3. | "Bharjaiye" | Roshan Prince & Mankirt Aulakh | Roshan Prince Mankirt Aulakh | Ball Butale Wala | Jaggi Singh |
| 4. | "Chandigarh" | Mankirt Aulakh | Yamini Malhotra | Jaggi Singh | Jaggi Singh |
| 5. | "Ik Taara" | Lakhwinder Wadali | Jazz Sodhi | Savvy Dadwal | Jaggi Singh |
| 6. | "Oh Dil" | Roshan Prince | Roshan Prince | Jaggi Singh | Jaggi Singh |
| 7. | "Main Teri Tu Mera" | Roshan Prince | Roshan Prince | Happy Raikoti | Millind Gabba |
