= Gaddi Jaandi Ae Chalaangaan Maardi =

- Official Poster
- Directed by: Smeep Kang
- Written by: Naresh Kathooria
- Produced by: Gunbir Singh Sidhu; Manmord Sidhu; Sandeep Bansal
- Starring: Ammy Virk; Binnu Dhillon; Jasmin Bajwa; Jaswinder Bhalla
- Cinematography: Ravi Kumar Sana
- Edited by: Rohit Dhiman
- Music by: NVEE; Avvy Sra; Taran; Gurmeet Singh; Desi Crew; Yxng Singh; Kevin Roy
- Production company: White Hill Studios
- Distributed by: White Hill Studios
- Release date: 28 September 2023
- Running time: 122 minutes
- Country: India
- Language: Punjabi

Gaddi Jaandi Ae Chalaangaan Maardi is a Punjabi film released on 28 September 2023. The film is directed by Smeep Kang and written by Naresh Kathooria starring Ammy Virk, Binnu Dhillon, and Jasmin Bajwa in lead roles. The supporting cast includes Jaswinder Bhalla, B. N. Sharma, Seema Kaushal, Hardeep Gill, Maahi Sharma, Mohan Kamboj, Parminder Gill and Guri Ghuman.

== Cast ==
- Ammy Virk as Harinder Singh "Happy"
- Binnu Dhillon as Barinder Singh "Bhola", Happy's brother
- Jasmin Bajwa as Pooja
- Jaswinder Bhalla as Labh Singh Heera, Happy & Bhola's father
- Maahi Sharma as Pammi, Bhola's wife
- B. N. Sharma as Happy's Fuffar
- Seema Kaushal as Happy & Bhola's mother
- Honey Mattu as Happy's friend
- Hardeep Gill as Bheem Sen, Pooja's Chacha

== Music ==
The music of the film is composed by NVEE, Avvy Sra, Taran, Gurmeet Singh, Desi Crew and Yxng Singh while the background score is composed by Kevin Roy.

| No. | Title | Lyrics | Singer(s) | Length |
|---|---|---|---|---|
| 1. | "Ni Kude" | Kaptaan | Ammy Virk | 3:18 |
| 2. | "Gaddi Jaandi Ae Chalaangaan Maardi - Title Track" | Kaptaan | Ammy Virk | 2:13 |
| 3. | "Daru De Drum" | Vinder Nathu Majra | Ammy Virk | 2:35 |
| 4. | "Chaklo Chaklo" | Desi Crew | Ammy Virk | 2:30 |
| 5. | "Kya Hi Baataan" | Happy Raikoti | Ammy Virk, Jasmeen Akhtar | 2:36 |
| 6. | "Kya Hi Baataan - Female Version" | Happy Raikoti | Asees Kaur | 2:35 |
| 7. | "Boliyaan" | Veet Baljit | Arshsuhel, Simran Bhardwaj | 4:01 |
| 8. | "Addi Ni Tikkdi" | Kaptaan | Ammy Virk, Jasmeen Akhtar | 2:39 |
| Total length: | | | | 22:29 |

== Release ==
=== Theatrical ===
The release date of the film was changed twice. First it was announced that the film will release on 28 July 2023. Later it was pushed to 20 October 2023. Finally to give way to Gippy Grewal's Maujan Hi Maujan, the film finally released on 28 September 2023.

=== Home media ===
The movie was released for the digital audiences on Chaupal OTT platform on 11 January 2024.
