= Mr & Mrs 420 =

Mr. And Mrs. 420
- Theatrical release poster
- Directed by: Ksshitij Chaudhary
- Written by: Smeep Kang
- Based on: Sailesh Dey's Bengali play Joymakali Boarding
- Produced by: Rupaali Gupta
- Starring: Yuvraj Hans; Jassi Gill; Binnu Dhillon; Sharhaan Singh; Babbal Rai; Jaswinder Bhalla; Avantika Hundal; Swati Kapoor; Shruti Sodhi
- Cinematography: Krishna Ramanan
- Edited by: Rahul Singh
- Music by: Kummar
- Production company: Friday Russh Motion Pictures
- Distributed by: Omjee Cine World
- Release date: 14 March 2014
- Running time: 144 minutes
- Country: India
- Language: Punjabi

Mr & Mrs 420 is a 2014 Punjabi comedy film directed by Ksshitij Chaudhary and starring Yuvraj Hans, Jassi Gill, Babbal Rai, Binnu Dhillon and Jaswinder Bhalla in lead roles. It was released worldwide on 14 March 2014. A sequel titled Mr & Mrs 420 Returns was released on 15 August 2018. It is a remake of the 1955 Bengali film Joy Maa Kali Boarding.

== Plot ==
Deputy wants to be an actor like Dharmendra but has to settle for playing Surpanakha (character) in a local Ramlila because of the lack of opportunity. His friend Jass is unemployed and in love with a young woman who will only marry if he finds a job. Their families feel humiliated because of them. They join their friend Palli in a town for a better future and to prove themselves.

The big problem is that this cannot be done until they have a place to stay. Then comes Babbu, friend of Palli, to their rescue. It does not last long because of their partying one night. They have to look for another shelter. According to their budget, they are getting places that will only allow married couples to stay. So they lie about their marital status — somehow Palli and Jass convince Babu and Deputy to play their wives to get a roof over their heads.

== Cast ==
- Binnu Dhillon as Deputy / Neeru Paali Chhada / Japji
- Yuvraj Hans as Paali Chhada
- Jassi Gill as Jass Chhada
- Babbal Rai as Babbu Kirtpuria / Pinky Jass Chhada
- Jaswinder Bhalla as Subedaar Kirpaal Singh Gill
- Avantika Hundal as Laadi
- Swati Kapoor as Raano (Pali's Love interest)
- Shruti Sodhi as Jasmeet Gill (Subedaar'niece)

== Soundtrack ==
No.	Title	Singer(s)	Length
1.	"Naina Nu"	Jassi Gill
2.	"Glassi"	Jassi Gill
3.	"Tere Layi"	Yuvraj Hans
4.	"8 O'Clock"	Babbal Rai
5.	"Haathhan Vich"	Feroz Khan
6.	"Haathhan Vich"	Shilpa Goyal
7.	"Karla La Karna"	Yuvraj Hans	3:47

== Release ==
The movie was released on 14 march 2014. It is also available for the digital audience on the OTT platform Chaupal.
