= Uda Aida =

- Theatrical release poster
- Directed by: Ksshitij Chaudhary
- Written by: Naresh Kathooria
- Produced by: Rrupaali Gupta; Deepak Gupta; Ksshitij Chaudhary; Naresh Kathooria
- Starring: Tarsem Jassar; Neeru Bajwa; B.N. Sharma
- Cinematography: Ajayan Vincent
- Edited by: Tarun Chauhan
- Music by: R Guru; Gurcharan Singh
- Production companies: Friday Russh Motion Pictures; Ksshitij Chaudhary Films; Naresh Kathooria Films
- Distributed by: Omjee Group
- Release date: 1 February 2019 (India)
- Running time: 136 minutes
- Country: India
- Language: Punjabi
- Box office: ₹13 crore (See below)

Uda Aida is a 2019 Indian-Punjabi Drama-comedy film written by Naresh Kathooria and directed by Ksshitij Chaudhary. Co-produced by Friday Russh Motion Pictures, Ksshitij Chaudhary Films, Naresh Kathooria Films, it stars Tarsem Jassar, and Neeru Bajwa in lead roles with B.N. Sharma, Gurpreet Ghuggi and Karamjit Anmol in supporting roles. In the film, a poor and uneducated family from a village has to cope with rich city kids and their parents when their son is enrolled into a prestigious school.

The film was released theatrically on 1 February 2019. The film opened to positive response from critics and audience. The entire cast of the film got appreciation.

== Cast ==
- Tarsem Jassar as Gurnam
- Neeru Bajwa as Manjeet
- Poppy Jabbal as Myra
- Ansh Tejpal as Aman
- Karamjit Anmol as Iqbal ‘Reetha’
- Gurpreet Ghuggi aa Fouji Kartar Singh
- B. N. Sharma as Jagtar Singh
- Rose J. Kaur as Principal
- Jaspal Singh Sandhu as Vice-Principal

== Marketing and release ==
The official trailer of the film was released on 3 January on YouTube, which has been viewed 7.3 million times since its release.

The film was released theatrically on 1 February 2019. The audience can stream the movie on the Chaupal Ott platform.

== Reception ==
=== Box office ===
The film has grossed ₹4.17 crore in Canada, ₹37 lacs in Australia, ₹54 lacs in United States, ₹66 lacs in Australia, and ₹21 lacs in New Zealand.

=== Critical reception ===
Gurnaaz Kaur of The Tribune gave 3 stars out if 5 to the film. She praised the performances of Tarsem Jassar and Neeru Bajwa, and the supporting cast including Gurpreet Ghuggi, B.N. Sharma, and Karamjit Anmol.
