= Navtej Hundal =

Indian film and television actor (1933–2019)

- Born: 1933
- Died: 8 April 2019 (aged 86)
- Education: National School of Drama
- Occupation: Actor
- Spouse: Neelam Hundal
- Children: 2, including Avantika Hundal

Navtej Hundal (1933 – 8 April 2019) was an Indian film and television actor.

== Biography ==
Hundal was born in 1933. He has worked in Hindi and Punjabi films and television series. He graduated from National School of Drama. His daughter Avantika Hundal is a television and film actress. He played the role of home minister in Uri: The Surgical Strike. It was his last film. He also acted in films like Khalnayak and Tere Mere Sapne.

Besides acting in films Hundal acted in television too. He used to take acting classes.

Hundal was married to Neelam Hundal, with whom he had two daughters, Avanika, an actress and Faaya.

Hundal died on 8 April 2019 at the age of 86.

== Selected filmography ==
=== Film ===
- Angaaray (1986)
- Tera Karam Mera Dharam (1987)
- Hathyar (1989)
- Doosra Kanoon (1989)
- Diva Bale Sari Raat (1991)
- Aasmaan Se Gira (1992)
- Yalgaar (1992)
- Kshatriya (1993)
- Khalnayak (1993)
- Himalaya Ke Aanchal Mein (1995)
- Tere Mere Sapne (1996)
- Mein Zulm Ko Mitta Dungi (2001)
- Galtiyaan - The Mistake (2006)
- The Whisperers (2009)
- Uri: The Surgical Strike (2019)

=== Television ===
- Bharat Ek Khoj
- Tehkikaat
- Mahabharat
