= Naughty Jatts =

2013 film by Pankaj Batra

- Directed by: Pankaj Batra
- Story by: Naresh Kathooria
- Produced by: Satish Katyal; Sandeep Bhalla
- Starring: Neeru Bajwa; Binnu Dhillon; Aarya Babbar; Roshan Prince; B.N. Sharma; Karamjit Anmol
- Cinematography: Vineet Malhotra
- Edited by: Parveen Kathikuloth
- Music by: Sham Balkar; Gagan Deep; Vikram Khajuria; Anil Sagar; Jaggi Singh
- Production company: Multiline Entertainment
- Distributed by: OMJEE
- Release date: 2 August 2013
- Running time: 122 minutes
- Country: India
- Language: Punjabi
- Budget: 62.5 million

Naughty Jatts (Punjabi: ਨੌਟੀ ਜੱਟਸ) is a Punjabi romantic comedy film directed by Pankaj Batra and produced by Multiline Entertainment (Satish Katyal and Sandeep Bhalla). The film stars Aarya Babbar, Roshan Prince and Binnu Dhillon opposite Neeru Bajwa. It was released to theaters on 2 August 2013.

Satish Katyal has recently launched its own music company by the name FH Musics.

== Cast ==
- Neeru Bajwa as Simi Khehra
- Binnu Dhillon as Laali
- Arya Babbar as Rocky Deol
- Roshan Prince as Balwinder Deol / Beedi
- B. N. Sharma as Simi's Father
- Karamjit Anmol as Jeeta
- Kanwalpreet Singh
- Harby Sangha as Blind Beggar

== Soundtrack ==
Naughty Jatts

Soundtrack album by Jaggi Singh, G-Deep, Sham-Balkar, Vikram Khajuria, Anil Sagar
- Released: 26 June 2013
- Genre: Feature film soundtrack
- Length: 46:49
- Language: Punjabi
- Label: Times Music
External audio
- Audio Jukebox on YouTube

The soundtrack of Naughty Jatts consists of 11 songs composed by G-Deep, Anil Sagar, Sham Balkar and Jaggi Singh.

Tracklist
No.	Title	Lyrics	Music	Singer(s)	Length
1.	"Naughty Jatts" (Club Mix)	G-Deep	G-Deep	G-Deep	03:06
2.	"Naughty Jatts"	G-Deep	G-Deep	G-Deep	03:18
3.	"Ratti Teri"	Anil Sagar	Anil Sagar	Roshan Prince	02:21
4.	"Sun Sajna Saada Ishq Hai Aisa"	G-Deep		G-Deep	04:00
5.	"Tang Sajan Di"	Devshi Khanduri	Vikram Khajuria	Harshdeep Kaur	06:52
6.	"Sare Taan Gehne"			Jaspinder Narula	05:02
7.	"O Haseena – Lagdi Katrina" (Remix Version)		G-Deep	G-Deep	03:38
8.	"O Haseena – Lagdi Katrina"		G-Deep	G-Deep	03:40
9.	"Surkh Gulabi Buliya"	Kaka Purian		Roshan Prince, Penny Garewal	04:21
10.	"Nakhre Vikhayi Jaani Ain"	Kaka Purian		Roshan Prince	03:36
11.	"Hun Nahi Jeena"	Devshi Khanduri	Vikram Khajuria	Rahat Fateh Ali Khan	06:55
Total length:					46:49
