= Carry On Jatta =

2012 Indian film by Smeep Kang

- Directed by: Smeep Kang
- Written by: Naresh Kathooria
- Screenplay by: Smeep Kang; Naresh Kathooria; Zahid khursheed
- Story by: Smeep Kang; Naresh; Zahid khursheed
- Produced by: Sippy Grewal; Pushpinder Happy; Semi Dhaliwal; Sukha Singh; Nitin Talwar
- Starring: Gippy Grewal; Mahie Gill; Binnu Dhillon; Gurpreet Ghuggi; Jaswinder Bhalla; Rana Ranbir
- Cinematography: Binendra Menon
- Edited by: Bunty Nagi
- Music by: Jatinder Shah
- Production companies: Gurfateh Films; Sippy Grewal Production
- Distributed by: White Hill Studios, Sukha Production (Australia)
- Release date: 27 July 2012
- Running time: 143 minutes
- Country: India
- Language: Punjabi
- Box office: est.₹18 crore

Carry On Jatta is a 2012 Indian Punjabi comedy film directed by Smeep Kang and starring Gippy Grewal, and Mahie Gill. The film was released on 27 July 2012. This film was remade in Odia in 2015 as Pilata Bigidigala, in Telugu in 2016 as Eedo Rakam Aado Rakam, in Bangladesh (Bengali) in 2017 as Dhat Teri Ki and in Bengali (India) in 2019 as Jamai Badal.

== Plot ==
Jass (Gippy Grewal) falls in love with Mahie (Mahie Gill) at a friend's wedding. She tells her friends that she is going to marry someone who does not have a family, like herself. Mahi does not want to deal with the nagging, and interference of in-laws after marriage. So, to woo her, Jass with the help of his friend Honey (Gurpreet Ghuggi) pretends that he is an orphan. She falls in love with him, but when she tells her brother, Taji (Karamjit Anmol) he forces them to get married right away. So, Jass marries Mahie without telling his father Advocate Dhillon (Jaswinder Bhalla), brother Goldy Dhillon (Binnu Dhillon), or his wife Diljit Dhillon (Anshu Sawhney). Now, after marriage, Jass tells Mahie to find them a place to stay, and she finds a sublease room in Jass's own home, and this is where the comedy of errors begins. Jass and his best friend Honey (Gurpreet Ghuggi) cook up several plans to confuse Jass's family so Jass can live with his wife Mahie in his own home without his family ever finding out. But in between all this, Honey marries his girlfriend Preet (Khushboo Grewal) in secret because his dad Inspector Sikander Tiwana (B.N. Sharma) won't agree to his marriage, but Honey tricks Preet's parents and Preet into believing that he is Advocate Dhillon's son. This leads to a big-time fiasco. Everything unravels at the end and Mahi accepts Jass for who he is.

== Cast ==
- Gippy Grewal as Jass Dhillon
- Mahie Gill as Mahie
- Gurpreet Ghuggi as Honey Tiwana
- Binnu Dhillon as Goldy Dhillon
- Anshu Sawhney as Daljeet Dhillon
- Jaswinder Bhalla as Advocate Dhillon
- Khushboo Grewal as Preet Bhullar
- Sardar Sohi as Vada Bhullar
- B.N. Sharma as Sikander Singh Tiwana
- Rana Ranbir as Chota Bhullar/Aarhu
- Karamjit Anmol as Taji
- Inderjit Nikku [cameo]
- Naresh Kathooria as the advisor to a parliament candidate.
- Lakki Harkhowalia as Veer
- Harby Sangha
- Azzy Bagria as Lucky

== Production ==
The entire shoot of the film took place in Jalandhar, Punjab.

== Box office ==
Carry On Jatta had the second-highest opening for a Punjabi film in Punjab with ₹61 lakh net on its opening day. It then went on to have a weekend collection of ₹ 2.05 crore, an opening week collection ₹3.75 crore and is on its way to make a total of ₹10 crore in India, making it the second-highest grossing Punjabi film in India.

== Soundtrack ==
Carry On Jatta

Soundtrack album by Jatinder Shah
- Genre: Feature film soundtrack
- Language: Punjabi
- Label: Speed Records

=== Track listing ===
Track	Song	Artist(s)	Lyrics	Music
01	"Carry On Jatta"	Gippy Grewal	Kumar	Jatinder Shah
02	"Sada Hi Funda"	Gippy Grewal	Veet Baljit	Jatinder Shah
03	"Rakhi Karde Kanka Di"	Gippy Grewal-Gurlej Akthar	Veet Baljit	Jatinder Shah
04	"Mar Jawan"	Gippy Grewal	Veet Baljit	Jatinder Shah
05	"Udai Ja Udai Ja"	Gippy Grewal-Gurlej Akthar-Veet Baljit	Veet Baljit	Jatinder Shah
06	"Ni Sweety"	Gippy Grewal	Veet Baljit	Jatinder Shah
07	"Roula Pai Gaya"	Gippy Grewal - Sunidhi Chauhan	Jaggi Singh	Jatinder Shah
08	"Tera Naam"	Gippy Grewal	Veet Baljit	Jatinder Shah
09	"Mar Jawan" (Lounge Mix)	Gippy Grewal	Veet Baljit	Jatinder Shah

== Awards ==
Carry On Jatta won eight awards at the 3rd PTC Punjabi Film Awards in 2013.

Category	Winner's Name
Best Editing	Bunty Nagi
Best Performance In A Comic Role	Binnu Dhillon; Jaswinder Bhalla
Popular Star Of The Year	Gippy Grewal
Best Supporting Actor	Gurpreet Ghuggi
Best Dialogues	Naresh Kathooria
Critics Award for Best Film	Gurfateh Films, Sippy Grewal Productions, Sukha production
Critics Award for Best Director	Smeep Kang

== Sequel ==
Carry on Jatta 2 a sequel with Gippy Grewal and Sonam Bajwa in lead roles and Gurpreet Ghuggi, Binnu Dhillon, Jaswinder Bhalla, B.N. Sharma, Karamjit Anmol, Upasana Singh and Jyotii Sethi in supporting roles was released on 1 June 2018.

The third installment of the franchise, Carry On Jatta 3 was released on 29 June 2023. The film features Gippy Grewal and Sonam Bajwa in lead roles, along with returning supporting actors from the previous films.

The fourth installment of the franchise, Carry On Jatta 4 released on 26 June 2026.
