= Pehchaan 3D =

Pehchaan 3d
- Directed by: Manny Parmar
- Produced by: Manny Parmar & Gurpreet Sohi
- Music by: RDB, Panjabi Hit Squad, The Bilz & Kashif, Ranj Singh & The Discriminatiors
- Release date: 1 February 2013
- Running time: 108 minutes

Pehchaan 3D is the first Punjabi 3D movie based on a true story.

== Plot ==
"Jagjot Sidhu, a young medicine graduate, has aspirations to soon become a doctor and make his family proud. After witnessing a murder, he comes forward to testify against a corrupt family. His life, appearance, relationships, career and identity are taken away for his own protection. Life takes him on a trip filled with anger, laughter, religion, love and betrayal all centered around the man he actually is. He must get back his life and somehow get home."

== Cast ==
- Steve Dhillon as Jagjot Sidhu
- Manjit Bath as Harmesh Rai
- Karam Batth as Sunny
- Erika Virk as Neetu Sidhu
- Robin Jawanda as Manpreet Sidhu
- Gurdip Bhullar as Darshan Sidhu
- Kabir Brar as Armaan Sidhu
- Sukhwinder Takhar as Avtar Singh
- Gurnam Thandi as Mr. Gill
- Darshpreet Cambo as Inspector Kam Bajwa
- Nevin Chandra as Club DJ

== Reception ==
Ballewood.in praises Pehchaan 3D for an unusual plot, good direction and brilliant performances. The reviewer says,"Pehchaan 3D- World’s first ever 3D Punjabi feature film, stands tall above the common herd of clichéd Punjabi movies, not just because it’s a 3D movie, but also, because of its unusual storyline, brilliant acting, great direction and outstanding music." On the downside, "The lack of promotion and the fact that nobody in India knows anything about the cast of the movie, would definitely act as deterrents. Therefore, the film will require a very strong word of mouth marketing to find a foothold at the box office."

== See also ==
- List of 3D films
- List of Indian Punjabi films after 2011
