= Karamjit Anmol =

Indian comedian, singer and film producer

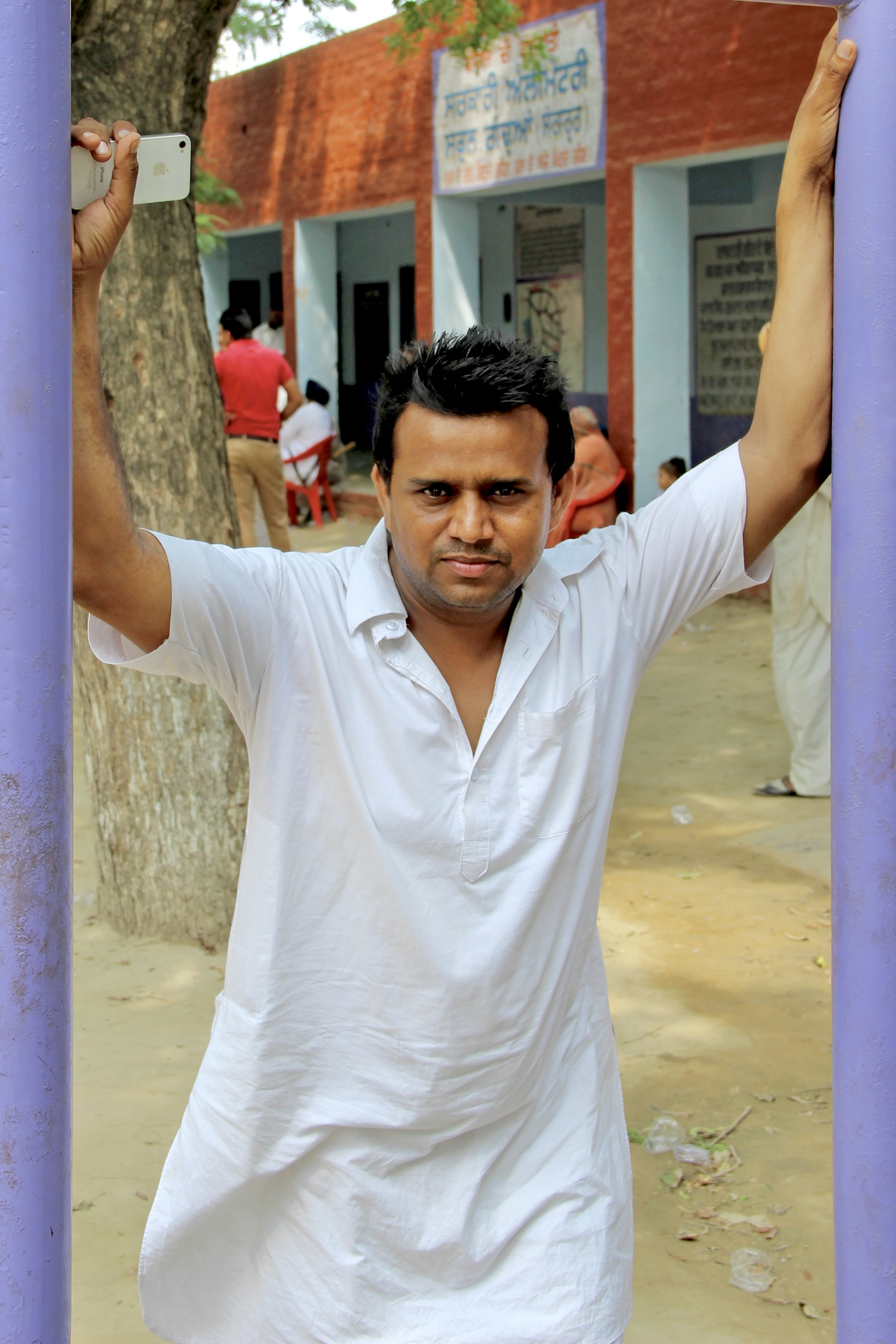
- Anmol in 2012
- Born: 2 January 1972 (age 54); Ganduan, Punjab, India
- Occupations: Actor; singer; comedian; producer
- Spouse: Gurjot Kaur
- Children: Armaan Singh Benipal, Gurshaan Singh
- Parent(s): Sadhu Singh, Murti Kaur

Karamjit Anmol is an Indian actor, comedian, singer and film producer active in the Punjabi entertainment industry. He has worked in Punjabi movies including Laavaan Phere and Carry on Jatta 2. He has also acted in the comedy plays "OMG !! Oh My God" and "Naughty Baba In Town" which were staged in Canada, America, New Zealand and Australia. He received the "PTC Best Comedian Of The Year" award in 2017 for Main Teri Tu Mera. He belongs to OBC community.

== Discography (film soundtracks) ==
Year	Movie name	Song
2006	Main Tu Assi Tussi	Title Track
2013	Singh Vs Kaur	Pandit Ji
2013	Fer Mamla Gadbad Gadbad	Title Track
2013	Jatt Boys Putt Jattan De	Yaara Ve
2014	Fateh	Tu Te Mein
2014	Goreyan Nu Daffa Karo	Mora
2015	Leather Life	Waqt
2015	Munde Kamaal De	Dil Janiya
2015	Rupinder Gandhi- The Gangster ?	Baagi
2016	Nikka Zaildar	Bhola
2017	Manje Bistre	Sadhu Halwai
2017	Nikka Zaildar 2	Title Track
2017	Sat Shri Akaal England	lakha
2018	Vadhayiyaan Ji Vadhayiyaan	Jind
2018	Mr & Mrs 420 Returns	Dil Tera
2018	Mar Gaye Oye Loko	Mithde Bol
2018	Parahuna	Ramte Ramte
2018	Afsar	Bharpoor singh patwari
2018	Atte Di Chidi	Dharti Punjab Di
2018	Ranjha Refugee	Channa Mereya
2018	Laatu	Jeth Mahina
2019	Manje Bistre 2	Naina
2019	Blackia	Koka
2019	Lukan Michi	Ghughia
2019	Muklawa	Dawayi
2019	Chandigarh Amritsar Chandigarh	Mattha

== Filmography ==
Key
†	Denotes films that have not yet been released

Year	Film	Role	Notes	Language
2007	Kaun Kise Da Beli			Punjabi
2008	Layi Lagg			Punjabi
2009	Dev D			Hindi
2010	Mitti		Guest appearance	Punjabi
2010	Chak Jawana			Punjabi
2011	West Is West		British film	English
2011	Jihne Mera Dil Luteya	Karamwala		Punjabi
2012	Jatt & Juliet	Natha Vichola		Punjabi
2012	Carry On Jatta	Tajji veer		Punjabi
2012	Sirphire	kaala		Punjabi
2013	Tu Mera 22 Main Tera 22		With Yo Yo Honey Singh	Punjabi
2013	Singh Vs Kaur	Pandit		Punjabi
2013	Daddy Cool Munde Fool	Dolu		Punjabi
2013	Lucky Di Unlucky Story	Bunty		Punjabi
2013	Jatts In Golmaal			Punjabi
2013	Fer Mamla Gadbad Gadbad			Punjabi
2013	Best of Luck	Servant Ballu		Punjabi
2013	Naughty Jatts			Punjabi
2013	Punjab Bolda			Punjabi
2013	Jatt Boys Putt Jattan de			Punjabi
2013	Jatt Airways	Mika Badmaash		Punjabi
2013	Jatt In Mood			Punjabi
2013	Bhaji in Problem	Maninder		Punjabi
2014	Ishq Brandy			Punjabi
2014	Fateh			Punjabi
2014	Disco Singh	Baai	Nominated - PTC Punjabi Film Award for Best Comic Role	Punjabi
2014	Jatt James Bond	Sucha Singh		Punjabi
2014	Double Di Trouble	Jain Saab		Punjabi
2014	Goreya Nu Daffa Karo	Kala's uncle		Punjabi
2015	Leather Life			Punjabi
2015	Oh Yaara Ainvayi Ainvayi Lut Gaya	Lawyer		Punjabi
2015	Second Hand Husband	Constable		Punjabi
2015	Munde Kamaal De			Punjabi
2015	Singh Is Bling			Hindi
2015	Dildariyaan			Punjabi
2016	Channo Kamli Yaar Di	Jailli		Punjabi
2016	Ardaas	Shambhu Nath		Punjabi
2016	Ambarsariya	Dhaba Malak		Punjabi
2016	Vaisakhi List	TBA		Punjabi
2016	Bambukat	Friend		Punjabi
2016	Main Teri Tu Mera	TBA		Punjabi
2016	Darra		Guest appearance	Punjabi
2016	Teshan			Punjabi
2016	Nikka Zaildar	Bhola		Punjabi
2016	Lock	TBA		Punjabi
2017	Sardar Saab	Laddoo		Punjabi
2017	Sargi			Punjabi
2017	Manje Bistre	Saadhu Singh (Halwai)		Punjabi
2017	Channa Mereya			Punjabi
2017	Thug Life			Punjabi
2017	Vekh Baraatan Challiyan	Resham (Bus Driver)		Punjabi
2017	Bailaras			Punjabi
2017	Dangar Doctor Jelly			Punjabi
2017	Bhalwan Singh			Punjabi
2017	Sardar Mohammad			Punjabi
2017	Sat Shri Akaal England	Lakha		Punjabi
2018	Laavaan Phere	Jija	Also producer	Punjabi
2018	Subedar Joginder Singh	Bawa Singh		Punjabi
2018	Carry on Jatta 2	Tony		Punjabi
2018	Vadhayiyaan Ji Vadhayiyaan	Honey		Punjabi
2018	Jagga Jiunda E			Punjabi
2018	Mr & Mrs 420 Returns			Punjabi
2018	Mar Gaye Oye Loko	Hakalchu	With Gippy Grewal	Punjabi
2018	Parahuna	Jija		Punjabi
2018	Afsar	Patwari	With Tarsem Jassar	Punjabi
2018	Son of Manjeet Singh			Punjabi
2018	Aate Di Chidi		With Amrit Maan	Punjabi
2018	Ranjha Refugee			Punjabi
2018	Laatu			Punjabi
2018	Yaar Beli			Punjabi
2019	Ishqaa			Punjabi
2019	Do Dooni Panj			Punjabi
2019	Kake Da Viah			Punjabi
2019	Uda Aida			Punjabi
2019	Kala Shah Kala	Hari		Punjabi
2019	Manje Bistre 2			Punjabi
2019	Lukan Michi			Punjabi
2019	Muklawa			Punjabi
2019	Munda Faridkotia			Punjabi
2019	Mindo Taseeldarni	Teja		Punjabi
2019	Baraat Bandi			Punjabi
2021	Kuriyan Jawan Baapu Preshaan			Punjabi
2021	Paani Ch Madhaani		Filming	Punjabi
2021	Shava Ni Girdhari Lal			Punjabi
2022	Bhoot Uncle Tusi Great Ho			Punjabi
2023	Yaar Mera Titliaan Warga	Semma		Punjabi
2023	Carry On Jatta 3			Punjabi
2023	Mastaney	Bashir		Punjabi

== Awards and nominations ==
Year	Film	Award Ceremony	Category	Result
2015	Disco Singh	PTC Punjabi Film Awards	Best Performance In Comic Role	Nominated
2017	Main Teri Tu Mera	PTC Punjabi Film Awards	Best Performance In Comic Role	Won

== Productions ==
Year	Film
2018	Laavaan Phere
2019	Mindo Taseeldarni
2020	No Life With Wife
Coming Soon	Laavaan Phere 2

== Music albums ==
Year	Albums
1995	Aashiq Bhaji
1996	Katt Ta Challan Dil Da
1996	Akhiyan Ch Hanju Mukk Gaye
1997	Na Hanju Mere Mukde Ne
1997	Jhaliye Tu Rona Chad De
1998	Gall Tere Mere Pyaar Di
1999	Ro Ro Naina Ne
2000	Chithian
2001	Akhada
2004	Balori Akh
2006	Churhe Wali banh
2008	Shounk
2008	Pabandi
2011	Lucky For Me
2012	Desi Rockers (2 Songs)
2014	Yaara Ve 2

=== Single and duet tracks ===
Year	Song title	Music	Label	With
2016	Pind Vikau Hai	Surjit Lovely	Karamjit Anmol	
2016	Black Suit	Nation Brothers	Shemaroo Punjabi	With Nisha Bano
2016	Dollar	Simran Goraya	Shemaroo Punjabi	With Nisha Bano
2017	Dildara	Channi Singh	Saga Hits	
2017	Inquilab Zindabaad	Mr.Wow	Karamjit Anmol	
2017	Tera Naam	Mr.Wow	Saga Music	
2017	Vekhi Jani Eh	Mr.Wow	Black Hawk Productions	With Gurbinder Maan
2017	Pani	Mr. Wow	Saga Hits	
2018	Giddha	Jaison Thind	Saga Music	With Raman Romana
2018	Mulaqat	Sukh Brar	Jass records	
