= Ksshitij Chaudhary =

Indian Punjabi film director

- Born: Amritsar, Punjab, India
- Occupation: film director
- Known for: Jatts In Golmaal, Mr & Mrs 420, Yaara o Dildaara.

Ksshitij Chaudhary is an Indian Punjabi film director known for films such as Jatts In Golmaal, Mr & Mrs 420 and Yaara o Dildaara.

== Early life and career ==
Ksshitij began his career with the direction of the DVD film Meri Vahuti Da viyah. In 2009, he got his first big break in the form of Harbhajan mann's "Heer-Ranjha" and then "Yaara o Dildaara" again a Habhajan mann's movie and then in 2013 he directed an out-and-out comedy film Jatts in Golmaal starring Arya Babbar, Gurpreet Guggi, Jaswinder Bhalla Binnu Dhillon Karamjeet Anmol. In 2014 he directed the romantic comedy film Mr. & Mrs. 420 starring Jassi Gill, Yuvraaj Hans, Babal Rai, Shruti Sodhi, Swati Kapoor, Avantika Hundal, Jaswinder Bhalla, Binnu Dhillon and with the success of his films Ksshitij Became A Successful Director of Punjabi cinema.

== Filmography ==
- Heer Ranjha: A True Love Story - 2009
- Yaara o Dildaara - 2011
- Jatts In Golmaal - 2013
- Mr & Mrs 420 - 2014
- Main Teri Tu Mera 2016
- Vekh Baraatan Challiyan - 2017
- Bailaras - 2017
- Golak Bugni Bank Te Batua - 2018
- Mr & Mrs 420 Returns - 2018
- Uda Aida - 2019
- Sohreyan Da Pind Aa Gaya - 2022
