= Yaara o Dildaara =

- Directed by: Ksshitij Chaudhary
- Produced by: Bhushan Kumar; Kishan Kumar
- Starring: Harbhajan Maan; Tulip Joshi; Kabir Bedi; Gurpreet Ghuggi; Gulzar Inder Chahal; Jonita Doda; Neena Cheema; Sunita Dheer
- Music by: Nitin Kumar Gupta; Jaidev Kumar
- Distributed by: T-Series
- Release date: 23 September 2011
- Country: India
- Language: Punjabi

Yaara o Dildaara is a 2011 Indian drama film starring Harbhajan Maan, Tulip Joshi, Kabir Bedi, Gurpreet Ghuggi, Gulzar Inder Chahal and Jonita Doda and directed by Ksshitij Chaudhary. Initially set to be released on 9 August 2011, the film was postponed and released on 23 September 2011.
