= Sippy Grewal =

Indian film producer

Sippy
- Born: Sippy Grewal; 30 August 1972 (age 54); Kum Kalan
- Occupation: Producer
- Years active: 2005-present

Sippy Grewal is an Indian film producer and distributor, best known for his work in the Punjabi film industry. He is the founder of Sippy Grewal Productions, a production company under which he has produced several successful films. Grewal is widely recognized for producing the hit film Carry On Jatta, which revolutionized Punjabi cinema and became one of the most successful films in the industry.

== Early life and personal life ==
Grewal was born in Ludhiana, Punjab, and his family hails from Koom Kalan village in Ludhiana. He completed his schooling in his village before moving to Mohali for his higher education. His younger brother Gippy Grewal is an Indian actor, singer, film director and producer whose works span over Punjabi and Hindi film industry.

== Career ==
The 2011 film Jihne Mera Dil Luteya established Grewal as a prominent figure in Punjabi cinema, with the film becoming one of the biggest hits in the history of Punjabi films at that time. In 2012, Grewal produced the film Carry On Jatta, which became a major milestone in the history of Punjabi cinema. The film achieved the highest opening and second-highest total collections for a Punjabi film at the time. Carry On Jatta is widely regarded as a game-changer for Punjabi cinema, as it took the industry to new heights and attracted a larger audience. Following Carry On Jatta, Grewal produced several successful films, including Lucky Di Unlucky Story (2013), Singh vs Kaur (2013), Best of Luck (2013), Faraar (2015), and Lock (2015). Faraar was notable for being the first Punjabi film shot in Los Angeles on a large budget. In 2016, Grewal produced Ardas, a religious drama that received widespread critical acclaim globally. His production company, Sippy Grewal Productions, has released and distributed over 50 Punjabi films worldwide, including Mel Karade Rabba, Munde UK De, Tere Naal Love Ho Gaya, Jatt & Juliet, and the record-breaking animated film Chaar Sahibzaade. Grewal is married to Kamal Preet and has two daughters.

== Filmography ==
- Dharti (2010)
- Jihne Mera Dil Luteya (2011)
- Carry on Jatta (2012)
- Mirza (2012)
- Tere Naal Love Ho Gaya (2012)
- Best Of Luck (2013)
- Lucky Di Unlucky Story (2013)
- Singh vs Kaur (2013)
- Faraar (2015)
- Lock (2015) under production
- Ardaas (film)

== Recognition ==
Best Film Critics - Carry On Jatta
