= Smeep Kang =

Indian actor, film producer and director (born 1973)

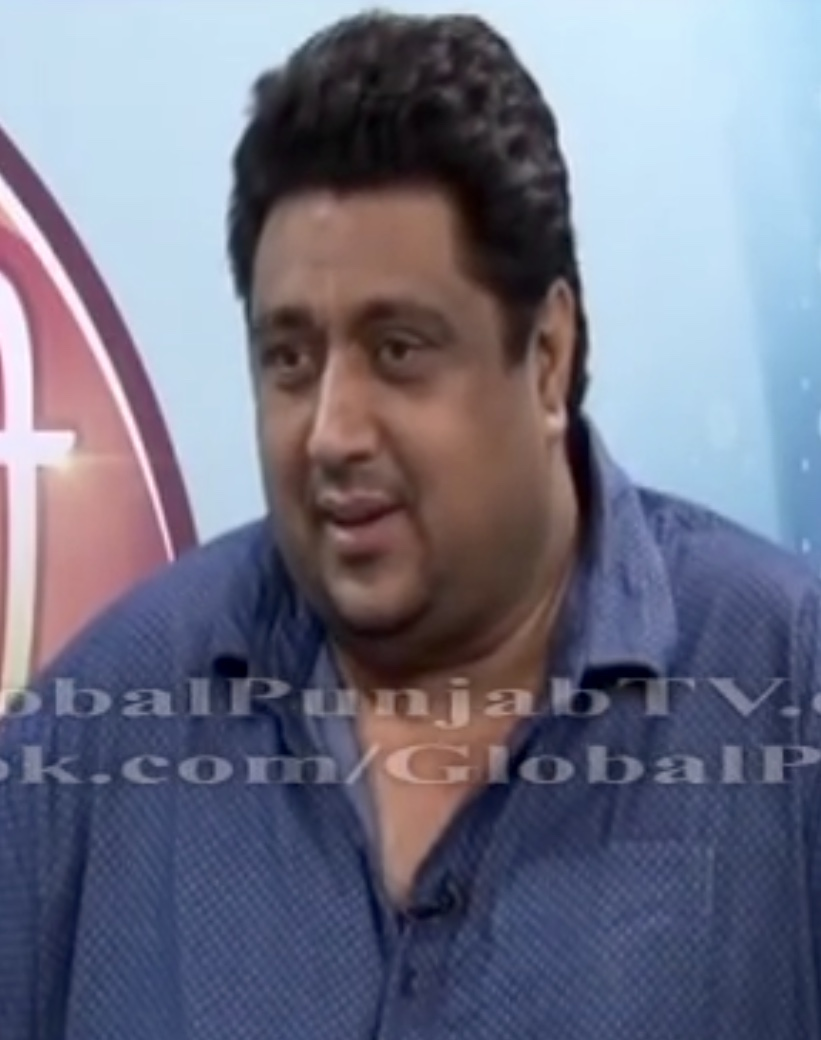
- Born: 30 January 1973 (age 53); Patiala, Punjab, India
- Occupations: Film Director; Actor; Film Producer
- Years active: 1999–present

Smeep Kang (born 30 January 1973) is an Indian film director, film producer, actor who works in the Punjabi films. He graduated from Punjab University with a degree in chemical engineering.

He is well known for directing the Punjabi comedy films Chak De Phatte (2008), Carry On Jatta (2012), Lucky Di Unlucky Story (2013), Vaisakhi List (2016). He further directed Viyaah Kartaare Da, starring Nimrat Khaira and Gippy Grewal, which released on 27 February 2026.

== Directing career ==
Despite directing films such as Meri Vahuti Da Viyah (2007) and Chak De Phatte (2008), Smeep Kang rose to popularity as a director in 2012 with the comedy film Carry On Jatta, which became a Blockbuster, and also one of the highest-grossing Punjabi feature films of that year. He again teamed up with most of the cast of Carry On Jatta in 2013, with comedy film Lucky Di Unlucky Story. This film also became a box office success. Following this, he directed Bhaji in Problem, which managed to do good business at the box office but wasn't as successful as his last two films.

== Filmography ==
Key
†	Denotes films that have not yet been released

Year	Film	Actor	Director	Producer	Writer	Language	Notes
1999	Mahaul Theek Hai	Vicky	No	No	No	Punjabi	
2006	Ek Jind Ek Jaan	Pal Jindal	No	No	No	Punjabi	
2006	Dil Apna Punjabi	Yes	No	No	No	Punjabi	Cameo
2007	Kaafila	Makhan Singh	No	No	No	Hindi	
2007	Meri Vahuti Da Viyah	Sikander	Yes	Yes	No	Punjabi	Co-directed with Ksshitij Chaudhary; Direct-to-video film
2008	Chak De Phatte	Smeep	Yes	No	Yes	Punjabi	
2008	26 July at Barista	Yes	No	No	No	Hindi	
2011	Yaara o Dildaara	No	No	Executive	Yes	Punjabi	
2012	Carry On Jatta	No	Yes	No	Yes	Punjabi	
2013	Lucky Di Unlucky Story	Veer Ji	Yes	Yes	Yes	Punjabi	
2013	Bhaji in Problem	No	Yes	No	Yes	Punjabi	
2014	Double Di Trouble	No	Yes	No	Yes	Punjabi	
2014	Mr & Mrs 420	No	No	No	Yes	Punjabi	
2015	Second Hand Husband	No	Yes	No	Yes	Hindi	
2016	Vaisakhi List	No	Yes	No	Yes	Punjabi	
2016	Lock	Yes	Yes	No	No	Punjabi	
2018	Laavan Phere	Jeet Singh	Yes	No	No	Punjabi	
2018	Carry on Jatta 2	Yes	Yes	No	No	Punjabi	
2018	Vadhayiyaan Ji Vadhayiyaan	No	Yes	No	No	Punjabi	
2019	Band Vaaje	Yes	Yes	No	No	Punjabi	
2019	Naukar Vahuti Da	Producer	Yes	Yes	No	Punjabi	
2019	Jhootha Kahin Ka	No	Yes	No	No	Hindi	
2022	Bai Ji Kuttange	No	Yes	No	No	Punjabi	
2023	Gol Gappe	No	Yes	No	No	Punjabi	
2023	Carry on Jatta 3	No	Yes	No	No	Punjabi	
2023	Gaddi Jaandi Ae Chalaangaan Maardi	No	Yes	No	No	Punjabi	
2023	Maujaan Hi Maujaan	No	Yes	No	No	Punjabi	
2024	Jeonde Raho Bhoot Ji	No	Yes	No	No	Punjabi	
