= Roshan Prince =

Indian singer, actor and producer

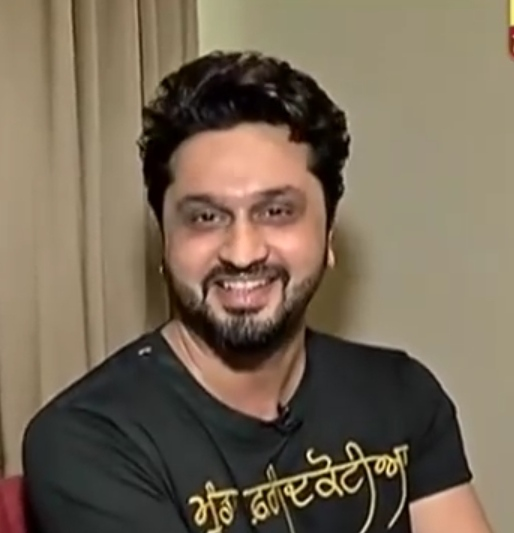

Background information
- Genres: Bhangra, Indi-pop
- Occupations: Record producer, musician, music director, singer-songwriter and actor
- Years active: 2006–present

Roshan Prince is an Indian singer, producer, musician, songwriter and actor known for his Punjabi-language Bhangra songs.

In 2012, he starred alongside Preet Harpal and Monica Bedi in the romantic comedy film Sirphire. The film featured his popular song "Look/Lak.

== Filmography ==
- 2009, Lagda Ishq Ho Gaya
- 2012, Sirphire
- 2012, Kabaddi Once Again
- 2013, Fer Mamla Gadbad Gadbad
- 2013, Naughty Jatts
- 2013, Lucky Di Unlucky Story
- 2014, Mundeyan Ton Bachke Rahin
- 2014, Kirpaan - The Sword of Honour
- 2014, Ishq Brandy
- 2015, Singh of Festival
- 2016, Aatishbazi ishq
- 2016, Main Teri Tu Mera
- 2019, Munda Faridkotia
- 2020, Rang Ratta
- 2022, Beautiful Billo
