= Chandigarh Amritsar Chandigarh =

2019 Indian Punjabi-language romantic comedy film

- Theatrical release poster
- Directed by: Karan Guliani
- Screenplay by: Naresh Kathooria
- Produced by: Sumit Dutt; Anupama Katkar; Eara Dutt; Abbiy Obheroii (Executive Producer)
- Starring: Gippy Grewal; Sargun Mehta; Rajpal Yadav
- Cinematography: Manoj Soni
- Edited by: Rohit Dhiman
- Music by: Jatinder Shah
- Production company: Leostride Entertainment
- Distributed by: Omjee Group
- Release date: 24 May 2019
- Country: India
- Language: Punjabi

Chandigarh Amritsar Chandigarh is a 2019 Indian-Punjabi romantic comedy film written by Naresh Kathooria and directed by Karan Guliani. Produced by Sumit Dutt & Dreembook Productions in association with Leostride Entertainment; it stars Gippy Grewal, Sargun Mehta, and Rajpal Yadav in lead roles. It is an official remake of a 2010 Marathi film Mumbai-Pune-Mumbai. The film was released on 24 May 2019.

== Cast ==
- Gippy Grewal as Rajveer
- Sargun Mehta as Reet
- Rajpal Yadav as Murari
- Dilpreet Dhillon as Prince (Reet's boyfriend)

== Soundtrack ==
Chandigarh Amritsar Chandigarh

Soundtrack album by Jatinder Shah
- Released: 6 May 2019
- Recorded: 2019
- Genre: Feature film soundtrack
- Length: 18:07
- Label: Times Music
External audio
- Audio Jukebox on YouTube

The soundtrack and background score of the film is composed by Jatinder Shah while lyrics are by Maninder Kailey and Ricky Khan. The album was released on 21 May 2019.

Track listing
No.	Title	Lyrics	Music	Singer(s)	Length
1.	"Ambersar De Papad"	Maninder Kailey	Jatinder Shah	Sunidhi Chauhan & Gippy Grewal	2:59
2.	"Aaja Billo Katthe Nachiye"	Ricky Khan	Jatinder Shah	Gippy Grewal	3:25
3.	"Chal Dila"	Ricky Khan	Jatinder Shah	Ricky Khan	3:20
4.	"Beautiful Jatti"	Maninder Kailey	Jatinder Shah	Gippy Grewal	2:02
5.	"Rab Ne Milaya"	Ricky Khan	Jatinder Shah	Kamal Khan	4:13
6.	"Mattha"	Maninder Kailey	Jatinder Shah	Gippy Grewal	2:08
Total length:					18:07

== Marketing and release ==
Chandigarh Amritsar Chandigarh was released worldwide on 24 May 2019 by Omjee Group.

== Reception ==
Box office

Chandigarh Amritsar Chandigarh netted ₹51 lakhs on its opening day in India.
