= B. N. Sharma =

Indian actor (born 1956)

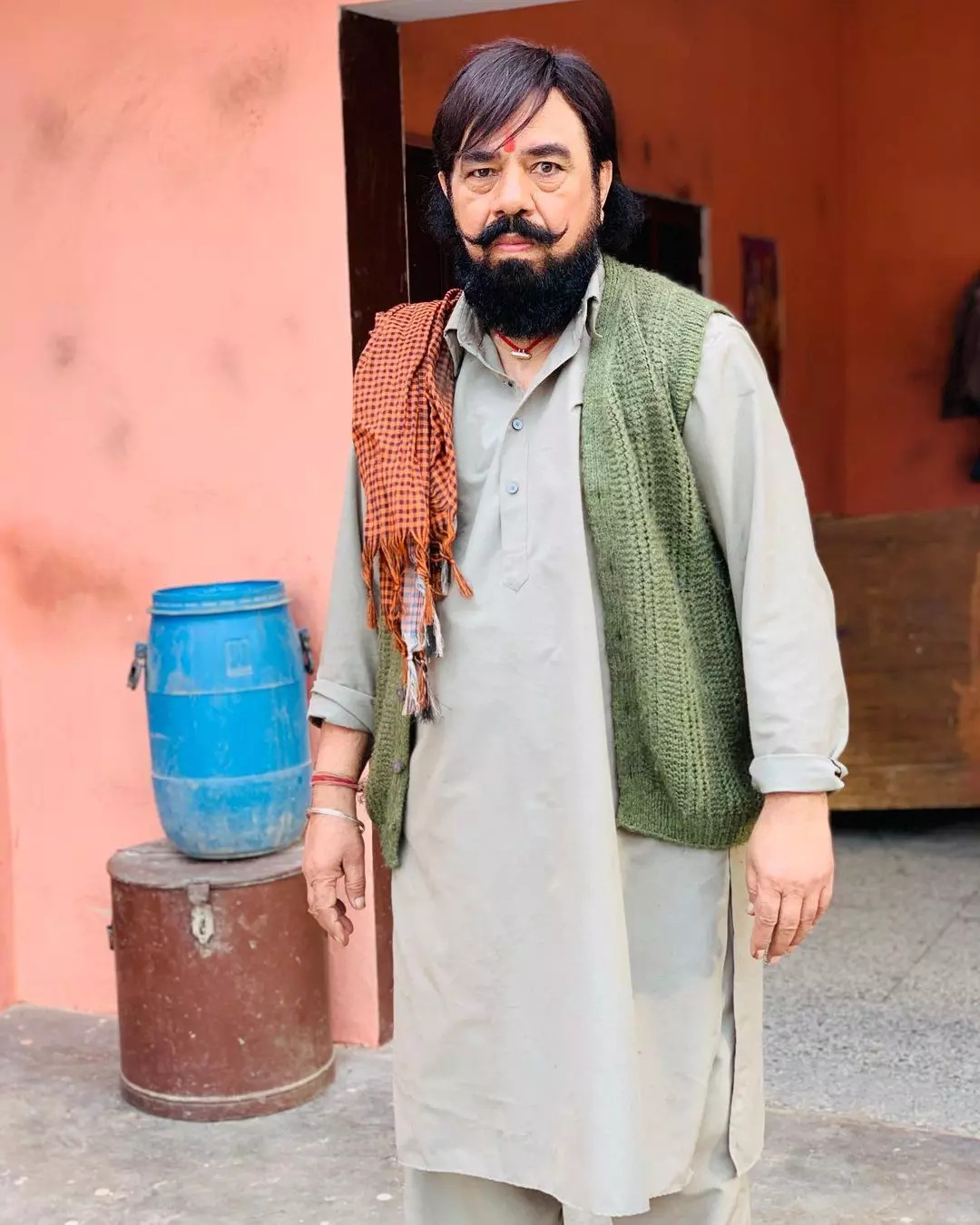
- B. N. Sharma
- Born: 23 August 1956 (age 69); Bharathgarh, Rupnagar district, Punjab, India
- Occupation: Actor
- Years active: 1985–present
- Children: 4

Bhola Nath Sharma is an Indian actor. He began his career in a Punjabi soap, Jeb Katre on Jalandhar Doordarshan and comedy serial Flop Show. He is known for his roles in such films as Mahaul Theek Hai, Jatt and Juliet and Carry On Jatta.

== Personal life ==
B. N. Sharma (Bhola Nath Sharma) is an actor in the Punjabi film industry. He was born in Ropar and raised in Delhi in a Punjabi Hindu Brahmin family originally from Gujranwala who migrated in 1947 during Partition of India. Although his parents wished for him to pursue a career in engineering, he moved to Chandigarh in 1972 and served in the Punjab Police department while pursuing a career in acting after developing a love for theater. During his service as a constable he completed 40–45 movies. He has 3 sons (triplet) and a daughter.

== Career ==
He began his acting career with a negative character in Jalandhar Doordarshan's Punjabi soap Jeb Katre (Pocket Pickers) in 1985. His first movie was Vaisakhi (1987), which was a hit. He acted as a recurring and different character in hit series Flop Show in 1989. He later collaborated with Jaspal Bhatti in other ventures like Ulta Pulta and Full Tension. He had a minor role in anti corruption comic film Mahaul Theek Hai (1999) followed by major roles in over 70 Punjabi films. His recent hits include Jatt and Juliet, the quasi-sequel Jatt and Juliet 2 and Carry On Jatta. Sharma won the Best Actor in a Comic Role award at the PTC Punjabi Film Awards.

He has been acclaimed by directors for the perfection he puts in his work.

"I was so fascinated by acting that I wanted to become a part of it at any cost," Sharma told Punjabi Mania. "I remember when I was a kid (even before I started going school), I used to buy a flute from a balloon seller and play it. Now I realize that it was an art. As my father was quite rigid I had to take the extreme step and now with the hard work and love of all I am doing well."

During an interview with Punjabi Mania, Sharma also stated: "I just think that the Punjab government must do something fruitful for Punjabi cinema too like they are doing in promotion of sports which is a good thing too. Punjabi cinema is doing wonders now and our government must contribute something to make it internationally renowned."

== Filmography ==
Key
†	Denotes films that have not yet been released

Year	Title	Role	Director	Notes	Language
1971	Badnam Farishte		Qamar Narvi	Child Star	Hindi
1979	Surakksha		Ravikant Nagaich	Background sound editor	Hindi
1985	Raajniti		Thakur Tapasvi		Hindi
1990	Rani Kokilan	Rasalu	Lalit Behl	TV film	Punjabi
1990	Jatt Punjab Daa	Qaidon Chacha	Yograj Singh		Punjabi
1999	Mahaul Theek Hai	Billu Bakra	Jaspal Bhatti		Punjabi
2001	Gadar Ek Prem Katha	Officer at Pakistan Embassy	Anil Sharma		Hindi
2012	Jatt & Juliet	Gunoshan Singh Chawla	Anurag Singh		Punjabi
2012	Carry On Jatta	Inspector Sikandar Singh Tiwana	Smeep Kang		Punjabi
2013	Jatt & Juliet 2	Gunoshan Singh Chawla	Anurag Singh		Punjabi
2013	Aashiqui Not Allowed	Billu Bakra	Rakesh Dhawan		Punjabi
2014	Ishq Brandy	King Don	Amit Prasher		Punjabi
2014	Marriage Da Garriage	Paana			Punjabi
2014	Bhaji in Problem	Bhawalpuria Jeweller	Smeep Kang		Punjabi
2016	Ardaas	Subedar Saab	Gippy Grewal		Punjabi
2016	Vaisakhi List	Sub-inspector Bahadur Singh	Smeep Kang		Punjabi
2016	Aatishbazi Ishq				Punjabi
2017	Manje Bistre	Sureela	Baljit Singh Deo		Punjabi
2018	Golak Bugni Bank Te Batua	Aneja Halwai	Ksshitij Chaudhary		Punjabi
2018	Raduaa		Nav Bajwa		Punjabi
2018	Carry On Jatta 2	Billu Bansal	Smeep Kang		Punjabi
2018	Mar Gaye Oye Loko	Doctor	Simerjit Singh		Punjabi
2019	Uda Aida	Jagtar Singh	Ksshitij Chaudhary		Punjabi
2019	Munda Faridkotia	Mubaaraq	Mandeep Singh Chahal		
2019	Rabb Da Radio 2	Mistri Mama	Sharan Art		
2021	Kade Haan Kade Naa		Sunil Thakur		Punjabi
2021	Teeja Punjab	Sarpanch	Amberdeep Singh		Punjabi
2022	Galwakdi	Jagteshwar's Father	Sharan Art		Punjabi
2023	Gol Gappe	Nathuram	Smeep Kang		Punjabi
2023	Carry On Jatta 3	Bansal	Smeep Kang		Punjabi
2023	Gaddi Jaandi Ae Chalaangaan Maardi	TBA	Smeep Kang	Yet to be released	Punjabi
2023	Sidhus of Southall				
2024	Jatt & Juliet 3	Shampy's Dad			Punjabi
2025	Sardaar Ji 3	Jaggi's ustad			Punjabi
2025	Sarbala Ji	Gajjan's father			Punjabi
2026	"carry on jatta 4"	reet's father			Punjabi
