= Jaswinder Bhalla =

Indian actor and comedian (1960–2025)

- Bhalla in 2017
- Born: 4 May 1960; Doraha, Ludhiana, Punjab, India
- Died: 22 August 2025 (aged 65); Mohali, Punjab, India
- Other name: Chacha Chatar Singh
- Education: Punjab Agricultural University
- Occupations: Actor; stand-up comedian
- Years active: 1988–2025
- Spouse: Parmdeep Bhalla
- Children: 2, including Pukhraj Bhalla
- Notable work: Jatt & Juliet; Carry On Jatta; Mahaul Theek Hai; Chhankata series

Comedy career
- Genres: Comedy; films; stage

Jaswinder Bhalla (4 May 1960 – 22 August 2025) was an Indian actor and comedian who worked in Punjabi cinema. He started his professional career as a comedian in 1988 with Chhankata and became an actor with film Dulla Bhatti (1998). He was best known for his comedy series Chhankata and comedy roles in various Punjabi films. He also performed in stage acts and toured Canada and Australia for his stage show Naughty Baba in Town.

== Early life ==
Bhalla was born in the village Kaddon city of Doraha, Punjab on 4 May 1960. His father Master Bahadur Singh Bhalla was a primary school teacher in village Barmalipur. He got his basic education from Senior Secondary School Doraha.

== Education and career ==
Bhalla did his B.Sc. and M.Sc. from Punjab Agricultural University, and his Ph.D. from Chaudhary Charan Singh Post Graduate College, Meerut. He began his career as an assistant professor in the PAU, and was serving as a Professor and Head, Department of Extension Education when he retired from active service on 31 May 2020.

== Comedy career ==
Bhalla and two of his schoolmates were selected for All India Radio in 1975. As a student at Punjab Agricultural University, Bhalla had performed comedy performances in university programmes. He started his professional career in 1988 along with co-performer Bal Mukand Sharma with audio cassette Chhankata 1988. Bal Mukand Sharma and Bhalla were classmates in Punjab Agriculture University. The word "chhankata" originated from the college level annual show performed by Bhalla and Sharma in PAU, that was later used as the name for his famous comedy series. They were noticed by Doordarshan Kendra, Jalandhar while performing in Professor Mohan Singh Mela on the personal backing of Punjabi author Jagdev Singh Jassowal. He had released over 27 audio and video albums of the Chhankata series. Apart from Bal Mukand Sharma, Neelu Sharma has also been part of the Chhankata series. Starting with Chhankata in 2002, the series was also released in the form of video cassettes.

== Popular characters ==
In his Chhankata series, Bhalla portrayed many characters carefully chosen from all walks of Punjabi society. One of the main characters is Chacha Chatar Singh, who is an old villager and talks about Punjab's politics, differences between rural and urban life, and tells jokes from all walks of life. Another character he portrayed is Bhana, a youngster from Chatar Singh's village who has emigrated to the US and appears in the Chhankata as NRI. JB, another character portrayed by Bhalla, is the son of Chatar Singh. Another notable character is Taya Fumhan Singh.

== Film career ==
Bhalla worked in Punjabi movies like Mahaul Theek Hai, Jija Ji, Jihne Mera Dil Luteya, Power cut, Kabaddi Once Again, Apan Phir Milange, Mel Kara De Rabba, Carry On Jatta, Jatt and Juliet, and Jatt Airways. In some Punjabi films, he always spoke with different Takia Klams (transl. catchphrase), such as Mein Taa Bhannduu Bullan Naal Akhrote, Je Chandigarh Dhaijoo Pinda Warga Taa Rehjooo and Dhillon Ne Kaalaa Cot Aiven Ni Payeya. He stated that through his art, he highlighted social taboos like abortion, drugs and unemployment.

== Other ventures ==
Bhalla served as a brand ambassador for Atulaya Healthcare, a leading diagnostic and imaging services provider in North India. He appeared in television commercials, press campaigns, and promotional events for the brand. The advertising campaigns were conceptualised and executed by Antraajaal, a Chandigarh-based branding and marketing agency, which managed Bhalla's television advertisements and social media promotions for Atulaya Healthcare.

In addition, Bhalla was also appointed as the brand ambassador for Punjab Agricultural University (PAU), where he promoted the university's agricultural research and outreach initiatives. Even after his retirement, he remained actively associated with PAU, helping the institution connect with farmers and spread awareness on agricultural development.

== Controversy ==
In his album Chhankata in 2003, Bhalla was accused by certain ragi jathas of making mockery of them and raised strong objections to his album. An apology was issued by the artists and producer of the album. His 2009 album Mithe Pochey also faced ire of Nambardaars of various villages in Punjab for his satire on them. He was allegedly assaulted by Punjab government officials due to his satire on government.

== Personal life and death ==
Bhalla was married to Paramdeep Bhalla, a teacher of fine arts. Their marriage produced two children, one of who is Pukhraj Bhalla.

Bhalla died on 22 August 2025, at the age of 65. He died at Fortis Hospital in Mohali, Punjab, following complications from a stroke. It was reported that Bhalla had suffered the stroke on 20 August 2025 and was admitted to the hospital shortly thereafter.

Bhalla's remains were cremated during a ceremony on 23 August 2025, at the Balongi Cremation Ground in Mohali, where family, friends and colleagues from the Punjabi entertainment industry gathered to pay their respects.

== Filmography ==
Year	Film	Role	Notes
1998	Dulla Bhatti		
1999	Mahaul Theek Hai	Inspector Jaswinder Bhalla	
2003	Badla The Revenge	Amaru	
2005	Nalaik	Sajja Singh	
2006	Jija Ji		
2007	Billian Ch Bandar		
2007	Babal Da Vehra	Massar	
2008	Layi Lagg	Kikkar Singh	
2008	Chak De Phatte	JB	
2010	Mel Karade Rabba	Rajvir's Mama	
2011	Jihne Mera Dil Luteya	Prof. Bhalla	
2012	Aappan Pher Milange	Gora Gappi	
2012	Jatt and Juliet	Joginder Singh	
2012	Kabaddi Once Again	Coach Suchha Singh Sandhu	
2012	Carry On Jatta	Advocate Dhillon	
2012	Raula Pai Gaya	Prof. Bhalla	
2012	Power Cut	Baalla	
2013	Stupid 7	Parry's Grandfather	With his son Pukhraj Bhalla
2013	Daddy Cool Munde Fool	Parminder Singh Puppy	
2013	Lucky Di Unlucky Story	Gurvinder Brar	
2013	Rangeelay	Retd.DSP Baldev Singh	
2013	Jatts In Golmaal	Balli Chacha	
2013	Jatt & Juliet 2	Inspector Joginder Singh	
2013	Jatt Boys - Putt Jattan De	Prof. Parwana	
2013	Jatt Airways	Shamsher Sandhu	
2013	Viyah 70 km	Piyara Singh Lotte	
2013	RSVP - Ronde Saare Vyah Picho		
2013	Jatt in Mood		
2013	Just U & Me		
2014	Marriage Da Garriage	Chaabi	
2014	Yaaran Da Katchup	Sukhbir Singh Sohi	
2014	Saada Jawai NRI		
2014	Oh My Pyo	Mama	
2014	Mr. & Mrs. 420	Subedaar	
2014	Jatt Risky		
2015	Sardaar Ji	Armeek Singh	
2015	Munde Kamaal De	Balwant Singh Sidhu	
2015	Myself Pendu		
2016	Vaisakhi List	Jailer Jalaur Singh Johal	
2016	Sardaar Ji 2	Pathaan Chacha	
2017	Saab Bahadar	Munshi	
2017	Krazzy Tabbar	Bhullar	
2017	Vekh Baraatan Challiyan	Jaggi's Father	
2018	Golak Bugni Bank Te Batua	Neeta's Father	
2018	Carry on Jatta 2	Advocate Dhillon	
2018	Vadhayiyaan Ji Vadhayiyaan	Bhullar	
2018	Ashke	Bhangra Coach Pritam Singh Pandori	
2018	Mr & Mrs 420 Returns	Bhullar	
2018	Mar Gaye Oye Loko	Dharmraj	
2018	Marriage Palace	Tara Chand Brar	
2019	Band Vaaje	Bajwa	
2019	Jind Jaan	Mama	
2019	Naukar Vahuti Da	Professor Bhalla	
2019	Kitty Party	Bajwa	
2021	Jinne Jamme Saare Nikamme	Niranjan Singh	ZEE5 film
2022	Mahi Mera Nikka Jeha	Boota	
2022	Saamna	Karamjeet	Adult Feature Film
2023	Carry on Jatta 3	Advocate Dhillon	
2023	Gaddi Jaandi Ae Chalaangaan Maardi	TBA	
2023	Sardaarji 3	TBA	Adult Feature Film
2023	Yaaran Diyan Poun Baaran		
2024	Fer Maamlaa Gadbad Hai		
2024	Jigar Da Tukda		Adult Feature Film
2024	Shinda Shinda No Papa		
2026	Carry on Jatta 4	Advocate Dhillon	Posthumous appearance via computer generated imagery (AI generated) Voice Dubbing Gippy Grewal and Modulation by AI
