= Gippy Grewal =

Indian actor and singer

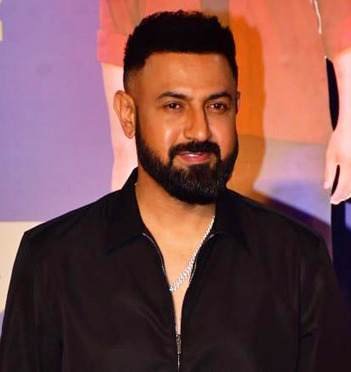
- Gippy Grewal in 2024
- Born: Rupinder Singh Grewal; 2 January 1983 (age 43); Ludhiana, Punjab, India
- Occupations: Singer; actor; filmmaker
- Spouse: Ravneet Kaur Grewal
- Children: 3
- Relatives: Sippy Grewal (brother)
- Musical career
- Genres: Panjabi; Bhangra; Romantic; Pop; Sikh
- Labels: Humble Music; Speed Records; T-Series; Moviebox Records; Tips; Saga Music; Panj-aab Records
- Website: gippygrewal.com

Rupinder Singh "Gippy" Grewal (born 2 January 1983) is an Indian actor, singer, film director and producer whose works span over Punjabi and Hindi film industry.

His single "Phulkari" was very successful in the Punjabi music industry. He made his acting debut in the 2010 movie, Mel Karade Rabba, and which he followed with Carry On Jatta, Lucky Di Unlucky Story, Bhaji in Problem and Jatt James Bond. He revived "PTC Best Actor Award" in 2011 for his performance in the 2011 film Jihne Mera Dil Luteya. He received the "PIFAA Best Actor Award" in 2012 along with Diljit Dosanjh and received "PTC Best Actor Award" in 2015 for Jatt James Bond along with Diljit Dosanjh. He is owner of production houses Humble Motion Pictures and Big Daddy Films along with his brother Sippy Grewal.

== Personal life ==
Grewal was born in Ludhiana and his hometown is Koom Kalan village, Ludhiana. He did his schooling from Nankana Sahib Public School, Kot Gangu Rai and studied at North India Institute of Hotel Management, Panchkula. His brother Sippy Grewal is a distributor based in Australia.

Grewal is married to Ravneet Kaur and has three sons.

== Music career ==
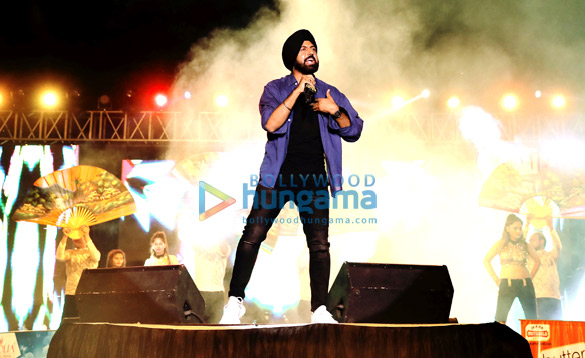
Grewal performing live in Chandigarh

Grewal made his debut with the album Chakkh Lai was produced by Atul Sharma. Before his fame though he was a wedding singer. He frequently performed at weddings in Punjab, India. He followed with the albums Aaja Ve Mitraa, Mele Mitraan De, Phulkari 2 and many more. He became a famous name in Punjabi Music among the audience. In 2010, his eighth album "Desi Rockstar" produced by Aman Hayer was a huge hit and was very much loved by Audience. After the album he released song "Angreji Beat" with Yo Yo Honey Singh which proved to be one of the most successful songs of his career. He enjoyed the prime time of stardom during the period of 2010-2014, making him one of the leading artists in Punjabi music industry. In 2012, "Angreji Beat", was also featured in the Bollywood film Cocktail.

The video for his 2013 single "Hello Hello" was shot in Las Vegas, Nevada. He performed at the Sandwell and Birmingham Mela in 2014.

== Film career ==
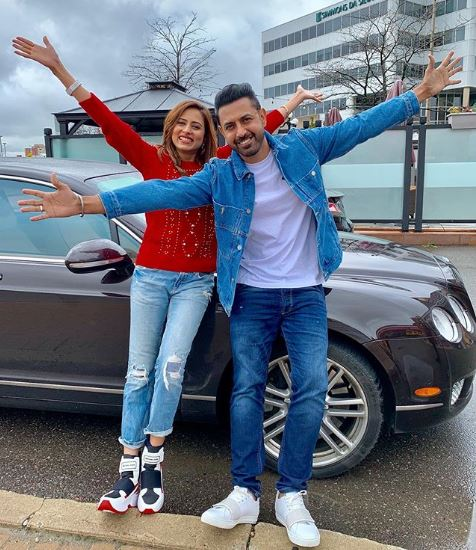
Gippy Grewal with Sargun Mehta during the promotions of Chandigarh Amritsar Chandigarh

Grewal made his film debut as the main antagonist in 2010 Punjabi-language film Mel Karade Rabba. He followed that up with a lead role in Jihne Mera Dil Luteya which became the biggest hit in Punjabi cinema when it released. In April 2012 his film Mirza – The Untold Story released with the highest opening for a Punjabi film at the time.

His next movie Carry On Jatta released in July 2012 and had the second highest opening and total collections for Punjabi film. In 2013, Grewal released the action film Singh vs Kaur and comedy films Lucky Di Unlucky Story, Best of Luck and Bhaji in Problem.

In 2014, he appeared in the dramatic thriller Jatt James Bond. His second film of 2014 was the comedy film Double Di Trouble.

He lent his voice for dubbing in the Punjabi version of A Good Day to Die Hard, which was the first Hollywood movie to be dubbed in Punjabi.

In 2015, Grewal entered Bollywood with a guest appearance, portraying pop star Manjeet Manchala in the comedy-drama film Dharam Sankat Mein. He then made his lead acting debut in Bollywood with the romantic-comedy film Second Hand Husband.

In 2016, he launched own production house Humble Motion Pictures with his first directional debut Ardaas.

In September 2017, Grewal starred in his most recent Hindi movie, Lucknow Central, along with Farhan Akhtar. Carry on Jatta 2 released on 1 June 2018.

In 2022, he launched a new production house "Big Daddy Films".

== Discography ==
Studio albums

- Chakk Ley (2002)
- Aaja Wey Mitra (2003)
- Mele Mittaran De (2004)
- Phulkari 2 (2005)
- Akh Larh Gayi (Canada & India)
  - The Album (UK) (2006)
- Chandi De Challe (Canada & India)
  - Im Here (UK) (2007)
- My Time To Shine (2008)
- Desi Rockstar (2010)
- Talwar (2011)
- Desi Rockstar 2 (2016)
- The Main Man (2020)
- Limited Edition (2021)

== Filmography ==
Key
| † | Denotes films that have not yet been released |

=== Actor ===
| Year | Film | Role | Actor | Producer | Director | Writer | Notes | Language |
|---|---|---|---|---|---|---|---|---|
| 2010 | Mel Karade Rabba | Nihal Dhasah | Yes | No | No | No | Punjabi film debut | Punjabi |
| 2011 | Jihne Mera Dil Luteya | Yuvraaj Singh Randhawa | Yes | No | No | No | | Punjabi |
| 2012 | Mirza: The Untold Story | Mirza | Yes | No | No | No | | Punjabi |
| 2012 | Carry On Jatta | Jass Dhillon | Yes | Yes | No | No | Co-producer | Punjabi |
| 2013 | Singh vs Kaur | Nihal Singh | Yes | No | No | No | | Punjabi |
| 2013 | Lucky Di Unlucky Story | Lucky | Yes | Yes | No | No | Co-producer | Punjabi |
| 2013 | Best of Luck | Kullu | Yes | Yes | No | No | Co-producer | Punjabi |
| 2013 | Bhaji in Problem | Jeeta | Yes | No | No | No | | Punjabi |
| 2014 | Jatt James Bond | Shinda | Yes | No | No | No | | Punjabi |
| 2014 | Double Di Trouble | Fateh/Ekam (Double role) | Yes | No | No | No | | Punjabi |
| 2015 | Second Hand Husband | Rajbir | Yes | No | No | No | Hindi film debut | Hindi |
| 2015 | Faraar | Shinda/Ekam (Double role) | Yes | No | No | No | | Punjabi |
| 2016 | Ardaas | Sukhi | Yes | Yes | Yes | Yes | Cameo appearance | Punjabi |
| 2016 | Kaptaan | Advocate Kaptaan Singh | Yes | No | No | No | | Punjabi |
| 2016 | Lock | Bhola | Yes | No | No | No | | Punjabi |
| 2017 | Manje Bistre | Sukhi | Yes | Yes | No | Yes | | Punjabi |
| 2017 | Lucknow Central | Parminder Singh Gill (Pali) | Yes | No | No | No | | Hindi |
| 2018 | Subedar Joginder Singh | Joginder Singh | Yes | No | No | No | | Punjabi |
| 2018 | Carry on Jatta 2 | Jass | Yes | No | No | No | | Punjabi |
| 2018 | Mar Gaye Oye Loko | Tittu | Yes | Yes | No | Yes | | Punjabi |
| 2019 | Manje Bistre 2 | Sukhi | Yes | Yes | No | Yes | | Punjabi |
| 2019 | Chandigarh Amritsar Chandigarh | Rajveer | Yes | No | No | No | | Punjabi |
| 2019 | Ardaas Karaan | Sehaj | Yes | Yes | Yes | Yes | Co-writer with Rana Ranbir | Punjabi |
| 2019 | Daaka | Shinda | Yes | Yes | No | Yes | Co-producer | Punjabi |
| 2020 | Ik Sandhu Hunda Si | Sandhu | Yes | No | No | No | | Punjabi |
| 2021 | Paani Ch Madhaani | Gulli | Yes | No | No | No | | Punjabi |
| 2021 | Warning | Geja | Yes | Yes | No | Yes | Cameo Appearance | Punjabi |
| 2021 | Shava Ni Girdhari Lal | Magghar Singh Sandhu (Girdhari Lal) | Yes | Yes | Yes | No | | Punjabi |
| 2022 | Posti | —N/a | No | Yes | No | No | Starring Babbal Rai | Punjabi |
| 2022 | Maa | Jora | Yes | Yes | No | No | | Punjabi |
| 2022 | Saamna | Gurpreet singh (Gippy) | | | | | | Punjabi |
| 2022 | Yaar Mera Titliyaan Warga | Gurmail Singh | Yes | Yes | No | No | | Punjabi |
| 2022 | Honeymoon | Deep | Yes | No | No | No | | Punjabi |
| 2022 | Snowman | —N/a | No | Yes | No | No | | Punjabi |
| 2023 | Mitran Da Naa Chalda | Laadi | Yes | No | No | No | With Tania | Punjabi |
| 2023 | Carry on Jatta 3 | Jass | Yes | Yes | No | No | | Punjabi |
| 2023 | Maujaan Hi Maujaan | | Yes | No | No | No | | Punjabi |
| 2024 | Shinda Shinda No Papa | Gopi | Yes | Yes | No | No | | Punjabi |
| 2024 | Warning 2 | Geja | Yes | Yes | No | Yes | | Punjabi |
| 2024 | Jatt Nuu Chudail Takri | | Yes | No | No | No | | Punjabi |
| 2025 | Akaal: The Unconquered | Sardar Akal Singh | Yes | Yes | Yes | Yes | | Punjabi |
| 2025 | Sarbala Ji | Sucha | Yes | No | No | No | | Punjabi |
| 2025 | Phatte Dinde Chakk Punjabi† | | Yes | Yes | No | No | Completed | |
| 2025 | Manje Bistre 3 † | Sukhi | Yes | Yes | No | No | | |
| 2025 | Widow Colony† | | Yes | Yes | No | No | | |

=== Special appearances ===
| Year | Film | Role | Sources |
|---|---|---|---|
| 2011 | Dharti | Himself | |
| 2015 | Dharam Sankat Mein | Manjeet Manchala | |
| 2016 | Ardaas | Sukhi | |
| 2018 | Asees | | |

=== Dubbing roles ===
| Year | Film | Role | Original Actor | Original language | Dubbed language |
|---|---|---|---|---|---|
| 2013 | A Good Day To Die Hard | Jack | Jae Courtesy | English | Punjabi |

== Awards and nominations ==
| Year | Film | Award Ceremony | Category | Result |
|---|---|---|---|---|
| 2009 | Mel Karade Rabba | PTC Punjabi Film Awards | Best Male Debut | Nominated |
| 2009 | Mel Karade Rabba | PTC Punjabi Film Awards | Best Villain | Nominated |
| 2011 | | PTC Punjabi Film Awards | Punjabi Music Best Folk pop Album Award | Won |
| 2011 | Jihne Mera Dil Luteya | PTC Punjabi Film Awards | Best Actor (tied with) Diljit Dosanjh for Jihne Mera Dil Luteya | Won |
| 2012 | | PTC Punjabi Film Awards | Punjabi Music Most Popular song of the year | Won |
| 2012 | Mirza: The Untold Story | PTC Punjabi Film Awards | Best Actor | Nominated |
| 2012 | Mirza: The Untold Story | PTC Punjabi Film Awards | Critics Best Actor | Won |
| 2012 | Carry On Jatta | PTC Punjabi Film Awards | Best Actor | Nominated |
| 2012 | Mirza: The Untold Story; Carry On Jatta | PTC Punjabi Film Awards | Best Popular Star Of The Year | Won |
| 2013 | Singh vs Kaur | PTC Punjabi Film Awards | Best Actor | Nominated |
| 2014 | Jatt James Bond | PTC Punjabi Film Awards | Best Actor | Won |
| 2014 | | PTC Punjabi Film Awards | Entertainer of The Year | Won |
| 2015 | Faraar | PTC Punjabi Film Awards | Best Actor | Nominated |
| 2016 | Kaptaan | PTC Punjabi Film Awards | Most Popular song of the year | Won |
| 2016 | Ardaas | PTC Punjabi Film Awards | Best Director | Nominated |
| 2016 | Ardaas | PTC Punjabi Film Awards | Best Debut Director | Won |
| 2016 | Ardaas | PTC Punjabi Film Awards | Best Screenplay | Nominated |
| 2016 | Ardaas | PTC Punjabi Film Awards | Best Story | Nominated |
| 2016 | Kaptaan | PTC Punjabi Film Awards | Best Actor | Nominated |
| 2016 | Ardaas | Filmfare Awards Punjabi | Best Director | Nominated |
| 2016 | Ardaas | Filmfare Awards Punjabi | Best Debut Director | Won |
| 2016 | Ardaas | Filmfare Awards Punjabi | Best Original Story | Won |
| 2016 | Kaptaan | Filmfare Awards Punjabi | Best Actor | Nominated |
| 2017 | Manje Bistre | Filmfare Awards Punjabi | Best Actor | Nominated |
| 2017 | Manje Bistre | Filmfare Awards Punjabi | Best Original Story | Nominated |
| 2017 | Manje Bistre | Filmfare Awards Punjabi | Best Screenplay | Won |
| 2017 | Manje Bistre | Brit Asia Awards | Best Actor | Won |
| 2017 | | Punjabi Music Awards | Best Duat vocalist(With Neha Kakkar) for patt Lain ge | Won |
| 2018 | Carry on Jatta 2 | PTC Punjabi Film Awards | Best Actor | Won |
| 2018 | Carry on Jatta 2 | Brit Asia Awards | Best Actor | Won |
| 2020 | Ardaas Karaan | PTC Punjabi Film Awards | Best Director | Won |
| 2020 | Ardaas Karaan | PTC Punjabi Film Awards | Best Film | Won |

== Controversy ==
Grewal faced strong opposition in Punjab over his film Akaal: The Unconquered. Several Sikh organisations protested against the film, raising questions about Grewal’s character as well. These groups claimed that the film distorted Sikh history, pointing out that there is no historical evidence of the main character, Akaal Singh. Moreover, the film shows several Sikh characters consuming meat and alcohol, which goes against Sikh religious beliefs. Grewal was also criticised for wearing a fake beard in his role, which many people found disrespectful. Questions were also raised about Nimrat Khaira’s character. Additionally, several screenings of the film were cancelled at various locations.
