= Baljit Singh Deo =

- Occupation: Director / Cinematographer / Photographer

Baljit Singh Deo is a film Director and cinematographer known for his work in the Punjabi film industry.

== Early life ==
Baljit Singh Deo was born in Jalandhar, Punjab, India and later moved to England, where he studied microelectronic engineering.

== Career ==
After working in engineering, including roles at Motorola and EA Sports, Deo transitioned to filmmaking. He gained recognition for his work in Punjabi music videos and films, including Jag Jeondeyan De Mele starring Harbhajan Maan and Tulip Joshi, and Mirza: The Untold Story. His current projects include Ardaas Sarbat De Bhala Di and Rajni, where he serves as Director of Photography and Creative Adviser, and Manje Bistre 3.

== Director (music videos) ==
- Court Case - Sukhdev Sukha - (Director / Editor / DOP)
- Tu Judaa - Amrinder Gill - (Director / Editor / DOP)
- Tere Bina - Amrinder Gill - (Director / Editor / DOP)
- Dildarian - Amrinder Gill - (Director / Editor / DOP)
- Jogi Mukhtar Sahota song|Jogi - Mukhtar Sahota - (Director / Editor / DOP)
- Soorma - Jazzy B -(Director / Editor / DOP)
- Nakhro - Jazzy B
- Oh Na Kuri Labde - Jazzy B and Sukshinder Shinda
- Bhuli Visri Kahani - Harbhajan Mann
- Tim Timaunde Tareya - Gurdas Mann
- Punjabi Clap - Sukshinder Shinda - (Director / Editor / DOP)
- Dil Nahi Lagda - Aman Hayer - (Director / Editor / DOP)
- Jugni - Arif Lohar - (Director / Editor / DOP)
- Flower - Gippy Grewal - (Director / Editor / DOP)
- Huthiyar - Gippy Grewal - (Director / Editor / DOP)
- String Is Kinng - BattleKatt
- Hello Hello - Gippy Grewal - (Director / Editor / DOP)
- Patt Lainge - Gippy Grewal
- Hikk Vich Jann - Gippy Grewal - (Director / Editor / DOP)
- Jaan - Gippy Grewal - (Director / Editor / DOP)
- Ghat Boldi - Gippy Grewal - (Director / Editor / DOP)
- Car Nach Di - Gippy Grewal Ft Bohemia (rapper) (Director / Editor / DOP)
- Dark Love - Sidhu Moose Wala - (Director / Editor / DOP)
- Issa Jatt - Sidhu Moose Wala - (Director / Editor / DOP)
- It's All About You - Sidhu Moose Wala - (Director / Editor / DOP)
- Sooraj - Gippy Grewal - (Director / Editor / DOP)
- Hukam - Gippy Grewal - (Director / Editor / DOP)
- Weekend - Gippy Grewal - (Director / Editor / DOP)
- Aar Nanak Par Nanak - Diljit Dosanjh - (Director / Editor / DOP)
- Pagal -Happy Raikoti-(Director / Editor / DOP)
- Shama Payia -Arjan Dhillion and Nimrat Khaira-(Director / Editor / DOP)
- Jaan -Nimrat Khaira-(Director / Editor / DOP)
- Frozi -Nimrat Khaira-(Director / Editor / DOP)
- Score -Arjan Dhillon -(Director / DOP)
- What Ve -Diljit Dosanjh and Nimrat Khaira-(Director / DOP)

== Filmography ==
Key
†	Denotes films that have not yet been released

Year	Film	Cinematographer	Director	Editor	Notes
2009	Jag Jeondeyan De Mele	No	Yes	Yes	
2012	Mirza The Untold Story	No	Yes	No	Nominated for PTC Punjabi Film Award for Best Director
2013	Himmat Singh	No	Yes	No	Delayed
2015	Hero Naam Yaad Rakhi	Yes	Yes	No	
2015	Faraar	Yes	Yes	Yes	
2016	Ardaas	Yes	No	Yes	
2017	Manje Bistre	Yes	Yes	No	
2019	Manje Bistre 2	Yes	Yes	Yes	
2019	Ardaas Karaan	Yes	No	No	
2019	Daaka	Yes	Yes	No	
2021	Honsla Rakh	Yes	No	No	
2021	Shava Ni Girdhari Lal	Yes	No	No	
2022	Maa	Yes	Yes	No	
2022	Babe Bhangra Paunde Ne	Yes	No	No	
2023	Outlaw	Yes	Yes	No	TV Series
2024	Bibi Rajni	Yes	No	No	Creative advisor also
2025	Akaal: The Unconquered	Yes	No	No	
2025	Sardaar Ji 3	Yes	No	No	
