= Arjan Dhillon discography =

Indian singer songwriter discography

- Studio albums: 9
- EPs: 3
- As featured artist: 3
- As songwriter: 19

The discography of Indian singer, rapper and songwriter Arjan Dhillon consists of eight studio albums, one mixtape, three extended plays, thirty-nine singles, including three songs as a featured artist, and nineteen tracks as a songwriter.

== Albums ==
=== Studio albums ===
Title	Details	Peak chart positions	
Title	Details	CAN	NZ
Awara	Released: 25 November 2021; Music: Yeah Proof, Mxrci, Arsh Heer, Desi Crew, J Statik, Jay B Singh .; Label: Brown Studios; Format: Digital download, streaming	—	—
Jalwa	Released: 17 October 2022; Music: Mxrci, The Kidd, Preet Hundal, Jay B Singh, Desi Crew, Yeah Proof; Label: Brown Studios; Format: Digital download, streaming	—	—
A for Arjan	Released: 25 November 2022; Music: Mxrci, The Kidd, Arsh Heer, Jay B Singh, Opi Music, Yeah Proof; Label: Brown Studios; Format: Digital download, streaming	—	—
Saroor	Released: 29 June 2023; Music: Mxrci, The Kidd, Preet Hundal; Label: Panj-Aab Records; Format: Digital download, streaming	7	24
Chobar	Released: 2 February 2024; Music: Mxrci; Label: Brown Studios; Format: Digital download, streaming	10	23
Patander	Released: 11 November 2024; Music: Mxrci; Label: Brown Studios; Format: Digital download, streaming	—	24
A for Arjan 2	Released: 25 August 2025; Music: Mxrci, Arsh Heer, The Culprit, Opi Music; Label: Panj-Aab Records; Format: Digital download, streaming	—	—
Shikhar	Released: 25 August 2025; Music: Various; Label: Brown Studios; Format: Digital download, streaming	—	—
Enigma	Released: 22 May 2026; Music: Mxrci, Arsh Heer, Jay Trak; Label: Panj-Aab Records; Format: Digital download, streaming	8	21

== Extended plays ==
Title	Details
The Future: Volume 1	Released: November 25, 2020; Music: The Kidd, Mxrci; Label: Brown Studios; Format: Digital download, streaming
Gutt	Released: May 26, 2021; Music: Mxrci, Desi Crew; Label: Brown Studios; Format: Digital download, streaming
Vatt Da Raula	Released: November 23, 2021; Music: Desi Crew; Label: Brown Studios; Format: Digital download, streaming
Manifest (with Mxrci)	Released: April 5, 2024; Label: Panj-Aab Records; Format: Digital download, Streaming
The Revolution	Released: February 19, 2025; Music : Mxrci; Label: Panj-Aab Records; Format: Digital download, Streaming

== Singles ==
=== As lead artist ===
Title	Year	Peak chart positions			Music	Album
Title	Year	CAN	UK Asian	UK Punjabi	Music	Album
"Ishq Jeha Ho Gya"	2018	—	—	—	Preet Hundal	Afsar soundtrack
"Shera Samb Lai"	2019	—	—	—	The Kidd	Non-album singles
"Jatt Di Janeman"	2020	—	—	—	The Kidd	Non-album singles
"Uber"	2020	—	—	—	Preet Hundal	Non-album singles
"Bai Bai"	2020	—	—	—	Mxrci	Non-album singles
"My Fellas"	2020	—	—	—	Preet Hundal	Non-album singles
"Kala Jaadu" (featuring Yung Delic)	2020	—	—	—	Mxrci	Non-album singles
"Mull Pyar Da"	2020	—	—	—	Jay B Singh	Non-album singles
"Daaru Sasti"	2020	—	—	—	The Kidd	The Future EP vol.1
"Jatt Disde"	2020	—	—	—	The Kidd	The Future EP vol.1
"Badmashi"	2020	—	—	—	Mxrci	The Future EP vol.1
"Kath"	2020	—	—	—	Mxrci	The Future EP vol.1
"Panjab Kithe Dabda"	2020	—	—	—	Mxrci	
"Soorme Aoun Tareeka Te"	2020	—	—	—	Desi Crew	
"Likhari"	2021	—	—	—	Mxrci	
"Jutti"	2021	—	—	—	Mxrci	
"Gutt"	2021	—	—	—	Mxrci	Gutt
"Ki Pta"	2021	—	—	—	Yeah Proof	
"Jaagde Raho"	2021	—	—	—	Desi Crew	
"Begani Raat"	2021	—	—	—	The Kidd	Gutt
Downtown	2021	—	—	—		Gutt
2 BHK	2021	—	—	—		Gutt
"Pindan De Naa"	2021	—	—	—	Bling Singh	
"Pehli Peshi"	2021	—	—	—	J Statik	
"My Rulez"	2021	—	—	—	Yeah Proof	
"Jaan"	2021	—	—	—		
"Kalli Sohni"	2021	—	—	—	Yeah Proof	
"Vatt Da Raula"	2021	—	—	—	Desi Crew	Vatt Da Raula
"Buckle" (with Gurlez Akhtar)	2021	—	—	—	Desi Crew	Vatt Da Raula
"Score"	2021	—	—	—	Arsh Heer	Awara
"Shamma Payiaan"	2021	—	—	—	Yeah Proof	Awara
"Fire Fur"	2021	—	—	—	Mxrci	Awara
"Hold On"	2021	—	—	—	Desi Crew	Awara
"Mandeer"	2021	—	—	—	J Statik	Awara
"Danabaad"	2021	—	—	—	Yeah Proof	Awara
"Votaan"	2022	—	—	—	Mxrci	
"Jawani"	2022	—	—	—	Mxrci	
Nabzan	2022	—	—	—		
"Setting"	2022	—	—	—	Desi Crew	
"Thabba Ku Zulfan" (Tribute to Shiv Kumar Batalvi)	2022	—	—	—	Yeah Proof	
"Nakhre"	2022	—	—	—	Mxrci	
"Photo" (with Nimrat Khaira)	2022	—	—	—	Preet Hundal	
"Panjab Warga"	2022	—	—	—	Jay B Singh	
"25-25"	2022	—	28	19	Mxrci	Jalwa
"It's My Time"	2022	—	—	—	Mxrci	Jalwa
"Hazur"	2022	—	—	—	Mxrci	Jalwa
"Hommie Call"	2022	—	—	—	Desi Crew	Jalwa
"Munde Pinda De"	2022	—	—	—	The Kidd	Jalwa
"Drunk Arjan"	2022	—	—	—	Jay B	Jalwa
"Maharani Jinda"	2022	—	—	—	Preet Hundal	Jalwa
"Trucker"	2022	—	—	—	Preet Hundal	Non-album single
"Milde"	2022	—	—	—	Mxrci	A for Arjan
"Please"	2022	—	—	—	Mxrci	A for Arjan
"More Beautiful"	2022	—	—	—	Mxrci	A for Arjan
"Heer"	2022	—	—	—	Mxrci	A for Arjan
"Salute"	2023	—	40	—	Mxrci	
"Old Me"	2023	—	—	—	Mxrci	
"65 Inch Ghodian"	2023	—	—	—	Mxrci	
"Night Out"	2023	—	—	—	Mxrci	
"Raah Warga"	2023	—	—	—	Jay B Singh	
"Munda Nahi Bolda"	2023	—	—	—	Mxrci	
"Panjab Intro – Saroor"	2023	—	—	—	Mxrci	Saroor
"Ilzaam"	2023	—	26	—	Mxrci	Saroor
"Long Back"	2023	—	—	—	Mxrci	Saroor
"Worldwide"	2023	—	—	—	Mxrci	Saroor
"Jaan Vaariye"	2023	—	—	—	The Kidd	Saroor
"Same Like Me"	2023	—	—	—	Mxrci	
"Lip Shade"	2023	—	—	—	Mxrci	
"Custom Plates" (with Mxrci)	2023	—	—	—	Mxrci	Mxrci Season
"Flat"	2023	—	—	—	Yeah Proof	
"Ghar Bharte"	2023	—	—	—	Mxrci	
"No Debts"	2023	—	—	—	Mxrci	
"Chah Pindan Di"	2023	—	—	—	Mxrci	
"Glorious"	2024	—	39	—	Mxrci	Chobar
"Suits You"	2024	—	—	—	Mxrci	Chobar
"Hot Shit"	2024	—	32	—	Mxrci	Chobar
"Kuz Saal"	2024	—	—	—	Mxrci	Chobar
"Fly" (with Mxrci)	2024	—	—	—	Mxrci	Manifest
"Chidi Udd" (with Mxrci)	2024	—	—	—	Mxrci	
"Je Jatt Vigad Geya"	2024	—	—	—	Mxrci	
"Air Hostess"	2024	—	—	—	Mxrci	
"Ok Hoye Paye Haan"	2025	—	—	—	Mxrci	
"Smooth"	2025	—	—	—	Mxrci	Badnaam
"Gears"	2025	—	—	—	Mxrci	The Revolution
"Jindey"	2025	—	—	—	Mxrci	
"Kikran De Phull"	2025	—	—	—	Mxrci	
"Pyar Diyaan Gallan"	2025	—	—	—	Mxrci	
"Ki Kariye"	2025	—	—	—	Mxrci	A for Arjan 2
"Kavita"	2025	—	—	—		Shikhar
"Bulle"	2025	—	—	—	Mxrci	Non-album singles
"Kahli Aa"	2025	—	—	—	Mxrci	Non-album singles
"Said & Done"	2026	54	—	—		Non-album singles

=== As featured artist ===
Song	Year	Peak chart position	Music producer	Album
Song	Year	UK Asian	Music producer	Album
"Koke" (Shipra Goyal featuring Arjan dhillon)	2021	—	Dr. Zeus	
"Ki Karde Je" (Nimrat Khaira feat. Arjan Dhillon)	2022	36	Desi Crew	Nimmo
"Chill Mode" (Gagan Kokri feat. Arjan Dhillon)	2022	—	Mxrci	Coz of God

*Arjan also credited as songwriter for lead artist

== Other charted songs ==
List of other charted songs, showing year released and album name
Title	Year	Peak chart positions	Album
Title	Year	NZ Hot	Album
"Greatest"	2024	21	Patander
"Paparazzi"	2024	29	Patander
"Never Ever"	2024	33	Patander
"Big Flex"	2024	24	Patander
"Brats"	2024	25	Patander

== Soundtrack contributions ==
Film	Year	Title	Music	Label
Afsar	2018	Ishq Jeha Ho Gya	Preet Hundal	White Hill Music
Badnaam	2025	Smooth	Mxrci	Flow Fire

== Songwriting discography ==
As lyricist (songwriter)
Song	Year	Artist(s)	Music producer	Album
"Suit"	2017	Nimrat Khaira	Preet Hundal	
"Sun Sohniye"	2018	Ranjit Bawa & Nimrat Kaira	Jaidev Kumar	Afsar soundtrack
"Udhar Chalda"	2018	Gurnam Bhullar & Nimrat Khaira	Preet Hundal	Afsar soundtrack
"Khat"	2018	Nimrat Khaira	Preet Hundal	Afsar soundtrack
"Ravaya Na Kar"	2018	Nimrat Khaira	Preet Hundal	Afsar soundtrack
"Ranihaar"	2018	Nimrat Khaira	Preet Hundal	
"Muchh"	2018	Nishawn Bhullar	Deep Jandu	
"Tohar"	2019	Nimrat Khaira	Preet Hundal	
"Lehnga"	2019	Nimrat Khaira	The Kidd	
"Pind Puchdi"	2019	Hustinder	Inder Dhumman	
"Luna"	2021	Diljit Dosanjh	Intense	Moon Child Era
"What Ve"	2021	Diljit Dosanjh & Nimrat Khaira	Desi Crew	
"Challa"	2022	Nimrat Khaira	Desi Crew	Nimmo
"Jhanjhar"	2022	Nimrat Khaira	Yeah Proof	Nimmo
"Sheesha"	2022	Nimrat Khaira	Yeah Proof	Nimmo
"Chunni Lot"	2022	Nimrat Khaira	Yeah Proof	Nimmo
"Handsome"	2022	Nimrat Khaira	J Statik	Nimmo
"Boliyan"	2022	Nimrat Khaira	Desi Crew	Nimmo
"Hullare"	2022	G Khan	Proof	6G (EP)
