= Sara Gurpal =

Indian actress and model

- Born: Haryana, India
- Occupations: Actress; Model; Singer
- Years active: 2012–present

Sara Gurpal is an Indian actress and model who predominantly works in Punjabi films. She is best known for her films like Manje Bistre, Shava Ni Girdhari Lal and Danger Doctor Jelly. She participated in the reality show Bigg Boss 14. She was nominated for Best Actor in Supporting Role in Filmfare Awards.

== Biography ==
Sara is from Haryana, India. She has done fashion designing from Chandigarh.

Gurpal started her career as a model in 2013 with the song Jean by Ranjit Bawa. She has been featured as a lead model in various music videos but her top collaborations are Me and my Girlfriend with Sidhu Moose Wala, Gunday No. 1 with Dilpreet Dhillon, Ehna Chauni with Jassie Gill, Jaguar with Bohemia, Vailpuna by Gippy Grewal and Dil with Ninja. In 2012, she won the Miss Chandigarh title.

She made her acting debut with the film Manje Bistre in 2017. In the same year she acted in the film Danger Doctor Jelly. In 2019 she played as a lead in the film Gurmukh – The Eyewitness. In 2020, Gurpal entered the Bigg Boss Season 14 house as a contestant. She acted in Shava Ni Girdhari Lal in 2021 and in Yaar Mera Titliaan Warga in 2022. She played the key role in the film Ghoda Dhai Kadam in 2023.

Sara made her singing debut with the song Slow Motion. She also sung songs like Lagdi Att and Ki Main Kalli Aa.

== Filmography ==
=== Films ===
Key
†	Denotes films that have not yet been released

Year	Title	Role(s)	Notes	Ref.
2017	Manje Bistre	Bholi		
2017	Dangar Docter Jelly	Naina		
2021	Shava Ni Girdhari Lal	Simran		
2022	Yaar Mera Titliaan Warga	Simmo		
2022	Hun Tan Bhog Hi Painge	Roop		
2023	Ghoda Dhai Kadam	Aman		
2023	Mining – Rette Te Kabza		with Singga	
2024	Lambran Da Laana			
2025	Gurmukh: The Eyewitness	Seerat		

=== Television ===
Year	Film	Role	Notes
2020	Bigg Boss 14	Contestant	Evicted day 14
2025	Reality Ranis Of The Jungle 2	Contestant	Runner-up
2026	Rise and Fall 2	Contestant	13th place

=== Music videos ===
- Me and my Girlfriend by Sidhu Moose Wala
- Gunday No. 1 by Dilpreet Dhillon
- Gunday Returns by Dilpreet Dhillon
- Rangle Dupatte by Dilpreet Dhillon
- Ehna Chauni by Jassie Gill
- Viah by Jassie Gill
- Jaguar by Bohemia
- Vailpuna by Gippy Grewal
- Dil by Ninja
- Jaan by Happy Raikoti
- Jhooth by Afsana Khan
- Surma by Karan Randhawa
- Jatt Te Jawani by Dilpreet Dhillon
- Sanawar by Dilpreet Dhillon
- Yaari by Maninder Buttar
- Prahune by Prem Dhillon
- Munda Bhal Di by Sharry Mann
- Jeen by Ranjit Bawa
- Parahune by Prem Dhillon and Amrit Maan
- Beautiful by Akhil
- Tabaah by Gurnazar ft Khan Saab
- Kamla by Rajvir Jawanda
- Raat Gayi Baat Gayi by Happy Raikoti ft Afsana Khan
- Koi Hor by Dilnoor Ft. Afsana & B Praak
- Baazi Dil Di by Himmat Sandhu
- Bombshell by Karan Sehmbi
- Tere Pind by Resham Singh Anmol
- Dreams by Akaal
- Tutte Dil by Armaan Bedil ft Raashi Sood
- Rabba ve by Armaan Bedil Ft. Dhanshri Dev
- Jatt te Jawani by Armaan Bedil
- Angelina by Amber Vashisht
- Note Muqabla by Goldy Desi Crew
- Hoor Mitra di by Jigar
- Baarishein by Harsh
- Dabangg Jatt by Ranbir Grewal
- Jaane Meriye by Gavy Hundal
- Pranda by Simranjeet Singh
- Vibe by Preetinder
- Keh Do by Marshal Sehgal
- That's it by Vicky
- O Sanam by Akhil Sachdeva
- Horna nu by Pearl V Puri
- Oh Bhayia – Bhai Dooj by Swasti Mehul
- Shayar by Nirmaan
- Simple Suit by Amrit Singh

=== Discography ===
- Slow Motion
- Lagdi Att
- Ki Main Kalli Aa
- Jutti
- Secret Yaari
- Desi Katta
- Kudiyan – 1 Min Music
- Nachne Nu Jee Krda
- Ride Featuring Dilpreet Dhillon
- Tu Chahida Featuring Arman Bedil
- Sandal Featuring Harshit Tomar
- Waliyan
- Hora nu
- Sexy
- Dil Tera
- Ok Bye
