= 47th Sports Emmy Awards =

2025 sports television award ceremony

- Date: May 26, 2026
- Location: Jazz at Lincoln Center's Frederick P. Rose Hall, New York City
- Hosted by: Roy Wood Jr.

The 47th Sports Emmy Awards were presented by the National Academy of Television Arts and Sciences (NATAS), honoring the best in American sports television coverage in 2025. The ceremony took place in-person at the Jazz at Lincoln Center's Frederick P. Rose Hall in New York City on May 26, 2026. As he did the previous year, comedian, writer, and producer Roy Wood Jr. hosted the ceremony.

== Winners and nominees ==
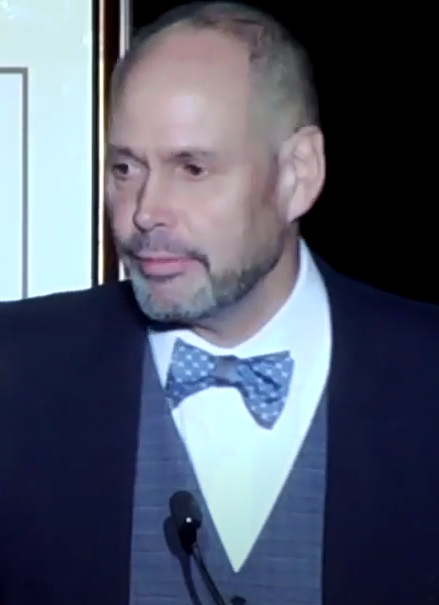
Ernie Johnson Jr., Outstanding Sports Personality: Studio Host winner

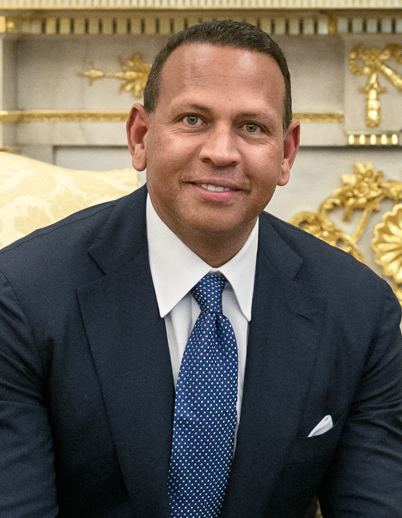
Alex Rodriguez, Outstanding Sports Personality: Studio Analyst winner

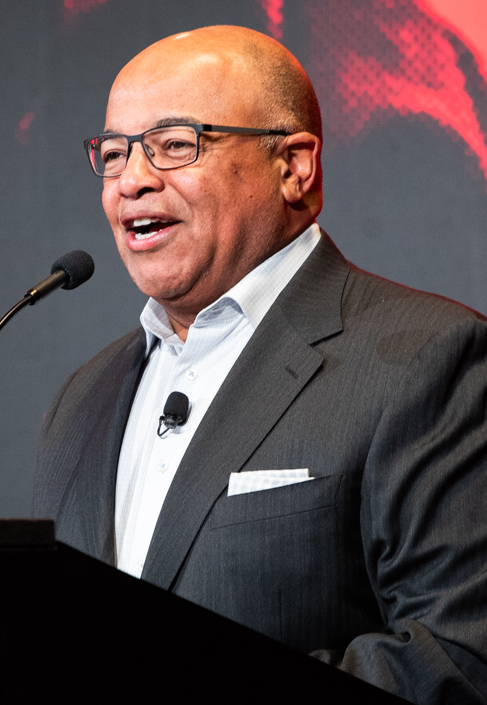
Mike Tirico, Outstanding Sports Personality: Play-By-Play winner

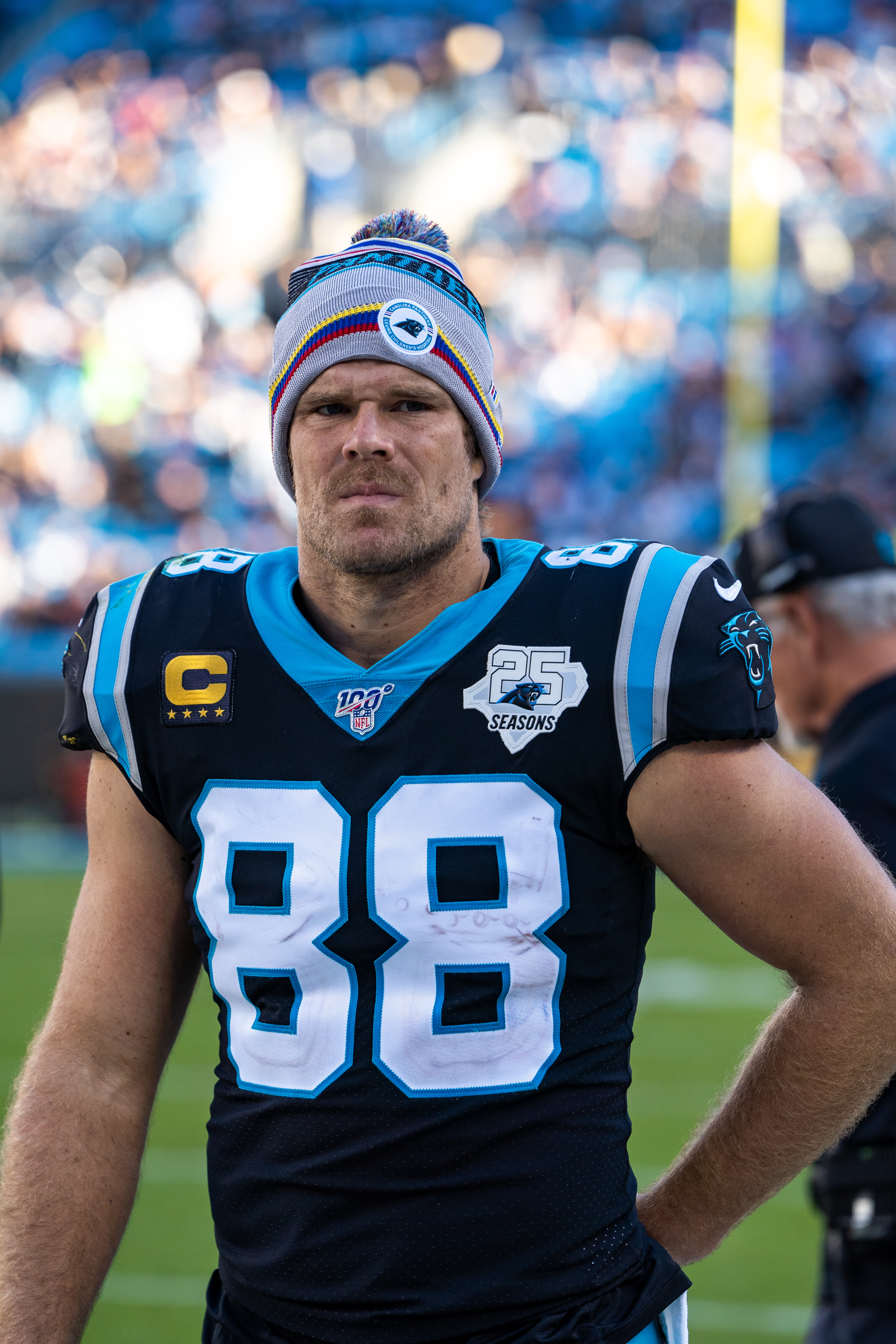
Greg Olsen, Outstanding Sports Personality: Event Analyst winner

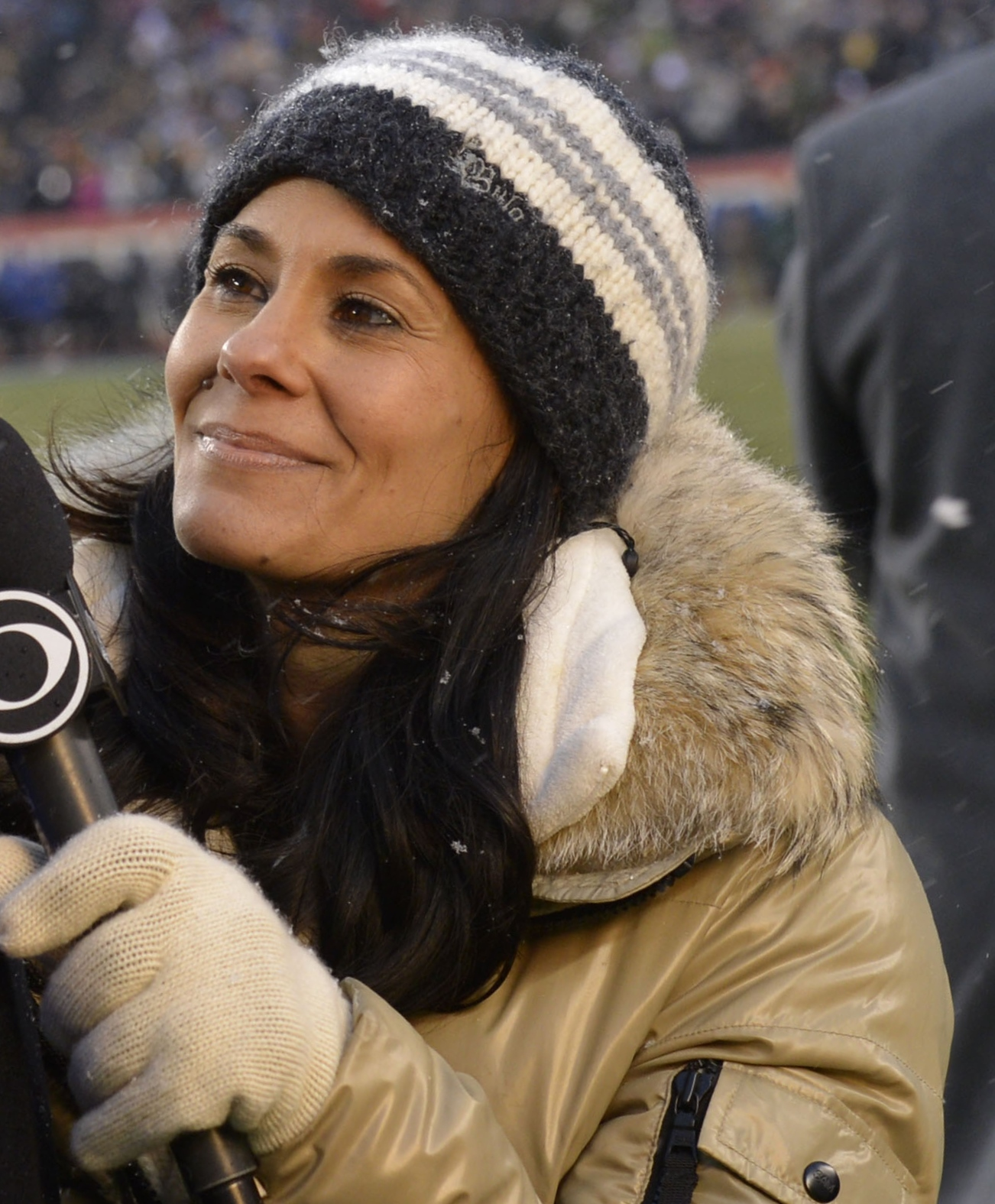
Tracy Wolfson, Outstanding Sports Personality: Sideline Reporter winner

The nominations were announced on March 25, 2026. The eligibility window for the nominations was the 2025 calendar year. Across the 47 categories, ESPN had the most nominations, with 63. Winners were announced on May 26, and are listed in bold.

=== Lifetime Achievement Award ===
On April 21, 2026, Steve Bornstein, former president and CEO of NFL Network, was announced as the recipient of the Lifetime Achievement Award.

=== Programming ===
Outstanding Live Sports Special: Championship Event	Outstanding Live Sports Special: Non-Championship Event
**Fox MLB: World Series – Toronto Blue Jays vs Los Angeles Dodgers (Fox)**; College Football Playoff: National Championship (ESPN); The Masters (CBS); NBA Finals (ESPN); Super Bowl LX (NBC / Peacock)	**Fox MLB: "The 95th All-Star Game" (Fox)**; 151st Kentucky Derby (NBC / Peacock); Monsters Funday Football (ESPN − Beyond Sports / Pixar / NFL); NHL in ASL: "2025 Navy Federal Credit Union NHL Stadium Series" (NHL Productions); NHL on ESPN: "4 Nations Face-Off" (ESPN)
Outstanding Live Sports Series	Outstanding Sports Playoff Coverage
**Sunday Night Football (NBC / Peacock)**; Fox NFL (Fox); Monday Night Football (ESPN / ABC); Monday Night Football with Peyton & Eli (ESPN); Thursday Night Football (Prime Video)	**Fox MLB: The American League Playoffs (Fox / FS1)**; College Football Playoff (ESPN); Fox NFL: The NFC Playoffs (Fox); NBC NFL Playoffs (NBC / Peacock); NCAA Men's Basketball Tournament (CBS / TNT)
Outstanding Edited Sports Event Coverage	Outstanding Edited Sports Special
**4 Nations Face-Off: Unveiled (NHL Productions)**; NFL Game Day All Access: "Super Bowl LX" (YouTube); Official Film of the 2025 Masters (CBS); Road to the Super Bowl (NBC); UFC The Walk: "Topuria vs Oliveria" (UFC)	**Not So Fast, My Friend: A Lee Corso Special (ESPN)**; E:60: "Paid to Play – Understanding College Sports in 2025" (ESPN); The Hall of Fame Knocks Class of 2026 (NFL Network); The Madhouse – NASCAR's Return Into Bowman Gray Stadium (FS1); Welcome to the NHL: "Meet the Prospects" (NHL Productions)
Outstanding Edited Sports Series: Hosted	Outstanding ESports Championship Coverage
**E60 (ESPN)**; Eli Manning Presents: The Undercovers: "Baker Mayfield", "Justin Jefferson", "Micah Parsons" (Prime Video); NFL Films Presents (FS1); Pablo Torre Finds Out (Meadowlark Media); TNT Sports Conversations (TruTV)	**2025 Call of Duty League Championship Weekend: "OpTic Texas vs Vancouver Surge" (ESL FACEIT Group)**; 2025 Apex Legends Global Series Championship (ESL FACEIT Group); League of Legends Worlds 2025 Final: "T1 Esports vs KT Rolster" (LoL Esports); VALORANT Champions 2025 Grand Final: "NRG vs Fnatic" (Valorant Esports)
Outstanding Sports Documentary: Short	Outstanding Sports Documentary: Long
**Final Finishers (East 89th St Productions)**; Home Turn (NASCAR Productions); NFL Explained: "Kendrick Lamar's Super Bowl LIX Halftime Show" (NFL Media Group); NFL Films Presents: "The Arctic Challenge" (FS1); The Shuffle (HBO Max)	**Champions of the Golden Valley (Olympics.com)**; Butterfly in a Blizzard (Bracing for Impact); Clemente (The History Channel); E:60: "Southpaw – The Life and Legacy of Jim Abbott" (ESPN); Elway (Netflix); Surviving Ohio State (HBO Max)
Outstanding Sports Documentary Series	Outstanding Sports Documentary Series: Serialized
**Cocaine Quarterback: Signal-Caller for the Cartel (Prime Video)**; Alex vs ARod (HBO Max); Allen Iv3rson (Prime Video); America's Team: The Gambler and His Cowboys (Netflix); Believers: Boston Red Sox (ESPN)	**Quarterback (Netflix)**; Built in Birmingham: Brady & the Blues (Religion of Sports); The Clubhouse: A Year with the Red Sox (Netflix); Formula 1: Drive to Survive (Netflix); Full Court Press (ESPN); WWE: Unreal (Netflix)
Outstanding Sports Studio Show: Daily	Outstanding Sports Studio Show: Weekly
**NFL Live (ESPN)**; First Things First (FS1); NBA Today (ESPN); The Pat McAfee Show (ESPN); SportsCenter (ESPN)	**College GameDay (ESPN)**; Inside the NBA on TNT (TNT); Monday Night Countdown (ESPN); The NFL Today (CBS); Thursday Night Football (Prime Video)
Outstanding Sports Studio Show: Limited Run	Outstanding Sports Journalism
**Road to the Final Four (CBS / TNT)**; College GameDay: "College Football Playoff" (ESPN); Football Night in America: NFL Postseason (NBC / Peacock); Fox MLB: The Postseason (Fox / FS1); Inside the NBA Playoffs on TNT (TNT)	**E:60: "Save: The Katie Meyer Story" (ESPN)**; Pablo Torre Finds Out: "Aspiration" (Meadowlark Media); Kobe: The Making of a Legend (CNN Originals); Pablo Torre Finds Out: "What Is Riley Gaines Hiding?" (Meadowlark Media)
Outstanding Sports Feature: Short Form	Outstanding Sports Feature: Long Form
**NCAA March Madness: "Behan Strong" (CBS)**; Fox CFB: Big Noon Kickoff: "All Heart" (Fox); World Figure Skating Championships: "Faces Forever Young" (NBC / Peacock); Fox CFB: Big Noon Kickoff: "Just Getting Started" (Fox); College GameDay: "Luckie" (ESPN); Fox MLB: The Postseason: "RJ" (Fox); College GameDay: "A World Away" (ESPN)	**NFL Films Presents: "Tim Green – A Voice Reclaimed" (FS1)**; Chuskit & Saldon: Frozen Dreams of Ladakh (Olympics.com); Girl Climber (Red Bull Studios); Imillaskate: The Cholita Skaters of Bolivia (Optimist); Golf Central Live from The Open: "Ride With Me" (Golf Channel); SportsCenter: "SC Featured: Love, Abby" (ESPN)
Outstanding Sports Open/Tease	Outstanding Interactive Experience: Sports
**America's Team: The Gambler and His Cowboys (Netflix)**; Super Bowl LX: "America's Game" (NBC / Peacock); Fox IndyCar: The 109th Indianapolis 500: "Brick by Brick" (Fox); Celtics City (HBO Max); The 126th Army-Navy Game: "The Harder Choice" (CBS); The Masters: "Nerves at Augusta National" (CBS)	**Prime Video Sports: "Fan Optionality on Prime Video" (Prime Video)**; NASCAR Driver Cam on HBO Max (HBO Max); The NBA Experience on Peacock (Peacock); NHL in ASL (NHL Productions); SportsCenter for You (ESPN)
Outstanding Digital Innovation: Sports	Outstanding Promotional Announcement: Sports
**World of Red Bull in Apple Immersive (Red Bull Media House)**; MLB App in XR (MLB); NFL on NBC: "Madden NFL Cast" (Peacock); Prime Insights (Prime Video); VIP — Yankee Stadium (Apple TV)	**NBA Finals: "Unforgettable Awaits" (NBC Entertainment)**; City of Fury: "Fatal Fury in Times Square" (BigTime Creative Shop); ESPN Sports Forever (ESPN / ESPN+); Fox IndyCar: "Fastest Racing on Earth" (Fox / FS1 / FS2 / Fox News / Fox Business / BTN / Deportes); Milan-Cortina Olympics on NBC & Peacock (NBC / Peacock); NBA on NBC & Peacock (NBC / Peacock)
Outstanding Public Service Content: Sports	Outstanding Sports Studio Show in Spanish
**Super Bowl LX: "Champion" (NFL / 72andSunny)**; ESPN Take Back Sports Movement (ESPN); Line 'Em Up (JOAN Creative); Notre Dame: What Would You Fight For? (NBC / Peacock)	**ESPN FC** (ESPN); Ahora o Nunca (ESPN); Fútbol Picante (ESPN); Linea de 4 (Univision / TUDN); Premier League Extra (Telemundo / Universo / Peacock); Rumbo al Mundial (Telemundo / Universo / Peacock)
Outstanding Sports Feature Story in Spanish
**Mundo Originals: "Los Colores del Istmo" (Mundo NFL)**; Mundo Originals: "Atxa Delgado" (Mundo NFL); Greenland: Venezia (ESPN); María Llena Eres de Fuerza (ESPN); SportsCenter: "SC Reportajes: Rafael Campos" (ESPN)

=== Personality ===
Outstanding Sports Personality: Studio Host	Outstanding Sports Personality: Studio Analyst
**Ernie Johnson** (TNT / CBS); Rece Davis (ESPN); Rich Eisen (NFL Network); Laura Rutledge (ESPN); Kate Scott (CBS / Paramount+); Scott Van Pelt (ESPN)	**Alex Rodriguez** (Fox / FS1); Charles Barkley (TNT); Clark Kellogg (CBS / TNT); Mina Kimes (ESPN); Pedro Martinez (TNT); Candace Parker (TNT / TBS)
Outstanding Sports Personality: Play-By-Play	Outstanding Sports Personality: Event Analyst
**Mike Tirico** (NBC / Peacock); Joe Buck (ESPN); Joe Davis (Fox / FS1 / NFL Network); Ian Eagle (CBS / TNT / Netflix / Amazon); Jim Nantz (CBS)	**Greg Olsen** (Fox / NFL Network); Troy Aikman (ESPN); Tom Brady (Fox); Cris Collinsworth (NBC / Peacock); Bill Raftery (CBS / TNT / Fox)
Outstanding Sports Personality: Sideline Reporter	Outstanding Sports Personality: Emerging On-Air Talent
**Tracy Wolfson** (CBS / TNT); Tom Rinaldi (Fox | FS1); Holly Rowe (ESPN); Laura Rutledge (ESPN); Lisa Salters (ESPN)	**Katie George** (ESPN); Andraya Carter (ESPN); Jason Kelce (ESPN); Matt Ryan (CBS / Paramount+ / Netflix); Richard Sherman (Prime Video); J.J. Watt (CBS)
Outstanding Sports On-Air Personality In Spanish
**Miguel Gurwitz** (Telemundo / Universo / Peacock); Andrés Cantor (Telemundo / Universo / Peacock); Carolina Guillén (ESPN); Fernando Palomo (ESPN); Sammy Sadovnik (MLS Productions)

=== Technical ===
Outstanding Technical Team: Sports Event	Outstanding Technical Team: Sports Studio
**Fox MLB: World Series – Toronto Blue Jays vs Los Angeles Dodgers (Fox / FS1)**; College Football Playoff: National Championship (ESPN); Fox IndyCar: The 109th Indianapolis 500 (Fox / FS1); The Masters (CBS); Super Bowl LX (NBC / Peacock)	**NBA on Prime Video (Amazon MGM Studios)**; College GameDay: "College Football" (ESPN); Fox NFL (Fox); NFL Draft (ESPN)
Outstanding Sports Camera Work: Short Form	Outstanding Sports Camera Work: Long Form
**The 126th Army-Navy Game: "The Harder Choice" – Oliver Anderson, Curran Ferrey, and Thom McCallum (CBS)**; Fox IndyCar: The 109th Indianapolis 500: "Brick by Brick" – Brian Alexander, Joe Bearese, Ari Moore, and Chase Ellison (Fox); 151st Kentucky Derby – Eric Girgash, Aaron Mendez, and Taylor Morrison (NBC / Peacock); Roland-Garros on TNT Sports: "A Parisian Rhythm with Omar Sy" – Zeus Morand, Jay Christensen, Chris Cunningham, Owen Hofman, Peter Jablonowski, Jimmy Kniest, Thomas Poecksteiner, Lorenz Pritz, Jimmy Kniest, Thomas Poecksteiner, and Lorenz Pritz (TNT / TruTV); NFL Films Presents: "Silent Super Bowl" – Steve Andrich, Jim Barry, Lucien Chan, Hannah Epstein, Tony Erickson, Phil Gushue, John Joseph Harris, Ben Johnson, Dave Malek, Matthew Maniego, DJ McDonduit, Jeremy Nieves, Colby Oliver, Austin Porter, Dom Satterberg, and Chad Schwartzenberger (FS1)	**I Skied Down Mount Everest – Michał Pukowiec, Andrzej Bargiel, Bartłomiej Bargiel, Aleksandr Groman-Hayes, Pasang Rinzee Sherpa, Maciej Sulima, Manish Tamang–Pakhrin, and Dariusz Załuski (Red Bull Media House)**; America's Team: The Gambler and His Cowboys – David Bolen, Adam Uhl, Baxter Bailey, and Jordan Scott (Netflix); Celtics City – Thom Stukas, Jon Roche, Joshua Smith, Andrés Vasquez, Michael Winik, Peter Winik, Oliver Anderson, Nicholas Galante, Jamar Jones, John Tipton, and Richard Twomey (HBO Max); Cocaine Quarterback: Signal-Caller for the Cartel – Jeff Dolen and Gabriel Patay (Unrealistic Ideas); Raise The Flags: 50 Years of Buccaneers Football – Dakota Diel, Eric Wiese, Kerry Buck, Jeff Cook, Stephen Lynch, Al Marinelli, Addison Neville, Wes Pratt, and Matt Wightman (Heroes & Fables); Hard Knocks: "Training Camp with the Buffalo Bills" – Hannah Epstein, Kevin Simkins, Steve Andrich, Jim Barry, Matt Engel, Andres Garcia, Devin Goundry, Ali Ivosevich, Denard Le'Noir, Pat Maher, Dave Malek, Jamie McPherson, Andre Messina, Sam Jeremy Nieves, Stephen Phillips, Austin Porter, Chad Schwartzenberger, Evan Shaw, Shawn Shore, Nick Straus, Will Taylor, Neal Ten Eyck, and Justin Uchendu (HBO Max)
Outstanding Sports Editing: Short Form	Outstanding Sports Editing: Long Form
**NHL on ESPN: "4 Nations Face-Off: For Crest and Country" – Jon Bartel, Mike Farrell, and Andy Sharp (ESPN)**; NBA All-Star on TNT: "The Bay" – Alex Bailey, Vickie Connolly, Matt Gaynes, Peter JablonowskI, Thomas Poecksteiner, and Lorenz Pritz (TNT); Fox IndyCar: The 109th Indianapolis 500: "Brick by Brick" – Ryan Little (Fox); NHL Stanley Cup Final on TNT: "It's Time" – Matt Gaynes (TNT); Roland-Garros on TNT Sports: "A Parisian Rhythm with Omar Sy" – Peter JablonowskI, Mark Jackson, Thomas Poecksteiner, and Lorenz Pritz (TNT / truTV); NHL on ESPN: "Stanley Cup Playoffs Opening Round: Devils vs Hurricanes" – Cathy Honeywell (ESPN)	**Celtics City – Eric Barchie, Malcolm Hearn, Eric Janssen, Matt McCormick, and Matthew Prinzing (HBO Max)**; American Thunder: NASCAR at Le Mans – Matt Dunkin, Ryan Hensley, Sol Horner, Jon Housholder, Jeramie Ryan, Jeff Schafer, John Schroter, and David Stiles (NASCAR Studios); America's Team: The Gambler and His Cowboys – Alex Amoling, Michael Anthony Brown, Chris Dallas-Feeney, Frank Gaye, Dillon Hayes, Brian Kelly, Travis Rush, Robert Ryang, David Tillman, and Evan Vetter (Netflix); Butterfly in a Blizzard – Cody Carter and Rose Corr (Bracing for Impact); Saquon – Shannon Furman, Julia Harmon Dissinger, Lois Nam, Alexander Pappas, Micaela Powers, Adam Ryan, James Weiner, and Angela Zender (NFL Films); We Beat the Dream Team – Ken Mowe and Scott Ohash (TNT / HBO Max); WWE: Unreal – Mark Christy, Andrew Cordova, Tre'Vonn Davis, Mike Drozd, Garrett Fittizzi, Bill Garvey, Jeff Hillegass, Michael LaVancher, Dave Neupauer, Erik Powers, Eric Reed, Ty Schadt, Brian Wadsworth, Chris Weaver, and Jason Weber (Netflix)
The Dick Schaap Outstanding Sports Writing Award: Short Form	Outstanding Sports Writing: Long Form
**Wimbledon – Jeffrey Sarokin (ESPN)**; Fox IndyCar: The 109th Indianapolis 500: "Brick by Brick" – Paul Kennedy, PT Navarro, and Jesse Weiss (Fox); College GameDay: "Choices - Lee Corso's Final Headgear Pick" – Mike Farrell and John N. Minton III (ESPN); NHL Stanley Cup Final on TNT: "It's Time" – Aaron Cohen and Tyler Lassiter (TNT); 151st Kentucky Derby – Aaron Cohen (NBC / Peacock); Fox IndyCar: The 109th Indianapolis 500: "In Motion and Memory" – Tom Rinaldi (Fox)	**Hard Knocks: "In Season with the NFC East" – Gerry Reimel (HBO Max)**; E:60: "Above the Tide: 20 Years After Katrina" – Ryan Clark, Julian Gooden, and Phil Guidry (ESPN); Celtics City – Eric Barchie, Sascha Gardner, Malcolm Hearn, Gabe Honig, Eric Janssen, Christina Lenis, Matthew Prinzing, and Lauren Stowell (HBO Max); Going Inside – Drew Watkins (TNT); NFL Films Presents: "The Superdome at 50" – Todd Schmidt (FS1)
Outstanding Music Direction: Sports	Outstanding Sports Audio/Sound: Live Event
**Home Turn: "Daytona Beach, FL" – Jay Busbee, Tim Clark, John Dahl, John T. Edge, Tally Hair, Hillary Horgan, Annie B. Hayes, Timothy Horgan, Aliana Marinos, Dave Lynch, and Tim Spero (NASCAR Studios)**; Hard Knocks: "In Season with the NFC East" – Jeff Cameron, Julia Harmon, Emily Leitner Cameron, Nick Mascolo, Lois Nam, Dave Neupauer, Kobi Theiler, Jason Weber, Christine Black-Reimel, David Robidoux, Ryan Scully, Jesse Legrazie, Tom McWilliams, and Steve Moseley (HBO Max); Memphis to the Mountain: "Acclimatization" / "Elevation" – Bleu and Ryan Perez-Daple (Andscape / ESPN); NCAA Final Four: "San Antonio: Unwritten Reimagined" – Alanna Campbell, Taylor Ralph, Danielle Brisebois, Paul "knownwolf" Ottinger, Wayne Rodruiges, Natasha Bedingfield, and Vin Accardi (CBS); NHL Stanley Cup Final on TNT: "It's Time" – Russell Emmanuel, Tyler Lassiter, Thom Lukas, and Matt Gaynes (TNT); Surviving Ohio State – Thomas Edward Rouch, Cornel Thomas Wilczek, and Luna Yue Pan (HBO Max); Thursday Night Football – Sean Simmons, Jenson David Aubrey Vauhan, Sean Cook, Zack Hall, John-Emil Johansson, Whit Kane, Collins Obinna Chibueze, Kevin Joseph Powers, and Raul Lopez (Amazon MGM Studios)	**Fox MLB – Mark Antcliffe, Paul Bouzar, Joseph M. Carpenter, Michael Del Tufo, Dave Free, Joel Groeblinghoff, Matt Huff, Michael Mason, Loren Sherman, Erik West, Brad Zeiment, Don Adam, Rod Barton, Jeffrey Barwise, Ken Cardosa, Henry Cohen, Bobby Diaz, Robbie Feasel, Frederick Ferris, Dave Hamann, Andy Herbein, Justin Herminghouse, Paul Kelley, Jason Knapp, Francisco Koch, Leonard Lee, Anthony LoMastro, Marc Majerus, Greg Pavis, Wes Pelland, Scott Perry, Michael Rew, Atiba Riley, Andy Rostron, Ryan Stotts, Andrew Woods, Christopher Workman, and John Zdon (Fox / FS1)**; Apple TV: Friday Night Baseball – Dan Cochran, Glenn Stilwell, Adam Clairmont, Tony Johnson, Garrett Knapp, and Jon Lukason (Apple TV); Fox NASCAR – Kevin McCloskey, Jeff Bratta, Jeff Feltz, Peter Girgenti, Barb Hanford, Craig Lenox, Anthony LoNastro, Dan Masters, Jamie McCombs, Steve Onuska, Harry Chip Weaver, and Doug Wilson (Fox / FS1); Fox NFL – Timothy Bischof, Douglas Deems, Timothy Dunn, Kevin McCloskey, James McCombs, Jr., Sean O'Gorman, Matthew Rossetti, Edward Verstraete, Ben Altopp, Robert Charlap, Michael Davis, George Denmark, Jonathan Lukason, Dan Masters, Richard Newstreet, Jr., John Warner, and Harry Weaver (Fox); Sunday Night Football – Wendel Stevens, Raymond Clark, Shane Denham, Mike Feldson, Ed Gaines, Dan Haggard, Eric Pfeiffer, Adam Rodenberg, Clark Stewart, and Andrea Sumner (NBC / Peacock)
Outstanding Sports Audio/Sound: Post-Produced	Outstanding Sports Graphic Design: Event/Show
**Hard Knocks: "Training Camp with the Buffalo Bills" – Vince Caputo, Scott M. Carter, Eddie Sheridan, Ernie Fortunato, Josh Freyenberger, Jeremy Stirone, Jeff Cornell, Sean Derksen, Brandon Goodwin, Steven M. Guercio, Frank Hamilton, Sydnee Faith Johnson, Justin Junior, Mike Maksymowicz, Matt Mayer, Andrew Miller, Mark Ricci, Ryan Stridde, and Larry Williams Jr., Chris Benedict, Mike Kennedy, Steven Langenhorst, Katy Mindeman, Steve Moseley, Geoff Pawlikowski, Scott Perry, Paul Pizzica, Ron Schreier, and Gary Winger (HBO Max)**; Believers: Boston Red Sox – Steven Bonarrigo, Miles Fuqua, Roger Jacobson, Aaron LaChapelle, Detdrich McClure, John Mckallip, Jose Ochoa, Tanner Segbers, Cameron Tacey, Andy Yip, Tyler Proctor, and Josh Banach (ESPN); Cocaine Quarterback: Signal-Caller for the Cartel – Alex Altman, Alex Auvenshine, Jo Dutaillis, Aaron Lachapelle, Bartek Swiatek, Colin Moran, Jessie Brewer and Vanessa Flores (Unrealistic Ideas); E:60: "Above the Tide – 20 Years After Katrina" – David Jaunai (ESPN); Earnhardt: Dale – C Brandon Goodwin, Lawrence Everson, Derek McGinley, Tanya Orlov, and Justin Walker (Imagine Documentaries); NHL Stanley Cup Final on TNT: "It's Time" – Daniel Cahill (TNT)	**NBA on NBC & Peacock – Graphic Design Team (Note: Leandro Beltran, Daniel DeGloria, Micah Hahn, Aleksandra Liubas, Teresa Rofer, Alexander Suarez, Anthony Thiebaux, Kate Barbier, Stephen Belmont, Laurent Carcelle, Dylan Ferris, Chris Galo, Shawn Hendrickson, Benjamin Makovsky, Nicole Manning, Stephanie McAllister, Kevin Nunez, Jessika Pietryka, Susan Schultz, Denis Tskhadaia, Steven Vatter, Vincent Velez, Emma Wiatrzyk, Noah Woode, Raphael Vangelis, Jim Read, David Barton, Tripp Dixon, Wade Echer, Chad Hudson, Patrick Coffey, Joe Fuller, and Mary Anne Ledesma, Padraic Driscoll, David Melfi, Jelena Sibalija, and Shannon Moore) (NBC / Peacock)**; Fox NFL – Graphic Design Team (Note: Michael Adames, Taylor Beck, David Brown, Oscar Carrillo, Juan Cayamcela, Ethan Ching, Ethan Clark, Alessio Cossu, Kevin Creech, Worawut Deeudomchan, Francisco DelMar, Michael DiCola, Brian Do, Brian Do, Zac Fields, Hanna Frangiyyeh, Rita Franklin, Gabriel Galluccio, Noah Hammond, Mark Haubner, Bryan Hepperle, Mark Howell, Robert Howell, Gina Izerel, Helen Kim, Jimmy Kong, Muchin Kuo, Etienne Laneville, Jesse Larson, Cris Mapoy, John Martin, James McGillin, Mark Morales, Michael Ng, Michael Ng, Samuel Ochiuto, Milton Palomo, Edna Pena, Lauren Peterson, Jason Phipps, Bill Pinkel, Jeremy Puttkammer, James Reed, Jim Rodman, Geoff Romsa, Michael Schisler, Moe Seyedi, Eric Sherwood, Christoper Ian Smith, Danielle Stocki, Stephen Sukowaty, Hans Tjandra, Gary Hartley, and Chris Watson) (Fox); Monsters Funday Football – Graphic Design Team (Note: Isabel Bristol, Javier Castellanos, Scott Dickens, Jordan Greenstein, Michael Gallo, Erin Leslie, Mary Roa Pena, Marco Castellanos, Tess Glastra van Loon, David Sparrgrove, Thomas Breuker, Brian Cantore, Jennifer Dickie, Mike Fabris, Eric Freiler, Jorge Gonzalez, Richard Harrington, Adam Konyndyk, Kevin McCullough, Robert McNicholas, Colin Moore, Preyas Naik, Justin Norton, David Traylor, Jessica Yong, Stan Zutt, Daniel Baxter, Rebecca Boensch, Emily Brown, Alison Cellana, Eric Colson, Arik Ehle, Mathieu Einig, Amanda Enright, Michael Farrell, Paige Fitch, Maddie Goldberg, Tara Howard, Steven Jase, Michael Kataja, Solinda Keth, Julia Leonard, Patrick Leung, Luis Llanes, Amber Masarik, Melvin Royster, Ross Rubino, Yusuke Sato, Sue Shim, Roman Shtykov, Maria Tombazzi, Zachary Wilkinson, Carrie Brzezinski-Hsu, Jocelyne Meinert, Sander Schouten, Michael Szykowny, Tina Thornton, Jay Ward, Nicolaas Westerhof, Sarah Atwood, Michael Chiplock, Scott Lodge, Tysen Potter, Brian Tanaka, Matthew Tucker, Suman Vinasithamby, Joseph Durante, Umair Mohsin, Massud Sarahi, David Seo, Michael Visser, Catalina Hosokawa, Carl Peters, and Gabriel Potter) (ESPN); NBA on Prime Video – Graphic Design Team (Note: Trent Bailey, Alec Vitale, Robert Atkinson, Christian Cook, John Paul Diodati, Cole Holloway, Dillion King, Abby Ra, and Halle Watson, Marco Bacich, Matt Green, Brian Hwang, Daesun Hwang, Eduardo Slesaransky, Nick DiNapoli, Clay Lipsky, and Marc Mata, Garrett Cook, Spandan Daftary, Amina Hussein, Eric Mosley, Mike Muriano, Jared Stacy, Alex Strand, Erron Banks, Rohin Das, Andrew Greathouse, Travis Henderson, Gary Koopsen, Patrick Lee, Jeff Porper, Zach Sadler, Bettina Shore, Scott Swim, Grant Werle, Jeff Wilkov, Danielle Goodman, Diana Guardado, Jayme Hui, Patty Kiley, Christian Thompson, and Subhan Uddin) (Amazon MGM Studios − Amazon MGM Studios); Thursday Night Football – Graphic Design Team (Note: Kirsten Begg-Swider, Wade Echer, Scott Swim, Jesse Bafia, TJ Czupryna, Matt Epstein, Chris Jeffrey, Ryan Leimbach, Benjamin Makovsky, Stephanie McAllister, Juan Monasterio, Mosheer Nadar, Amjad Olabi, Joe Paccia, Jeff Porper, John Rizzo, Chris Salvador, Alex Smith, Drew Smoot, Noah Woode, Carlos Norero, Christian Arnsparger, Frederico Colombo Berra, Thiago Carniero, Leo Esteves, Fernanda Leal, Henrique Montanari, Giordano Prando, Izik Roitman, Mike Trinker, Josh Van Praag, Thomas Desmeules, Tripp Dixon, John Schleef, Jared Stacy, Spandan Daftary, Grant Lau, Tyler Leonard, Marc Mata, Mike Muriano, TJ Nuckolls, Alex Strand, Mark Teitelman, and Bo Savage) (Amazon MGM Studios − Amazon MGM Studios)
Outstanding Sports Graphic Design: Specialty	Outstanding Studio or Production Design/Art Direction: Sports
**Believers: Boston Red Sox – Jesse Bafia, Phil Hoeschen, Chelsea Marotta, Loren McNames, Amanda Li Jing Koh, and Lauren Fisher (ESPN)**; MLB Now Open – Brent Philhower, Marissa Lombardi, Kellie Sing, Eric Sole, David Wendl, Mark Capalbo, Brian Kenny, Premier Maldonado, Mike Martin, Marty Montalto, Jeff Boccia, and Danny Muhr (MLB Network); NFL on CBS: "The Evolution of the Big Head – Merging Human Artistry with AI Innovation" – Ade Ellis, Brian Maher, Charles Masiano, Jake Picker, Matthew Quartararo, Austin Smith, Brooke Weiss, Luke Desimone, Jordan Lange, Jose Leon, Komal Bhukhanwala, Jon Paul LoMonaco, Douglas Gordon, Hasani Jones, Ian McCarthy, Kenji Nakajima, Yash Patel, Andrew Sherman, and Robyn Whaples (CBS); NFL Slimetime – Sol Bourdeau-Garcia, Michael Cerullo, Nelson Dellamaggiore, Jonathan Katz, Will Velasquez, Jennifer Chiu, Alessandra Sutera, Kerry Villamil, Gbenga Adewumi, Dave O'Brien, Jeff Wallenhorst, Jennifer Clotfelter, Caleb Eason, Scott Kennell, Kristie Kish, Aaron Kite, Brittany Laureano, Chris Timmons, Matt Whitman, and Tim Lines (Nickelodeon); WWE: Unreal – Jim Eyles, Matthew Besson, June Cho, Andrew Cordova, Steven Do, Rich Hunt, Lucy Kim, Daniel Moreno, Michael Rinnan, Pete Sickbert-Bennett, Erik Powers, Chris Weaver, and Steve Biggert (Netflix)	**The NFL Today: "The Virtual Time Machine: Rebuilding the Legacy of The NFL Today" – Komal Bhukhanwala, Tyler Hale, Drew Kaliski, Jon Paul LoMonaco, Robert Matina, Ryan Brown, Dave Campbell, John Chiarelli, Selena Cohen, Luke Desimone, Michael Goitiandia, Douglas Gordon, Emilio Incerto, Hasani Jones, Tara Kafer, Alex Katz, Jordan Lange, Jose Leon, Taso Mastorakis, Ian McCarthy, Mike Meredith, Mike Migliaro, Kenji Nakajima, Rob Odorisio, Yash Patel, Peter Rizzo, Andrew Sherman, Craig Weiss, Robyn Whaples, Dan Clemens, Angelo Cole, Nick Esposito, Ashlyn Mocknis, Trevor Sheridan, and Terry Smith (CBS)**; Celtics City – Thom Stukas, Andrés Vasquez, and Tyus Tualii (HBO Max); Fox NFL Sunday: "Case of the Missing Best Team" / "The Dynasty Blueprint" / "The Waiting Room" – Dave Strumpf, Jesse Weiss, Ethan Clark, Josh Perea, Chris Smith, Jordan Dawes, Scott Freeman, Edwind Moreno, Hallie Gould, and Oscar Huezo (Fox); Monsters Funday Football – Carrie Brzezinski-Hsu, Jocelyne Meinert, Sander Schouten, David Sparrgrove, Michael Szykowny, Tina Thornton, Jay Ward, Nicolaas Westerhof, Sarah Atwood, Michael Chiplock, Scott Lodge, Tysen Potter, Brian Tanaka, Matthew Tucker, Suman Vinasithamby, Tess Glastra van Loon, Catalina Hosokawa, Adam Konyndyk, Umair Mohsin, Carl Peters, Massud Sarahi, and Michael Visser (ESPN); NBA on Prime Video – Andre Durette, Clay Lipsky, Marc Mata, Spandan Daftary, David Faller, Doss Freel, Ellerey Gave, Amina Hussein, Eric Mosley, Mike Muriano, Jared Stacy, Benjamin Thiem, O'Shea Johnson, Patrick Lee, Yoonju Lee, Sarah Lenker, Ashley North, Scott Swim, Dave Thibodeau, Mitsuka Thiem, Subhan Uddin, Grant Werle, Raeford Dwyer, Matt Jackson, Michael Kaplan, Brandon Lowe, Chris Maroney, Jasveer Sidhu, and Tyler Pickle (Amazon MGM Studios); NFL Slimetime – Justin Nardecchia, Theron Wineinger, Jessie Bonaventure, Connor O'Leary, Sean Haffey, Alisha Hallmark, Emily Mustillo, and Nicole Denise White (Nickelodeon)
The George Wensel Technical Achievement Award
**Fox MLB: The Postseason: "UmpCam AR Strike Zone System" – Kyle Burke, Simon Chattington, Brad Cheney, Michael Davies, Mark Elinson, James Japhet, John Rendall, Matthew Smith, James Thomas, and Ryan Zander (MLB / Major League Baseball)**; College Football: POVORA Wireless Tilt Control CapCam: "Stabilized CapCam with Remote Tilt Control" – Sam Challenger, Sam Fleet, Laurin Goller, Richie Hayes, Nathan Horrocks, David James, Bryan Jaroch, Philip Orlins, Matt Waddleton, and Mitchell Workman (ESPN); Fox IndyCar: "Augmented Reality" – Roderick Barrett, Michael Davies, Zac Fields, Gerard J. Hall, Jon Kaczmarski, Bevan Prophet, Andrew Smith, and Hans Weber (Fox / FS1); The Last Crescendo: "The 4th Judge: First-Ever AI Power Boxing Judge" – Fadi Abdeen, Rayyan Aoun, Bruno Freitas, Hazem Kamal, Paula Martínez, Saymon Medeiros, Douglas Oliveira, Mohamed Qarawi, Martin Rabaglia, and Mohammed Sehly (DAZN); TGL Presented by SoFi: "SmartPin Cam" – Scott Armstrong, Jonathan Dale, Colin DeFord, Johnathan Evans, Ashley Loyd, Andrew Macaulay, Mike McCarley, Michael McQuade, Jeff Neubarth, and Dale Szymborski (ABC / ESPN / ESPN2 / ESPN+); 2025 Wrangler National Finals Rodeo: "AIQ: Where Data Meets Dirt" – Allison Aycock, Jason Brooksby, Don Cardona, Milan Cooper, Dimitrios Lymperopoulos, Amani Navarrette, Ande Wall, Brian Whitman, and Jordan Yentzer (Cowboy+ / TWG AI)
