= 2026 Emmy Awards =

2026 Emmy Awards may refer to:

- 4th Children's and Family Emmy Awards, honoring children's and family-oriented television programming between June 2024 and May 2025, was held on March 1–2, 2026.
- 47th Sports Emmy Awards, honoring sports programming in 2025, was held on May 26, 2026.
- 47th News and Documentary Emmy Awards, honoring American news and documentary programming in 2025, was held on May 27–28, 2026.
- 78th Primetime Emmy Awards, honoring primetime programming between June 2025 and May 2026, held on September 14, 2026.
  - 78th Primetime Creative Arts Emmy Awards, the separate Primetime Emmys ceremony to honor artistic and technical achievements in primetime programming between June 2025 and May 2026, held on September 5–6, 2026.
- 53rd Daytime Emmy Awards, honoring daytime programming in 2025, held on October 30, 2026.
  - 53rd Daytime Creative Arts & Lifestyle Emmy Awards, the Daytime Emmy Award categories honoring artistic and technical achievements in daytime programming in 2025, were presented on the same night of October 30, 2026.
- 54th International Emmy Awards, honoring international programming in 2025, is planned to be held in November 23, 2026.

| Preceded by 2025 | Emmy Awards; 2026 | Succeeded by 2027 |
