= Jaggi Singh =

Jaggi Singh may refer to:

- Jaggi Singh (activist) (born 1971), Canadian anti-globalization and social justice activist
- Jaggi Singh (actor) (born 1989), Punjabi actor and film producer
