= Rahul Nath =

Actor

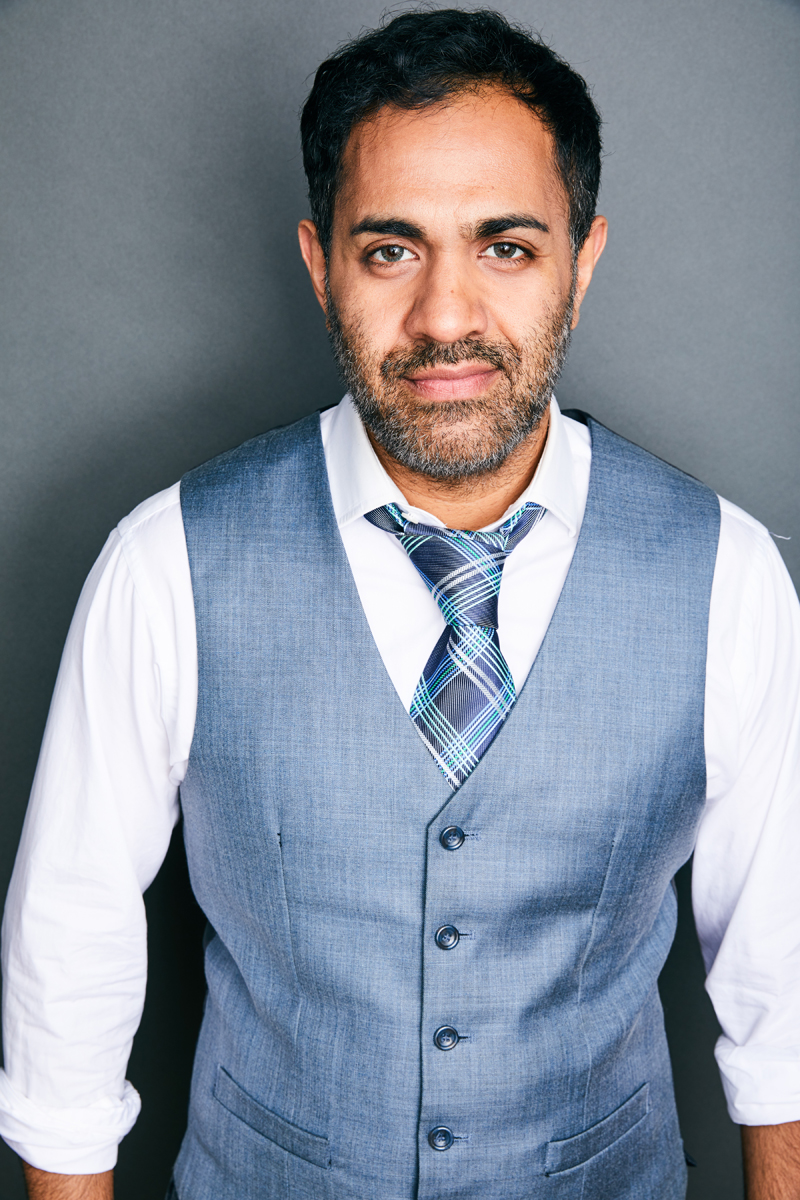
- Born: Rahul Nath Mahant
- Occupations: Actor, writer, dancer/choreographer and director
- Years active: 2002-present
- Known for: Happy Ending, Faraar

Rahul Nath (born Rahul Nath Mahant) is an American/British Indian actor, writer, dancer/choreographer and director who is best known for his role in the Bollywood film Happy Ending (2014), the Pollywood film Faraar (2015) and for his recurring role on the Netflix show Space Force.

== Early life ==
Nath was brought up in both India and the UK. As a result of his time in India, he can converse in Hindi, Urdu and Punjabi language and has an understanding of Tamil language and Telugu language. In his time in the UK he attended the Guy's Hospital School of Dentistry, where he obtained his degree in dental surgery before pursuing a career in acting. He currently lives in Los Angeles.

== Career ==
Nath has appeared in TV shows and off West End Theatre plays that gathered him a lot attention for his ability to transform his body.
He was seen in TV shows that aired on BBC, ITV and Channel 4.

Nath has been in commercials for Jack in the Box, Travelzoo, Virgin America and State Farm Insurance. In the State Farm campaign, he was paired opposite NBA superstar Chris Paul for a series of commercials titled 'The Power of an Assist'.

In 2011, he turned director presenting reality based subjects that were focused around the South Asian community. His first release. Foreign, starred Ananya Khare. He then released his second movie 'Compromise', but the response was mixed.

In 2025, Nath appeared in a national advertising campaign for GEICO, portraying a fine dining waiter alongside the company's mascot, the Gecko. The campaign included television, online, and social media promotions and premiered during the 2025 Emmy Awards broadcast.

In 2014, he directed a feature movie, Khazana, that showcases the revenge that is carried out by a girl who suffers domestic abuse. The film is now streaming on Amazon Prime.

In 2013 he was paired opposite Saif Ali Khan in the Illuminati Films production Happy Ending, where he had a supporting role. The movie was a disappointment at the box office, but Nath managed to gather attention and critical praise for his role and contribution to the movie. His next role was with Gippy Grewal as his younger brother in Gippy Grewal Productions Faraar. The film received a positive response at the box office.

Nath has been a part of the cast of Adam Ruins Everything and I'm Sorry, that air on the truTV Network. In 2019, he joined the cast of a Netflix show Space Force opposite Steve Carell in a recurring role where he plays Dr Chandrasekhar.

=== Dance ===
He was given the award of 'Best Bollywood Dancer in Los Angeles" by LA Magazine in 2013.

=== Court Interpreting ===
In addition to his work in entertainment, Nath is a registered and provisionally qualified court interpreter in San Bernardino County, California. He provides court interpretation services in Hindi, Urdu, and Punjabi, and obtained his certification in early 2025. Nath performs his court interpreting work under his birth name, Rahul Nath Mahant, and continues to serve the San Bernardino court district alongside his acting career.

== Filmography ==
- Foreign (2011)
- Compromise
- Khazana (2014)
- Happy Ending (2014) as Gary
- Faraar (2015)
- Space Force (2019)
