= Akaal: The Unconquered =

Punjabi film by Gippy Grewal

- Theatrical poster
- Directed by: Gippy Grewal
- Written by: Gippy Grewal
- Produced by: Karan Johar; Adar Poonawalla; Apoorva Mehta; Gippy Grewal
- Starring: Gippy Grewal; Nimrat Khaira; Gurpreet Ghuggi; Nikitin Dheer; Shinda Grewal
- Cinematography: Baljit Singh Deo
- Edited by: Junaid Chaudhary
- Music by: Songs: Shankar–Ehsaan–Loy; Score: Dipesh Varma
- Production companies: Dharma Productions; Humble Motion Pictures; White Hill Studios
- Release date: 10 April 2025
- Country: India
- Languages: Hindi; Punjabi

Akaal: The Unconquered is a 2025 Indian historical drama film directed, written, and produced by Gippy Grewal. Co-produced by Dharma Productions and presented in both Punjabi and Hindi, it stars Gippy Grewal, Nimrat Khaira, Gurpreet Ghuggi, Nikitin Dheer, and Shinda Grewal. Set in 1840s Punjab after the death of Maharaja Ranjit Singh, the film depicts the resistance of Sikh warrior Akaal Singh against antagonistic forces. Released on 10 April 2025, coinciding with Vaisakhi, it marks Dharma Productions’ debut in Punjabi cinema.

== Plot ==
Set in the 1840s in Punjab, Akaal: The Unconquered follows Sardar Akaal Singh, a Sikh warrior, as he leads his village to resist the attacks of Jangi Jahan and his sister Khatroo following the death of Maharaja Ranjit Singh. Supported by his wife, Sahej Kaur, son Zora Singh, and ally Bhai Sukha Singh, Akaal Singh defends his community, reflecting Sikh values of courage and resilience.

== Cast ==
- Gippy Grewal as Sardar Akaal Singh
- Nimrat Khaira as Sahej Kaur, Akaal Singh's wife
- Nikitin Dheer as Jangi Jahan, the main antagonist
- Gurpreet Ghuggi as Bhai Sukha Singh
- Apinderdeep Singh as Bachna
- Shinda Grewal as Charat Singh, Akaal Singh's son
- Mita Vashisht as Khatroo, Jangi Jahan's sister
- Prince Kanwaljit Singh as Dina
- Ekom Grewal as Balbir Singh
- Jaggi Singh as Sardar Mehtab Singh
- Baljinder Singh Darapuri as Mukhtyar
- Raj Hundal as Maharaja Ranjit Singh

== Production ==
Filming began in November 2024 in Punjab, with sets and costumes designed to reflect the 1840s period. The film was produced by Humble Motion Pictures and Dharma Productions. The music was composed by Shankar–Ehsaan–Loy. The trailer was launched in March 2025.

== Soundtrack ==
All lyrics are written by Happy Raikoti.

No.	Title	Singer(s)	Length
1.	"Satnam Waheguru"	Sonu Nigam
2.	"Ik Vaada"	Arijit Singh
3.	"Akaal - Title Track"	Sukhwinder Singh, Bohemia
4.	"Kan Kan"	Shankar Mahadevan, Shreya Ghoshal
5.	"Ik Singh"	Gippy Grewal

== Reception ==
The film received mixed reviews. The Times of India rated it 3.5 out of 5 stars, praising the action sequences and performances by Gippy Grewal and Nimrat Khaira, but noting pacing issues in the second half. The Indian Express gave it 2 out of 5 stars, commending the visuals but criticising the predictable storyline. News24 praised the visuals and Khaira’s performance, but noted narrative weaknesses. ABP Live rated it 3 out of 5 stars, appreciating the emotional depth but highlighting an overstretched narrative. The Tribune noted its emotional resonance and historical context.

== Controversy ==
The film faced criticism from some members of the Sikh community for allegedly misrepresenting Sikh values, particularly through depictions of characters consuming alcohol and sporting shaved heads. Baba Bakshish Singh was detained by Patiala police after threatening action against the film. The filmmakers had not responded officially to the controversy as of April 2025.
