= Manje Bistre =

2017 Indian film Punjabi-language film

- Film poster
- Directed by: Baljit Singh Deo
- Written by: Gippy Grewal
- Screenplay by: Gippy Grewal
- Produced by: Gippy Grewal
- Starring: Gippy Grewal; Sonam Bajwa; Gurpreet Ghuggi; Jaggi Singh; Karamjit Anmol; B.N. Sharma; Rana Ranbir
- Cinematography: Baljit Singh Deo
- Edited by: Rohit Dhiman
- Music by: Jassi Katyal; Jaison Thind; Huraira Zafar
- Production company: Humble Motion Pictures
- Distributed by: White Hill Studios
- Release date: 14 April 2017
- Running time: 137 minutes
- Country: India
- Language: Punjabi
- Budget: ₹7 Crore
- Box office: ₹31.74 Crore (see below)

Manje Bistre (transl. Bed-blankets, essential needs) is a 2017 Indian Punjabi-language family drama romantic comedy film featuring Gippy Grewal and Sonam Bajwa in lead roles while Karamjit Anmol, Jaggi Singh, Sardar Sohi and Hobby Dhaliwal in supporting roles. The film is set up against the backdrop of traditional Punjabi wedding. The dialogues are penned by Rana Ranbir, and the story and screenplay is written by Gippy Grewal. It is directed by Baljit Singh Deo and was released on 14 April 2017.

== Plot ==
The story revolves around a Punjabi wedding, with elements of romance and comedy. Sukhi, while preparing for his sister's wedding, meets Rano and immediately falls in love with her. Rano, Sukhi's sister's friend, is a hesitant lover and during their romantic development many colorful characters appear. One person named Daddy helped both to get in one life.

== Cast ==
- Gippy Grewal as Sukhchain "Sukhi" Grewal
- Sonam Bajwa as Rano
- Karamjit Anmol as Sadhu Halwai
- Rana Ranbir as Seeta
- B.N. Sharma as Sureela
- Gurpreet Ghuggi as Daddy
- Jaggi Singh as Chadar
- Sardar Sohi as Jellu mama
- Sara Gurpal as Bholi
- Hobby Dhaliwal as Shamsher Grewal, Sukhi's father
- Rana Jung Bahadur as Chhotu
- Dilpreet Dhillon as Groom
- Harby Sangha as Sukhi's Jeeja
- Anita Devgan as Sukhi's Mami
- Seema Kaushal as Sukhi's mother
- Malkeet Rauni as Sukhi's Mama
- Harinder Bhullar as Dokal
- Parkash Gadhu as Tota
- Rana Jung Bahadur as Chhotu
- Sara Gurpal as Bholi
- Raghveer Boli as Kaleja
- Kul Sidhu as Seeti

== Production ==
Manje Bistre was shot between November, 2016 and December, 2016 in 22 days at different villages in Punjab, including Kakrali, Seyonk, Jenti Majri, Ghura Kasoli, Bhangidi, Parol, Choti Badi Nangal and Mullanpur Garibdas.

== Release ==
The official trailer of the film was released by Saga Music on 5 March 2017.

The film was theatrically released on 14 April 2017.

== Box office ==
According to Box Office India Manje Bistre had grossed ₹31.74 crore in its whole theatrical run which includes ₹16.29 crore in India and ₹15.45 crore in overseas. It is also the fourth highest grossing Punjabi movie of all time behind Carry on Jatta 2, Chaar Sahibzaade and Sardaar Ji according to the Box Office India reports. On release the film was announced as a huge hit. After two weeks of the release, Baahubali 2: The Conclusion was released which affected the further collections of Manje Bistre in India and Overseas. Baahubali 2: The Conclusion is also the highest-grossing film in India and also in East Punjab.

=== India ===
According to the Taran Adarsh’s report, on its opening day Manje Bistre grossed ₹2.25 crore becoming the 3rd highest Punjabi opener of all time behind Sardaar Ji and Sardaar Ji 2 later moved to 5th after release of Carry on Jatta 2 and Shadaa Whereas, film faced drop in collection on its second collecting ₹2.18 crore and rise on third day, collecting ₹2.59 crore making the weekend total ₹7.02 crore. The film faces small drop on weekdays collecting ₹1.27 crore, ₹1.06 crore, ₹1.03 crore and ₹0.91 crore respectively making a week total ₹11.29 crore. The film grossed ₹14.71 crore in 10 days of release. According to Box Office India report published in June 2018, Manje Bistre is the 6th highest Punjabi grosser of all time in India by its lifetime collection of ₹16.29 crore behind Carry On Jatta 2, Sardaar Ji, Chaar Sahibzaade, Sardaar Ji 2 and Jatt & Juliet 2.

=== Overseas ===
On its opening weekend, Manje Bistre collected $241,971 (₹1.56 crore) in United States, $385,147 (₹2.49 crore) in Canada, £104,136 (₹85.93 lacs) in United Kingdom, A$402,399 (₹1.98 crore) in Australia and NZ$125,403 (₹56.66 lacs) in New Zealand. After second week, the film grosses $456,065 (₹2.94 crore) in United States, $722,562 (₹4.66 crore) in Canada, £219,339 (₹1.81 crore) in United Kingdom, A$652,618 (₹3.19 crore) in Australia and NZ$185,884 (₹84.34 lacs) in New Zealand. In its whole theatrical run Manje Bistre had grossed ₹2.28 crore at United Kingdom, ₹6.25 crore at Canada, ₹3.43 crore at United States of America, ₹3.33 crore at Australia, ₹85.14 lacs at New Zealand, and ₹8.4 lacs at Spain.

== Soundtrack ==
Manje Bistre

Soundtrack album by Jay K (Jassi Katyal), Jaison Thind
- Released: 7 April 2017
- Recorded: 2017
- Genre: Feature film soundtrack
- Length: 29:26
- Label: Saga Music
External audio
- Audio Jukebox on YouTube

The music of songs have been composed by Jay K (Jassi Katyal) and Jaison Thind. The lyrics are by Happy Raikoti, Ricky Khan, Jagdev Maan, and Dalvir.

Track listing
No.	Title	Singer(s)	Length
1.	"Jatt Attitude"	Gippy Grewal	4:54
2.	"Dubai Wale Sheikh"	Gippy Grewal, Nimrat Khaira	4:52
3.	"Vekh Ke Hasdi"	Ammy Virk	4:59
4.	"Kasoor"	Khan Saab	5:25
5.	"Manje Bistre"	Nacchatar Gill	4:26
6.	"Ja Vi Na"	Karamjit Anmol	4:50
Total length:			29:26

== Reception ==
Manje Bistre received mostly positive reviews from critics and audience both. The first half of the film tickles the funny bones of the film goers, while the second half is high on romantic quotient, say the critics and viewers.

Jasmine Singh of The Tribune praised the film's simplicity. He also praises director, saying, “Director Baljit Singh Deo has done a neat direction, making sure that every character in the film gets a decent screen space.“ He also writes about dialogues, “The dialogues of the film are written by Rana Ranbir and he certainly has done a fine job.” He also praises the cinematography of the film, saying, “The entire film is centred at one place, a wedding house, despite the fact that there aren't many locations to feast your eyes on; a beautiful and well shot cinematography makes everything look bright and fun.” The reviewer praised the costume designer of the film Ravneet Grewal and the lead actress Sonam Bajwa. In last the consensus reads, “The film has foot-tapping numbers, subtle romance, lot of fun moments, loads of laughter; Manje Bistre has sure collected the right entertainment dose.”

== Awards ==
=== Winners ===
==== Jio Filmfare Awards Punjabi (2018) ====
- Best Supporting Actor - Karamjit Anmol
- Best Screenplay - Gippy Grewal

==== Brit Asia Punjabi Film Awards (2018) ====
- Best Film - Manje Bistre
- Best Director - Baljit Singh Deo
- Best Actor - Gippy Grewal
- Best Comedian - Karamjit Anmol
- Best Supporting Actor - Karamjit Anmol
- Best Film Song - Gippy Grewal & Nimrat Khaira for "Dubai Wale Shaikh"
- Best Female Playback Vocalist - Nimrat Khaira for "Dubai Wale Shaikh"

== Sequels ==
Sequel of the film, Manje Bistre 2, directed by Baljit Singh Deo and starring Gippy Grewal and Simi Chahal was released on 12 April 2019. The sequel was shot in Canada depicting Sukhi`s journey to attend his cousin’s marriage ceremony.

A sequel to this film titled Manje Bistre 3 directed by Baljit Singh Deo and produced by Gippy Grewal and Ravneet Kaur Grewal is set to release on 26 July 2024.
