= Hero Naam Yaad Rakhi =

2015 film by Baljit Singh Deo

Hero 'Naam Yaad Rakhi'
- Directed by: Baljit Singh Deo
- Screenplay by: Manoj Jha
- Story by: Manoj Jha
- Produced by: Ankit Vijan; Jatinder Punia; Navkiran Singh Dhaliwal
- Starring: Jimmy Sheirgill; Surveen Chawla; Mukul Dev
- Cinematography: Ravi Kumar Sana
- Edited by: Rohit Dhiman
- Music by: Hitesh Modak
- Production company: Shri Narotam Films Ltd.
- Distributed by: Speed Records
- Release date: 10 July 2015
- Running time: 100 minutes
- Country: India
- Language: Punjabi

Hero Naam Yaad Rakhi is 2015 Punjabi romantic thriller film with story screenplay and dialogues penned by Manoj Jha and directed by Baljit Singh Deo. The film as known is inspired by a real incident that happened in British Columbia. The film features Jimmy Sheirgill and Surveen Chawla in lead roles.

== Cast ==
- Jimmy Sheirgill as Hero
- Surveen Chawla as Heena
- Mukul Dev as Jeet (Hero's Brother)
- Shavinder Mahal as Heena's Father
- Jaggi Singh as Angad (Heena's Boyfriend)

== Soundtrack ==
Hero Naam Yaad Rakhi

Soundtrack album by Jatinder Shah, Hitesh Modak, Money Aujla
- Released: 23 June 2015
- Genre: Feature film soundtrack
- Length: 36:24
- Language: Punjabi
- Label: Venus
External audio
- Audio Jukebox on YouTube

The soundtrack of Hero Naam Yaad Rakhi consists of 9 songs composed by Jatinder Shah, Hitesh Modak, Money Aujla the lyrics of which have been written by Veet Baljit, Inda Raikoti and Pirti Silon.

Tracklist
No.	Title	Lyrics	Music	Singer(s)	Length
1.	"AK 47"	Veet Baljit	Jatinder Shah	Diljit Dosanjh	03:10
2.	"Deed Teri"	Inda Raikoti	Hitesh Modak	Rahat Fateh Ali Khan	05:15
3.	"Dard Ve Sajna"	Inda Raikoti	Hitesh Modak	Arif Lohar	04:59
4.	"Sohneya Sajna"	Inda Raikoti	Jatinder Shah	Ankit Tiwari & Sunidhi Chauhan	03:46
5.	"Naina"	Veet Baljit	Jatinder Shah	Kamal Khan & Khushboo Grewal	03:06
6.	"Putt Han Garib Jatt Da"	Veet Baljit	Jatinder Shah	Veet Baljit & Ikka Singh	04:15
7.	"Hero"	Pirti Silon	Money Aujla	Stylish Singh & Golu	04:26
8.	"Deed Teri"	Inda Raikoti	Hitesh Modak	Altamash Faridi	04:06
9.	"Naina Ne Rehna Mere"	Veet Baljit	Jatinder Shah	Rahat Fateh Ali Khan & Khushboo Grewal	03:17
Total length:					36:24

== Release ==
The movie was released in theaters on 10 July 2015. It is also available on Ott platform Chaupal for the digital audience to stream.

== Reception ==
=== Critical response ===
Divya Pal of CNN-IBN described the film as "far-from-perfect", commenting that the film "could have done a lot better had the director tried his best to create edge-of-seat suspense." Pal also criticized the characters, noting that they "could have been a lot more believable and compelling."
