= Faraar (2015 film) =

2015 film by Baljit Singh Deo

- Punjabi: ਫਰਾਰ
- Directed by: Baljit Singh Deo
- Written by: Jas Grewal
- Produced by: Sippy Grewal; Nitin Talwar
- Starring: Gippy Grewal; Kainaat Arora
- Cinematography: Baljit Singh Deo
- Edited by: Baljit Singh Deo; Sun Gill
- Music by: Jatinder Shah; Dr Zeus; Bohemia; Rahat Fateh Ali Khan
- Production company: Sippy Grewal Productions
- Distributed by: Saga Music
- Release date: 28 August 2015
- Country: India
- Language: Punjabi

Faraar (transl. Absconding, or escape) is a 2015 Indian Punjabi-language film starring Gippy Grewal and Kainaat Arora in lead roles. Gippy Grewal played a double role character in the movie. The movie was released on 28 August 2015.

== Plot ==
Ekam, a young man from Punjab, India has just been admitted to a university based in Los Angeles, United States and is about to fly to America as dreamed by most Punjabi. On the airplane, Ekam meets Jasmine, a US resident.

When Ekam is crossing the US border of entry at Los Angeles airport, he is stopped by border officers who are not denying his entry, but want to arrest him. The police tells him that he resembles a criminal in Los Angeles responsible for the death of 3 civilians and 2 cops. The criminal is named Shinda and was believed to have died in a blast, until now. Police now believe Shinda did not die but is now entering the US with a new identity Ekam. Ekam now needs to prove he is not Shinda, but simply looks like him. Ekam knows no one in the US, so he calls Jasmine for help, who contacts a Punjabi lawyer for him—Karanvir Jatana.

After a brief investigation of Ekam's background, Jatana takes his case. He and Jasmine later visit Shinda's house to collect evidence for Ekam. They find a diary believed to belong to Sunny, Shinda's cousin and best friend, which tells them the story of Shinda and Sunny.

Shinda was an illegal immigrant in the US who made a living by participating in illegal fighting competition. Sunny once lost US$100,000 in gambling, 80,000 of which were borrowed from a famous mafia Frank, who threatened to kill Sunny if he could not pay the debt within two days. To repay debt for Sunny, Shinda had no choice but to make a deal with Kaptaan, another famous mafia who wanted Shinda to fight in a more brutal fighting competition—to beat the rival to death.

Shinda made it by beating his rival to death, and Kaptaan was therefore very impressed by Shinda and wanted Shinda to work for him. Ekam only needed one amount of money to repay Sunny's debt, so he rejected and humiliated Kaptaan. Kaptaan later kidnapped Shinda's girlfriend Nicky and demanded ransom of US$500,000. Kaptaan's plan was to leave Shinda no choice but to work for him for the ransom money. However, Shinda immediately realized it was Kaptaan's plot and rejected to work for him, vowing to pay the ransom by himself.

Shinda did not collect enough money for the ransom, but instead rescued Nicky by killing 5 of the kidnappers, 2 of whom were later found to be police from news reports. That's how Shinda realized police were on Kaptaan's side. The diary ends with Shinda, Sunny and Nicky going to meet Kaptaan.

Jatana decides to find more evidence by visiting Sunny's girlfriend Preeti. Jatana, along with Ekam, are shocked to see Nicky's photo shown by Preeti, which turns out to be Jasmine. The two angrily confront Jasmine, who confesses she is indeed Nicky and hid her identity to protect Ekam. Jasmine/Nicky tells them the following story untold in the diary.

Sunny was shot dead by Kaptaan, and Nicky and Shinda were later on the run from cops. Police finally found them, and Shinda was killed in an accidental blast during the encounter just in front of Nicky.

Nicky later testifies in the court that she witnessed Shinda's death, making the judge believe Ekam is not Shinda finding him not guilty.

Jatana later learns that Ekam is Shinda by making a phone call to Ekam's claimed mother. Ekam/Shinda tells him that he faked his identity to re-enter the US for revenge.

Shinda contacts Kaptaan and the two fix their duel. During the duel, Shinda kills Kaptaan.

== Cast ==
- Gippy Grewal in a dual role as Shinda and Ekam
- Kainaat Arora as Jasmine/Nikki
- Jaggi Singh as Kaptaan
- Rahul Nath as Sunny, Shinda's brother

== Reception ==
=== Box office ===
Faraar collected overall ₹10.7 million (US$110,000) from 84 screens at the overseas box office in the first weekend making it third highest opening of 2015 after Sardaar Ji and Angrej. Faraar in its second week grossed a total of ₹19.4 million (US$200,000) in the international markets in 10 days.

=== Critical response ===
Jasmine Singh of The Tribune gave 4 stars out of 5 and termed movie as good to watch.

== Track List ==
S. No.	Track	Singer	Music	Lyrics
1.	"Jatti"	Gippy Grewal & Sunidhi Chauhan	Jatinder Shah	Jagdev Maan
2.	"Budwaar"	Gippy Grewal	Jatinder Shah	Amrit Maan
3.	"Etwaar"	Jazzy B	Dr Zeus	Amrit Maan
4.	"Parne Nu"	Manmohan Waris	Jatinder Shah	Happy Raikoti
5.	"Taur"	Gippy Grewal & Bohemia	Bohemia	Bohemia & Happy Raikoti & Ikka
6.	"Badla"	Ranjit Bawa	Jatinder Shah	Happy Raikoti
7.	"Hathan Dian Lakeeran"	Rahat Fateh Ali Khan	Rahat Fateh Ali Khan	S. M. Sadiq
8.	"Diamond"	Gippy Grewal	Jatinder Shah	Happy Raikoti
9.	"Parne Nu" (Female)	Harshdeep Kaur	Jatinder Shah	Happy Raikoti
