= Tanu Grewal =

Canadian actress

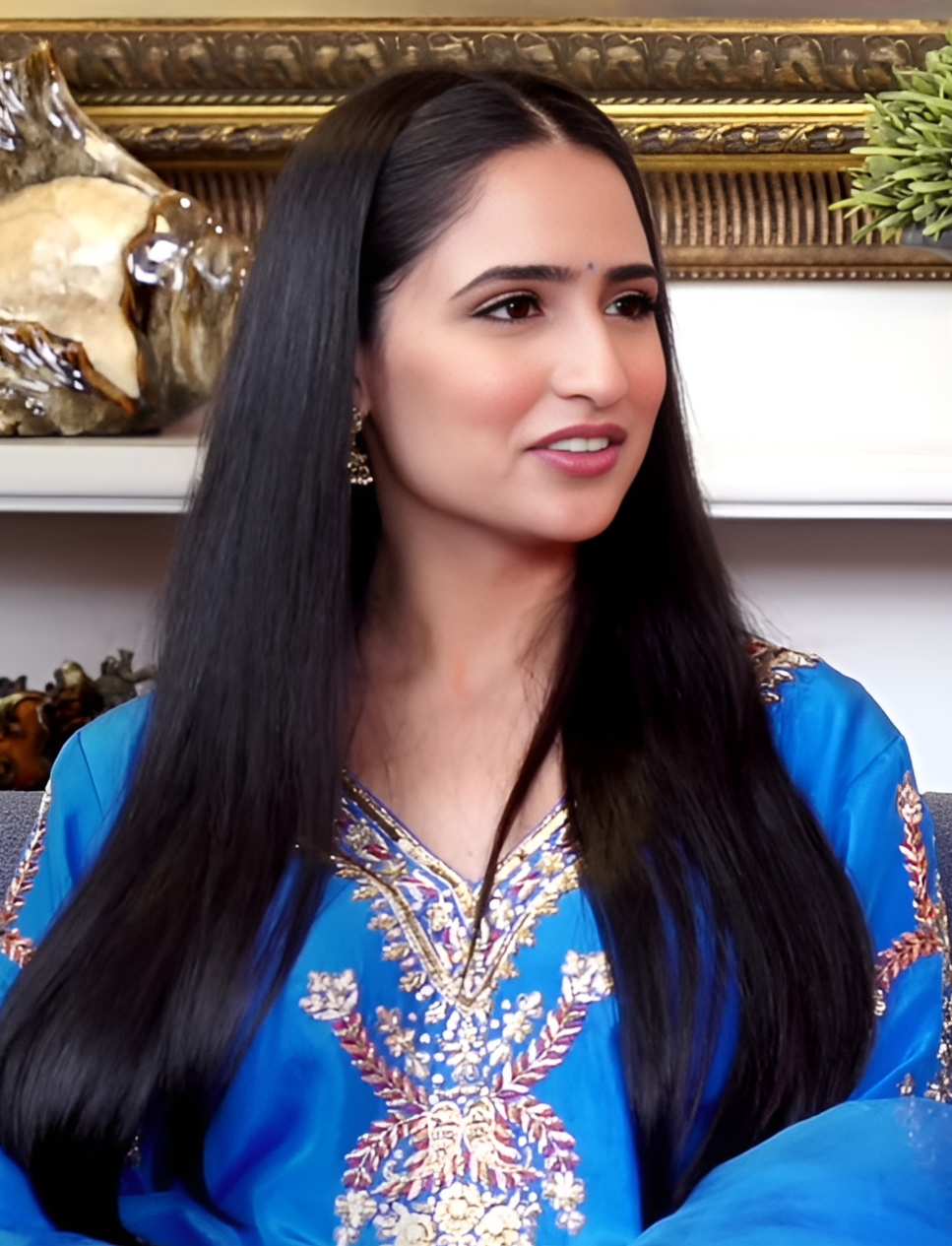
- Grewal in 2025
- Born: 27 January 2001 (age 25); Vancouver, British Columbia, Canada
- Citizenship: Canadian
- Occupation: Actress
- Years active: 2019–present
- Known for: Yaar Mera Titliaan Warga

Tanu Grewal is a Canadian actress of Indian origin who made her debut in the Punjabi-language comedy film Shava Ni Girdhari Lal as Kuljeet. She also played the lead role in Punjabi film Yaar Mera Titliaan Warga and music video Chitta Kurta.

== Early life and career ==
Tanu was born on 27 January 2001, in Vancouver, British Columbia, Canada to immigrant parents from Punjab. She attended David Thompson Secondary School from where she obtained her High School Diploma. She started her career through Punjabi music videos such as Chitta Kurta, Chithiyan, Rim vs Jhanjar, Lifestyle by Amrit Mann, Punjaban by Rajvir Jawanda and Laut Aana by Karan Aujla. She made her debut as an actress in the film Shava Ni Girdhari Lal from which she won the best debut actress award by PTC Punjabi and in 2022 she played the lead role in Yaar Mera Titliaan Warga.

== Filmography ==
Key

=== Actor ===
Year	Film	Role	Language	Ref.
2021	Shava Ni Girdhari Lal	Kuljeet	Punjabi	
2022	Yaar Mera Titliaan Warga	Beant	Punjabi	
2023	Maujaan Hi Maujaan		Punjabi	
2023	Munda Southall Da		Punjabi	
2023	Outlaw		Punjabi	

== Awards ==
Year	Award	Category	Film	Result	Ref.
2022	PTC Punjabi Film Awards	Best Debut Female	Shava Ni Girdhari Lal	Won	
