= Happy Ending (2014 film) =

2014 Indian film by Raj & DK

- Theatrical release poster
- Directed by: Raj and D.K.
- Written by: Story and Screenplay: Raj Nidimoru; Sita Menon; Krishna D.K. Dialogues: Hussain Dalal
- Produced by: Saif Ali Khan; Dinesh Vijan; Sunil Lulla
- Starring: Saif Ali Khan; Ileana D'Cruz; Kalki Koechlin; Govinda; Preity Zinta; Ranvir Shorey
- Narrated by: Saif Ali Khan
- Cinematography: Chase Bowman; Yaron Levy; Mahesh Limaye
- Edited by: Arindam S. Ghatak; Akiv Ali
- Music by: Sachin–Jigar
- Production company: Illuminati Films
- Distributed by: Eros International
- Release date: 21 November 2014
- Running time: 136 minutes
- Country: India
- Language: Hindi
- Budget: ₹570 million
- Box office: ₹380 million

Happy Ending is a 2014 Indian Hindi-language romantic comedy film written and directed by Raj Nidimoru and Krishna D.K. The film is produced by Saif Ali Khan, Dinesh Vijan and Sunil Lulla under Illuminati Films and stars Khan, Ileana D'Cruz, Kalki Koechlin, Govinda, and Ranvir Shorey with Preity Zinta in an extended cameo appearance. The film was released on 21 November 2014 to mixed to positive reviews.

== Plot ==
Writer Yudi (Saif Ali Khan) wrote a hit book five and a half years ago and is still living life king-size in Los Angeles, enjoying fame and affairs, avoiding commitment, doing no work, partying with his miserably married friend Montu (Ranvir Shorey) or having conversations with his fat, bearded inner voice brother Yogi (also Saif). Suddenly, Yudi's money runs out and his publishers dump him for hit romance novelist Aanchal (Ileana D'Cruz), visiting from Mumbai.

The only work Yudi now gets is from Bollywood single-screen superstar Armaan (Govinda) who insists he copy Hollywood films and write a multiplex-style romantic comedy. Meanwhile, Yudi's dentist and once-girlfriend Vishakha (Kalki Koechlin) is pursuing him obsessively, even loading videos of him singing in the shower on her laptop, forcing Yudi and Montu to break into her home when she's away. On top of this, Yudi's got severe writer's block, stopping him from finishing any work.

Running away from it all, Yudi tries to charm Aanchal but she's commitment-averse too. However, she gradually warms up to him, escorting him to Armaan's party, trying to help Yudi write, and even agreeing to take a road trip with him to her book reading in San Francisco.

Eventually reaching San Francisco, the couple is forced to share a hotel room – and after agreeing to keep it simple and commitment-free, they end up making sex. Their relationship grows funnier – on Aanchal's last night in LA, they argue over dinner, Yudi throws her phone into a vase while she douses him with water – but neither expresses anything more than a sense of light fun. It's only when Yudi's ex-girlfriend Divya (Priety Zinta), having argued with her husband and visiting Yudi with her kids, tells him he loves Aanchal that he admits it to himself.

Yudi then races Aanchal's taxi to the airport in a hilarious scene and tells her his feelings, but she expresses her wish to remain friends with him. As she leaves, Yudi sinks into depression, and then starts to write. Along the way, Vishakha gets engaged to a panic-stricken Yudi by falsely claiming she's pregnant – but then breaks it off, saying she doesn't want him to marry her out of pity.

Armaan, who has meanwhile gotten himself cosmetic surgery and six-pack abs in LA, is impressed with the 'kick-ass' script Yudi presents him. However, for the script's ending, Yudi goes to Mumbai and sees Aanchal where he tells her they can take it one day at a time – and perhaps live their whole lives together like that. Aanchal smiles and the happy ending begins.

== Cast ==
- Saif Ali Khan as Yudi Jaitley/Yogi
- Ileana D'Cruz as Aanchal Reddy
- Kalki Koechlin as Vishakha Singh
- Govinda as Armaan Malik
- Preity Zinta as Divya, Yudi's ex-girlfriend (extended cameo appearance)
- Ranvir Shorey as Montu Irani
- Rahul Nath as Gary
- Shivani Tanksale as Gauri
- Kareena Kapoor Khan as June Pinto, Yudi's ex-girlfriend (cameo appearance)

== Production ==
Some parts of the film were shot in Ann Arbor, Michigan.

Saif Ali Khan makes a guest appearance despite playing the lead role, a rare instance in film. Yudi is the leading character and he plays Yogi in the cameo. Ileana D'Cruz's boyfriend Andrew Kneebone is making a guest appearance although he is not an actor. Kareena Kapoor Khan and Preity Zinta also make guest appearances in the film.

== Soundtrack ==
The music of the film is composed by the duo Sachin–Jigar while lyrics are penned by Amitabh Bhattacharya, Priya Saraiya, and Ashish Pandit. The song "Paaji Tussi Such a Pussy Cat" was released as a single prior to the film's audio launch. The song "Jaise Mera Tu" is reused from the song "Meher Meher" from the Telugu film D for Dopidi, also composed by Sachin–Jigar.

No.	Title	Singer(s)	Length
1.	"Mileya Mileya"	Rekha Bhardwaj, Jigar Saraiya, Priya Andrews	4:26
2.	"Paaji Tussi Such a Pussy Cat"	Amitabh Bhattacharya, Jigar Saraiya, Divya Kumar	3:40
3.	"Jaise Mera Tu"	Arijit Singh, Priya Saraiya	4:16
4.	"G Phaad Ke"	Divya Kumar, Bilal Saeed, Sunidhi Chauhan	3:13
5.	"Khamma Ghani"	Papon, Smita Nair Jain, Vidhi Mehta	4:30
6.	"Haseena Tu Kameena Main"	Siddharth Basrur, Rahul Pandey, Shruti Pathak	4:07

== Awards and nominations ==
- Stardust Award for Best Supporting Actor - Govinda
- Nominated – Star Screen Award for Best Comic Actor - Govinda
- Nominated – Producers Guild Awards for Best Comic Actor - Govinda
