= Khazana (2014 film) =

- Theatrical release poster
- Directed by: Rahul Nath
- Written by: Rahul Nath, Noah Potter
- Produced by: Noah Potter
- Cinematography: Stephen Treadway
- Edited by: Salman Syed
- Production company: Nik/Nak Productions
- Release date: 23 August 2014 (United States)
- Running time: 1 hr 12 min
- Countries: United States; United Kingdom; India
- Language: English

Khazana is a 2014 drama horror thriller film directed by Rahul Nath and co-produced by Noah Potter. The film stars an assembled cast that includes Ulka Simone Mohanty, Ahmed Lucan, Shruti Tewari, Bahram Khosraviani, Reem Kadem, Sonam Arvind Dhage, Laikh Tewari and Rahul Nath himself. The film's story revolves around a young bride who questions her sanity as she faces abuse at the hands of her new family until the day she decides to fight back.

The film was released on limited screens in the United States on August 23, 2014. The film was also screened at the Jaipur International Film Festival and the Nashik International Film Festival in India.

== Cast ==
- Ulka Simone Mohanty as Vaidehi
- Ahmed Lucan as Amar
- Shruti Tewari as Chand
- Bahram Khosraviani as Rishi
- Reem Kadem as Neelima
- Sonam Arvind Dhage as Sapna
- Laikh Tewari as Dhaman
- Rahul Nath as Arun

== Plot ==
Khazana tells the story of newlywed bride Vaidehi, who after undergoing emotional, mental and ultimately physical abuse takes a stand and sets out to take her revenge on those who destroyed her. She calls all her friends and family to a dinner planned by herself so that secrets can be revealed and shocking revelations made. Through the dinner and multiple flashbacks, we see the various interactions that she has had with all those at the dinner table and how they have abused her and taken advantage of her. She pretends that everyone is there to save her and help her escape the trauma that she is bearing, but secretly she has pre-planned the dinner so that she can expose everyone's true character and also what they have done to her. Little do the guests know that they are at the table because 'Revenge is Served'!
