= Alex vs ARod =

2025 documentary series

Alex vs. A-Rod is a 2025 documentary series which explores the life and career of baseball player Alex Rodriguez.
