= Arjan Dhillon =

Indian singer-rapper

- Born: 14 December; Bhadaur, Punjab, India
- Origin: Punjab, India
- Genres: Pop; R&B; hip-hop; pop rap
- Occupations: Singer; rapper; songwriter
- Instrument: Vocals
- Years active: 2017–present
- Labels: Brown Studios, Panj-aab Records

Arjan Dhillon is an Indian singer and writer known for his work in Punjabi music. He started as a songwriter in 2017. Dhillon pursued his musical career as a lead artist in 2018 with the track "Ishq Jeha Ho Gya" in the film Afsar. He got his breakthrough with his single track "Bai Bai", released on 29 October 2020 followed by "My Fellas". Dhillon released his debut EP The Future on 25 November 2020 and his debut studio album Awara on 25 November 2021.

== Early life ==
Dhillon is a Punjabi and was born and raised in Bhadaur town in Barnala district of Punjab, India.

== Career ==
=== 2017–2019: Debut as songwriter and lead singer ===
Dhillon started his career as a lyricist in 2017, initially penned various tracks for Nimrat Khaira, including "Suit", "Tohar", "Lehnga", And "Ranihaar". In 2018, he started his singing career with the song "Ishq Jeha Ho Gaya" from Afsar's soundtrack, he also penned four tracks "Udhar Chalda", Sun Sohniye", "Khat", "Ravaya Na Kar" of the soundtrack. Following this, he also penned Hustinder's "Pind Puchdi" and Nishawn Bhullar's "Muchh". Dhillon released his debut single track "Shera Samb Lai" in June 2019 through the Brown Studios YouTube channel.

=== 2020–2021: Musical breakthrough, The Future, Awara ===
In March 2020, he released "Jatt di Janeman". This song was followed by his track "Uber". He finally came into the spotlight in 2020 with his single tracks "Bai Bai" and "My Fellas", and also released various other successful tracks like "Kala Jaadu" and "Mull Pyar Da" in the following months. On 25 November 2020, he released his debut EP The Future, consisting of six tracks. Later on 30 November, Dhillon released his single track "Panjab Kithe Dabda", to show his solidarity with the 2020–2021 Indian farmers' protest. Following this, he released one more non-commercial song, named "Soorme Aun Tareeka Te".

In February 2021, Dhillon released 3 songs "Gutt", "Likhari", and "Jutti" on the same day, with the video of "Gutt" song which is the most viewed song of Arjan Dhillon on YouTube with more than 50 million views. Besides, Dhillon released 5 single tracks in 2021, including "Jaagde Raho", "Pindaa De Naa", "Pehli Peshi", "My Rulez" and "Kalli Sohni". In 2021, Dhillon wrote the lyrics for Diljit Dosanjh's "Luna" from his MoonChild Era album. The album peaked at no. 32 on Canadian Albums Chart by Billboard. In October, Dhillon featured as guest artist for the first time on Shipra Goyal's "Koke", he also penned that song. In November 2021, he announced his debut studio album Awara, which was released on 25 November. His debut album charted at No. 8 on Spotify Top Albums Debut Global, at No. 1 on Spotify Top Albums India and at No. 2 on Apple Music Top Indian Albums. Dhillon reached 1 million followers on Instagram in December 2021. At the same time, he had more than 1.2 million Spotify listeners. In December 2021, Dhillon's written duet song "What Ve" was released, sung by Diljit Dosanjh and Nimrat Khaira. In December, Dhillon announced his debut concert tour "Destiny Tour Canada" (2022) alongside Nimrat Khaira via his Instagram story.

=== 2022: Destiny Tour and Jalwa ===
In February 2022, Nimrat Khaira's album Nimmo was released, for which Dhillon served as lyricist in 7 songs and also the co-singer on the song "Ki Karde Je". "Ki Karde Je" was the first duet song performed by Arjan Dhillon, and it also charted at No. 36 on UK Asian music charts. In March 2022, he released his new single track "Jawani", which is the most streamed song of Arjan Dhillon on Spotify with more than 20 million streams.

In April 2022, Arjan Dhillon embarked on his debut concert tour "Destiny Tour Canada" alongside Nimrat Khaira. During the Tour, they performed in five different cities of Canada. In April 2022, he released his new single track "Setting"; it was followed by two other single tracks "Thabba Ku Zulfan" on 12 May, and "Nakhre" on 11 July. Following this, Arjan also announced Destiny Tour Australia and New Zealand with Nimrat Khaira. It began on 6 August 2022 in Perth and continued until 7 September 2022 with its final destination scheduled in Canberra, Australia.

In August 2022, he released a duet song "Photo" with Nimrat Khaira. On 24 August 2022, Dhillon released the music video of his Awara album's song "Mandeer". One week later, he released his new single track "Panjab Warga". On 13 October 2022, Arjan Dhillon released the cover of his second studio album Jalwa on Instagram and, announced that the album would be released on 17 October 2022. Jalwa included 12 solo songs, which were released altogether on 17 October. The album charted at No. 9 on Spotify Top Albums Debut Global, at No. 3 on Spotify Top Albums India, at No. 2 on Apple Music Top Indian Albums, and at 2 on Apple Music Top Canadian Albums. On 17 October 2022, first music video of the song "25-25" was released, while the song charted at 28 on UK Asian music chart, and at 19 on the UK Punjabi music chart. On 31 October 2022, he released the music video of the song "It's My Time". Dhillon released the song "Said & Done", with Qarn Mallhi in October 2026. The song also featured production from MixedbyAli.

== Discography ==
Year	Album / EP	Record label	No. of tracks	Music	Format
2026	Enigma	Panj-Aab Records	12	Mxrci, Arsh Heer, Jay Trak	Digital download, streaming
2025	A for Arjan 2	Panj-Aab Records	11	Mxrci, Arsh Heer, The Culprit, Opi Music	Digital download, streaming
2025	Shikhar	Brown Studios	10	Various	Digital download, streaming
2025	The Revolution (EP)	Panj-Aab Records	6	Mxrci	Digital download, streaming
2024	Patander	Brown Studios	12	Mxrci	Digital download, streaming
2024	Chobar	Brown Studios	10	Mxrci	Digital download, streaming
2024	Manifest (EP, with Mxrci)	Panj-Aab Records	5	Mxrci	Digital download, streaming
2023	Saroor	Panj-Aab Records	15	Mxrci, The Kidd, Preet Hundal	Digital download, streaming
2022	A for Arjan	Brown Studios	13	Mxrci, The Kidd, Arsh Heer, Jay B Singh, Opi Music, Yeah Proof	Digital download, streaming
2022	Jalwa	Brown Studios	12	Mxrci, The Kidd, Preet Hundal, Jay B Singh, Desi Crew, Yeah Proof	Digital download, streaming
2021	Awara	Brown Studios	13	Yeah Proof, Mxrci, Arsh Heer, Desi Crew, J Statik, Jay B Singh	Digital download, streaming
2021	Gutt (EP)	Brown Studios	6	Mxrci, Desi Crew	Digital download, streaming
2021	Vatt Da Raula (EP)	Brown Studios	5	Desi Crew	Digital download, streaming
2020	The Future: Volume 1 (EP)	Brown Studios	6	The Kidd, Mxrci	Digital download, streaming

== Singles ==
Title	Year	Peak chart positions		Music	Album
Title	Year	UK Asian	UK Punjabi	Music	Album
"Ishq Jeha Ho Gya"	2018	—	—	Preet Hundal	Afsar (soundtrack)
"Shera Samb Lai"	2019	—	—	The Kidd	Non-album singles
"Jatt Di Janeman"	2020	—	—	The Kidd	Non-album singles
"Uber"	2020	—	—	Preet Hundal	Non-album singles
"Bai Bai"	2020	—	—	Mxrci	Non-album singles
"My Fellas"	2020	—	—	Preet Hundal	Non-album singles
"Kala Jaadu" (featuring Yung Delic)	2020	—	—	Mxrci	Non-album singles
"Mull Pyar Da"	2020	—	—	Jay B Singh	Non-album singles
"Daaru Sasti"	2020	—	—	The Kidd	The Future: Volume 1 (EP)
"Jatt Disde"	2020	—	—	The Kidd	The Future: Volume 1 (EP)
"Badmashi"	2020	—	—	Mxrci	The Future: Volume 1 (EP)
"Kath"	2020	—	—	Mxrci	The Future: Volume 1 (EP)
"Panjab Kithe Dabda"	2020	—	—	Mxrci	
"Soorme Aoun Tareeka Te"	2020	—	—	Desi Crew	
"Likhari"	2021	—	—	Mxrci	
"Jutti"	2021	—	—	Mxrci	
"Gutt"	2021	—	—	Mxrci	Gutt
"Ki Pta"	2021	—	—	Yeah Proof	
"Jaagde Raho"	2021	—	—	Desi Crew	
"Begani Raat"	2021	—	—	The Kidd	Gutt
Downtown	2021				Gutt
2 BHK	2021				Gutt
"Pindan De Naa"	2021	—	—	Bling Singh	
"Pehli Peshi"	2021	—	—	J Statik	
"My Rulez"	2021	—	—	Yeah Proof	
"Jaan"	2021	—	—		
"Kalli Sohni"	2021	—	—	Yeah Proof	
"Vatt Da Raula"	2021	—	—	Desi Crew	Vatt Da Raula
Buckle (with Gurlez Akhtar)	2021			Desi Crew	Vatt Da Raula
"Score"	2021	—	—	Arsh Heer	Awara
"Shamma Payiaan"	2021	—	—	Yeah Proof	Awara
"Fire Fur"	2021			Mxrci	Awara
"Hold On"	2021			Desi Crew	Awara
"Mandeer"	2021	—	—	J Statik	Awara
"Danabaad"	2021	—	—	Yeah Proof	Awara
"Votaan"	2022	—	—	Mxrci	
"Jawani"	2022	—	—	Mxrci	
Nabzan	2022				
"Setting"	2022	—	—	Desi Crew	
"Thabba Ku Zulfan" (Tribute to Shiv Kumar Batalvi)	2022	—	—	Yeah Proof	
"Nakhre"	2022	—	—	Mxrci	
"Photo" (with Nimrat Khaira)	2022	—	—	Preet Hundal	
"Panjab Warga"	2022	—	—	Jay B Singh	
"25-25"	2022	28	19	Mxrci	Jalwa
"It's My Time"	2022	—	—	Mxrci	Jalwa
"Hazur"	2022	—	—	Mxrci	Jalwa
"Hommie Call"	2022	—	—	Desi Crew	Jalwa
"Munde Pinda De"	2022	—	—	The Kidd	Jalwa
"Drunk Arjan"	2022	—	—	Jay B	Jalwa
"Maharani Jinda"	2022	—	—	Preet Hundal	Jalwa
"Trucker"	2022	—	—	Preet Hundal	Non-album single
"Milde"	2022	—	—	Mxrci	A for Arjan
"Please"	2022	—	—	Mxrci	A for Arjan
"More Beautiful"	2022	—	—	Mxrci	A for Arjan
"Heer"	2022	—	—	Mxrci	A for Arjan
"Salute"	2023	40	—	Mxrci	
"Old Me"	2023	—	—	Mxrci	
"65 Inch Ghodian"	2023	—	—	Mxrci	
"Night Out"	2023	—	—	Mxrci	
"Raah Warga"	2023	—	—	Jay B Singh	
"Munda Nahi Bolda"	2023	—	—	Mxrci	
"Panjab Intro – Saroor"	2023	—	—	Mxrci	Saroor
"Ilzaam"	2023	26	—	Mxrci	Saroor
"Long Back"	2023	—	—	Mxrci	Saroor
"Worldwide"	2023	—	—	Mxrci	Saroor
Jaan Vaariye	2023	—	—	The Kidd	Saroor
"Same Like Me"	2023	—	—	Mxrci	
"Lip Shade"	2023	—	—	Mxrci	
"Custom Plates" (with Mxrci)	2023	—	—	Mxrci	Mxrci Season
"Flat"	2023	—		Yeah Proof	
"Ghar Bharte"	2023			Mxrci	
"No Debts"	2023			Mxrci	
"Chah Pindan Di"	2023			Mxrci	
"Glorious"	2024	39	—	Mxrci	Chobar
"Suits You"	2024			Mxrci	Chobar
"Hot Shit"	2024	32	—	Mxrci	Chobar
"Kuz Saal"	2024			Mxrci	Chobar
"Fly" (with Mxrci)	2024			Mxrci	Manifest
"Chidi Udd" (with Mxrci)	2024			Mxrci	
"Je Jatt Vigad Geya"	2024			Mxrci	
"Air Hostess"	2024			Mxrci	
"Ok Hoye Paye Haan"	2025	—	—	Mxrci	
"Smooth"	2025	—	—	Mxrci	Badnaam
Gears	2025			Mxrci	The Revolution
Jindey	2025			Mxrci	
Kikran De Phull	2025			Mxrci	
Pyar diyaan Gallan	2025			Mxrci	
Ki Kariye	2025			Mxrci	A For Arjan 2
Kavita	2025				Shikhar
Bulle	2025			Mxrci	
Kahli Aa	2025			Mxrci	

== Tours ==
- Destiny Tour Canada (with Nimrat Khaira) (April 2022)
- Destiny Tour Australia - New Zealand (with Nimrat Khaira) (2022)
