= Jaggi Singh (actor) =

Indian actor and film producer

- Born: Jagpreet Singh
- Occupation: Actor
- Years active: 2012–2019
- Website: http://www.jaggisingh.com/

Jagpreet Singh commonly known as Jaggi Singh is an Indian actor and film producer. Jaggi known for his role in Punjabi film Faraar as Kaptaan. His role in Faraar earned him the recognition as a future villain of Punjabi Cinema. He made his acting debut in 2012 movie, Mirza The Untold Story and which he followed with Hero Naam Yaad Rakhi, Faraar, Manje Bistre
