= Shava Ni Girdhari Lal =

2021 Indian Punjabi-language comedy film

- First look poster
- Directed by: Gippy Grewal
- Screenplay by: Gippy Grewal; Rana Ranbir
- Story by: Rana Ranbir
- Produced by: Gippy Grewal; Vashu Bhagnani; Ashu Munish Sahani
- Starring: Gippy Grewal; Neeru Bajwa; Yami Gautam; Himanshi Khurana; Surilie Gautam
- Cinematography: Baljit Singh Deo
- Edited by: Rohit Dhiman
- Music by: Jatinder Shah
- Production companies: Humble Motion Pictures; Pooja Entertainment; Omjee Star Studios
- Distributed by: Omjee Group
- Release date: 17 December 2021
- Country: India
- Language: Punjabi

Shava Ni Girdhari Lal (transl. Well Done Girdhari Lal) is a 2021 Indian Punjabi-language comedy film directed by Gippy Grewal from a screenplay co-written with Rana Ranbir. Produced by Gippy Grewal, Vashu Bhagnani and Ashu Munish Sahani under the banners of Humble Motion Pictures, Pooja Entertainment and Omjee Star Studios, it stars Gippy Grewal, Neeru Bajwa, and Himanshi Khurana. Yami Gautam also stars in film marking her comeback in Punjabi film industry after 10 years. The film is a period comedy and the plot is set in the 1940s. The principal photography of the film began on 3 April 2021, and it was theatrically released on 17 December 2021.

== Cast ==
- Gippy Grewal as Girdhari Lal (Magghar Singh Sandhu)
- Neeru Bajwa as Shamo
- Himanshi Khurana as Surjeet Kaur
- Payal Rajput as Kammo
- Sara Gurpal as Jinder
- Yami Gautam as Mannat
- Surilie Gautam as Bhaggo
- Prabh Grewal
- Tanu Grewal as Kuljeet
- Karamjit Anmol as Jaggar Singh
- Rana Ranbir
- Seema Kaushal
- Sardar Sohi
- Raghveer Boli
- Prince Kanwaljit Singh
- Akshita Sharma
- Raj Dhaliwal as Parsinni
- Chandan Gill
- Baljinder Kaur
- Balwinder Begowal
- Ranjit Punia
- Harinder Bhullar
- Dilraj Udey
- Honey Mattu
- Aman Kotish
- Nisha Bano
- Nooran Kaur

== Production ==
Vashu Bhagnani is a co-producer of the film, it is his first Punjabi film as producer. 52 popular actors from Punjabi film industry are cast in one film for the first time.

Principal photography of the film started on 3 April 2021.

== Release and reception ==
The film was released theatrically on 17 December 2021.

=== Critical response ===
Kiddaan.com gave the film 2.5 stars out of 5 and praised the performances of cast. They didn't appreciate the theme and ending of the film and stated, "We believe this movie could have been a great watch if the makers would have tried to keep the theme of the movie specific." Concluding they said, "we are ending this review with a very straight forward and not honey-coated conclusion that you might like the movie only if you are a hard-core Gippy Grewal fan."

== Soundtrack ==
Shava Ni Girdhari Lal

Soundtrack album by Jatinder Shah
- Released: 2021
- Genre: Feature film soundtrack
- Language: Punjabi
- Label: Humble Music

Jatinder Shah chronology
Paani Ch Madhaani (2021)	Shava Ni Girdhari Lal (2021)	Phatte Dinde Chakk Punjabi (2022)

The full soundtrack of the film is composed by Jatinder Shah with lyrics by Happy Raikoti, Kumaar, Amrit Maan, Satinder Sartaaj, Ricky Khan. The songs are sung by Gippy Grewal, Sunidhi Chauhan, Satinder Sartaaj, Amrit Maan and G Khan. Title track "Shava Ni Girdhari Lal" was released on 5 December 2021. Second track "Gori Diyan Jhanjhran" sung by Sunidhi Chauhan was released on 8 December 2021.

=== Track list ===
No.	Title	Lyrics	Singer(s)	Length
1.	"Shava Ni Girdhari Lal"	Satinder Sartaaj	Satinder Sartaaj	2:42
2.	"Gori Diyan Jhanjhran"	Kumaar	Sunidhi Chauhan	2:40
3.	"Kuljeete"	Veet Baljit	Gippy Grewal	3:11
4.	"Jatt Nal Yaariyan"	Happy Raikoti	Kamal Khan	3:31
5.	"Moge Di Barfi"	Amrit Maan	Amrit Maan	2:55
6.	"Fateh"	Ricky Khan	G Khan	2:40
7.	"Sawa Sawa Lakh"	Veet Baljit	Gippy Grewal	3:30
