= Afsar (2018 film) =

- Theatrical release poster
- Punjabi: ਅਫ਼ਸਰ
- Directed by: Gulshan Singh
- Written by: Jatinder Lall; Jass Grewal
- Produced by: Amiek Virk & Manpreet Johal
- Starring: Tarsem Jassar; Nimrat Khaira; Gurpreet Ghuggi; Karamjit Anmol
- Narrated by: Yogesh Grover
- Cinematography: Pradeep Khanvilkar
- Edited by: Manish More
- Music by: Gurcharan Singh
- Production companies: Nadar Films; Vehli Janta Films
- Distributed by: Omjee Group
- Release date: 5 October 2018 (India)
- Country: India
- Language: Punjabi

Afsar (transl. Officer) is a 2018 Indian Punjabi film directed by Gulshan Singh, starring Tarsem Jassar, Nimrat Khaira, Gurpreet Ghuggi and Karamjit Anmol. The film is based on the concept that Kanungo is a higher post than Patwari, but higher respect is given to the Patwari rather than Kanungo. The film is produced by Amiek Virk & Manpreet Johal. It was debut film for director Gulshan Singh and the debut in a lead role for Nimrat Khaira.

Released theatrically on 5 October 2018, the romantic comedy received good reviews from the public but mixed reviews from critics. Commercially, the film opened well and earned more than ₹5.72 crore in its opening weekend worldwide.

== Synopsis ==
Jaspal Singh (Tarsem Jassar), an honest person, is appointed as a Kanungo (a Revenue Inspector, under whom five Patwaris or agricultural land clerks work). Therefore, Kashmiro Taayi (Gurpreet Kaur Bhangu), a well wisher and senior lady from his village, wants him to marry her niece, Harman (Nimrat Khaira), who is a teacher in a government school and wants to marry someone in a government job.

Bharpur Singh (Karamjit Anmol), who is a corrupt Patwari (agricultural land clerk) from Harman's village, also has his eye on Harman. When he approaches Harman's drunkard and illiterate father regarding his land, he lies and informs him that a Patwari post is higher and richer than that of Kanungo, and therefore the father should have Harman marry Bharpur. So when Jaspal and his family approach Harman's family for her hand, Harman's father refuses them, even though everyone, including Harman, likes Jaspal. As Jaspal is leaving, Harman advises him to work hard and get a post of Patwari so that her father will accept him, to which Jaspal replies that hard work leads to promotion and not demotion, so how can he become a junior official when he is a senior official?

As Jaspal is leaving in his car, another Jaspal Singh (Ravinder Mand), who has recently got the post of Patwari after his father's death, asks him for lift, as his scooter has broken down. On their way, Patwari Jaspal tells Kanungo Jaspal that he does not like this government job and prefers lying idle and getting drunk, provided he gets some easy money. Looking at this great opportunity, Kanungo Jaspal gives money to Patwari Jaspal and tells him to go away somewhere and that he will take his place as the new Patwari, as their names are the same and no one knows them in that village.

Kanungo Jaspal makes a fake ID card and, with the document from Patwari, Jaspal reports to Harman's village as the new Patwari, after getting Patwari Bharpur Singh transferred through his best friend's uncle, who is a politician. The film unfolds from there.

== Cast ==
- Tarsem Jassar as Jaspal Singh
- Nimrat Khaira as Harman
- Karamjit Anmol as Bharpur Singh Patwari
- Pukhraj Bhalla as Honey (Jaspal's friend)
- Gurpreet Kaur Bhangu as Kashmiro Taayi (Aunt)
- Ravinder Mand as Patwari Jaspal
- Hardip Gill as Jeewan- Harman's father (Hardeep Gill)
- Seema Kaushal as Harman's Mother
- Malkeet Rauni as Harman's Uncle
- Tarsem Paul as Jaspal's father
- Ramniq Sandhu as Jaspal's mother
- Nirmal Rishi as Sarpanchni (Village Elder)
- Gurpreet Ghuggi as Joga Singh
- Rana Jung Bahadur as Jaila
- Vijay Tandon as Lala Daulat Ram
- Parkash Gadhu as Heera
- Prince Kanwaljit Singh
- Honey Mattu as 'Kala'

== Soundtrack ==
Afsar

Soundtrack album by Preet Hundal R Guru & Jaidev Kumar
- Released: September 2018
- Recorded: 2017–18
- Genre: Feature film soundtrack
- Length: 19:41
- Language: Punjabi
- Label: White Hill Music

The soundtrack of Afsar was composed by Jaidev Kumar, Preet Hundal and R Guru, whereas the background score was composed by Gurcharan Singh. Afsar features the vocals from Tarsem Jassar, Nimrat Khaira, Arjan Dhillon and Ranjit Bawa, whereas lyrics were written by Tarsem Jassar, Arjan Dhillon, Harmanjeet and Gurbinder Mann. Music rights of the film were sold to White Hill Studios.

=== Track list ===
No.	Title	Lyrics	Music	Singer(s)	Length
1.	"Sun Sohniye"	Arjan Dhillon	Jaidev Kumar	Ranjit Bawa, Nimrat Khaira	2:38
2.	"Kanungo"	Gurbinder Mann	Preet Hundal	Karamjit Anmol	1:52
3.	"Ishq Jeha Ho Gya"	Arjan Dhillon	Preet Hundal	Arjan Dhillon	4:26
4.	"Udhaar Chalda"	Arjan Dhillon	Preet Hundal	Nimrat Khaira, Gurnam Bhullar	4:19
5.	"Khat"	Arjan Dhillon	Preet Hundal	Nimrat Khaira	3:26
6.	"Kheen Khaab"	Tarsem Jassar	R Guru	Tarsem Jassar	3:00
7.	"Farda"	Tarsem Jassar	R Guru	Tarsem Jassar	3:58
Total length:					19:41

== Reception ==
Afsar had grossed ₹2.17 crore in Canada and ₹39.65 lacs in the United States.
