= Champions of the Golden Valley =

- Directed by: Ben Sturgulewski
- Release date: 2024
- Country: United States

Champions of the Golden Valley is a 2024 American documentary film by director Ben Sturgulewski about Afghan skier Alishah Farhang. Arian Moayed and Malala Yousafzai are executive producers. The film premiered at the 2024 Tribeca Festival.
