= 2025 Emmy Awards =

2025 Emmy Awards may refer to:

- 3rd Children's and Family Emmy Awards, honoring children's and family-oriented television programming between June 2023 and May 2024, held on March 15, 2025, marking a permanent move for these awards from December to March.
- 46th Sports Emmy Awards, honoring sports programming, held on May 20, 2025.
- 46th News and Documentary Emmy Awards, honoring American news and documentary programming in 2024, held on June 25–26, 2025, marking a permanent move for these awards from fall to summer.
- 77th Primetime Emmy Awards, honoring primetime programming between June 2024 and May 2025, held on September 14, 2025.
  - 77th Primetime Creative Arts Emmy Awards, the separate Primetime Emmys ceremony to honor artistic and technical achievements in primetime programming between June 2024 and May 2025, held on September 6–7, 2025.
- 52nd Daytime Emmy Awards, honoring daytime programming in 2024, held October 17, 2025, marking a permanent move for these awards from spring to fall.
  - 52nd Daytime Creative Arts & Lifestyle Emmy Awards, the Daytime Emmy Award categories honoring artistic and technical achievements in daytime programming in 2024, were presented on the same night of October 17, 2025.
- 53rd International Emmy Awards, honoring international programming in 2024, held on November 24, 2025.

Preceded by 2024	Emmy Awards; 2025	Succeeded by 2026
