= Nimrat Khaira =

Indian singer and actress (born 1992)

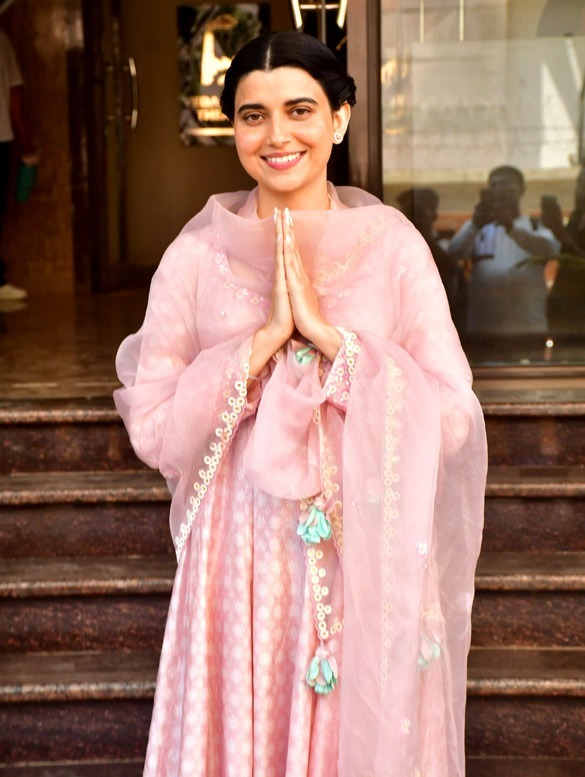
- Born: Nimratpal Kaur Khaira; 8 August 1992 (age 34); Batala, Punjab, India
- Occupations: Singer; actress
- Years active: (2014–present)
- Musical career
- Genre: Punjabi
- Instruments: Vocals; guitar
- Labels: Brown Studios; Panj-aab; Speed Records; White Hill; Rhythm Boyz; Brand B; Worldwide Records Punjabi; GEET MP3

Nimratpal Kaur Khaira (born 8 August 1992), known professionally as Nimrat Khaira, is an Indian singer and actress known for her work in Punjabi-language music and films. She started her singing career with the songs "Rabb Karke" and "SP De Rank Wargi" and debuted as an actress in 2017 with Lahoriye.

== Career ==
Khaira won the third season of the reality television series Voice of Punjab in 2012.

She started her singing career from a duet song "Rab Karke" with Nishawn Bhullar, which was released on 24 September 2015 by record label Punjaab Records. The song received good response from audience, but she received much attention through her next two songs "Ishq Kacheri" and "SP De Rank Wargi", both released in 2016. She gained fame after the release of "Ishq Kacheri". She continued her success with songs like "Salute Wajde" in 2016. In the same year, she performed at Saras Mela, held in Bathinda, and hosted the third edition of Radio Mirchi Music Awards, which were held the following year. In 2017, she launched many hit singles, such as "Rohab Rakhdi", "Dubai Wale Sheikh", "Suit" and "Designer". She also won Best Female Vocalist award for her duo "Dubai Wale Sheikh" from Manje Bistre at Brit Asia Awards and nominated for a Filmfare Punjabi Award. The song also peaked on UK Asian chart. Her single "Suit" entered top 20 in the chart.

Her song "Designer", produced by Deep Jandu, garnered controversy after a foreign composer, Zwirek, claimed the music was plagiarised from his song, which led to the removal of the song from YouTube. Later, the song was re-added to YouTube, after the composition was proved legally original.

=== Film career ===
She started her film career in 2017 with Lahoriye, wherein she played the role of Kikkar's sister Harleen Kaur. She was nominated for Best Debut Performance and Best Supporting Actress at BritAsia Music & Film Awards.

Her second film, Afsar, released on 5 October 2018. The film marked her debut as a lead actress, where Khaira shared screen with Tarsem Jassar. She played the role of Harman, a teacher in a government school.

She starred alongside Ammy Virk and Sargun Mehta in Amberdeep Singh's Saunkan Saunkne, which released in 2022. Her film Jodi, which was written and directed by Amberdeep Singh, was released in 2023. In the film, she starred opposite Diljit Dosanjh. It was her second collaboration with Singh and Rhythm Boyz Entertainment after Lahoriye (2017).

Khaira faced strong opposition in Punjab over the film Akaal: The Unconquered, along with Gippy Grewal. Several Sikh organisations protested against the film, claiming that the film distorted Sikh history and that the film shows several Sikh characters consuming meat and alcohol, which goes against Sikh religious beliefs; several screenings of the film were cancelled at various locations.

In 2025, she appeared in the film Sarbala Ji directed by Mandeep Kumar and in Saunkan Saunkanay 2, directed by Smeep Kang.

== Discography ==
=== Albums ===
Albums as lead artist, showing year released
| Title | Album details | Lyricist |
|---|---|---|
| Nimmo | Released: 2022; Music : Desi Crew, Yeah Proof, J Statik, Arsh Heer; Tracks : 10; Label: Speed Records; Format: Digital download, streaming | Arjan Dhillon, Gifty, Bachan Bedill |

=== Singles ===
List of singles as lead artist, showing year released and album name
| Title | Year | Peak chart position | Music | Lyricist | Album |
| Title | Year | UK Asian | Music | Lyricist | Album |
|---|---|---|---|---|---|
| "Rab Karke" (with Nishawn Bhullar) | 2015 | | Rupin Kahlon | Jass Chahal | |
| "SP De Rank Wargi" | 2016 | | Desi Crew | Narinder Baath | |
| "Ishq Kacheri" | 2016 | | Preet Hundal | Preet Hundal | |
| "Salute Wajde" | 2016 | | Deep Jandu | Harf Cheema | |
| "Taanvi Changa Lagda" | 2016 | | Gold Boy | Babbu | |
| "Rohab Rakhdi" | 2017 | | Preet Hundal | Bittu Cheema | |
| "Jhumke" (with Jassi Gill & Babbal Rai) | 2017 | | Jay K | Veet Baljeet | Sargi |
| "Dubai Wale Sheikh" (with Gippy Grewal) | 2017 | | Jay K | Happy Raikoti | Manje Bistre |
| "DJ Waaleya" | 2017 | | Jay K | Dalvir Sarobad | |
| "Akhar" (with Amrinder Gill) | 2017 | | Jatinder Shah | Surinder Saadhpuri | Lahoriye |
| "Bhangra Gidha" | 2017 | | Desi Crew | Babbu | |
| "Suit" (featuring Mankirt Aulakh) | 2017 | 4 | Preet Hundal | Arjan Dhillon | |
| "Designer" | 2017 | | Deep Jandu | Happy Raikoti | |
| "Brober Boli" | 2018 | | DesiRoutz | Maninder Kailey | |
| "Ranihaar" | 2018 | | Preet Hundal | Arjan Dhillon, Prince Bhullar | |
| "Sun Sohniye" (with Ranjit Bawa) | 2018 | | Jaidev Kumar | Arjan Dhillon | Afsar |
| "Udhaar Chalda" (with Gurnam Bhullar) | 2018 | | Preet Hundal | Arjan Dhillon | Afsar |
| "Khat" | 2018 | | Preet Hundal | Arjan Dhillon | Afsar |
| "Ravaya Na Kar" | 2018 | | Preet Hundal | Arjan Dhillon | Afsar |
| "Sacha Jhootha" | 2018 | | Preet Hundal | Shah Ali | |
| "Tohar" | 2019 | | Preet Hundal | Arjan Dhillon | |
| "Jattan De Munde" (with Tarsem Jassar) | 2019 | | Desi Crew | Tarseem Jassar | Rabb Da Radio 2 |
| "Channan" | 2019 | | Desi Crew | Taseem Jassar | Rabb Da Radio 2 |
| "Baddlan De Kaalje" (with Amrinder Gill) | 2019 | | Dr Zeus | Bunty Bains | Chal Mera Putt |
| "Supna Laavan Da" | 2019 | | Preet Hundal | Gifty | |
| "Lehnga" | 2020 | | The Kidd | Arjan Dhillon | |
| "Majhe Wal Da" (with Amrinder Gill) | 2020 | | Desi Crew | Laddi Chahal | Chal Mera Putt 2 |
| "Ajj Kal Ajj Kal" | 2020 | | Desi Crew | Bunty Bains | |
| "Vail" (with Mankirt Aulakh) | 2020 | | Avvy Sra | Shree Brar | |
| "Sohne Sohne Suit" | 2020 | | Rox- A | Farmaan | |
| "Track Suit" (with Diljit Dosanjh) | 2020 | | Desi Crew | Laddi Chahal | G.O.A.T. |
| "Lemme Check" | 2020 | | Rox A | Babbu | |
| "Sangdi Sangdi" (with Tarsem Jassar) | 2020 | | MixSingh | Tarseem Jassar | My Pride |
| "Busy Busy" | 2020 | | Pendu Boyz | D Harp | |
| "Blink" | 2020 | | Desi Crew | Bunty Bains | |
| "Time Chakda" | 2020 | | Desi Crew | Rony Ajnali, Gill Machrai | |
| Gulabi Rang | 2020 | 32 | Desi Crew | Mandeep Maavi | |
| "Sira E Hou" (with Amrit Maan) | 2021 | 4 | Desi Crew | Amrit Maan | All Bamb |
| "Jaan" | 2021 | | Arsh Heer | Gifty | |
| "What Ve" (with Diljit Dosanjh) | 2021 | | Desi Crew | Arjan Dhillon | |
| "Challa" | 2022 | | Desi Crew | Arjan Dhillon | Nimmo |
| "Ki Karde Je" (with Arjan Dhillon) | 2022 | | Desi Crew | Arjan Dhillon | Nimmo |

== Filmography ==
Key
| † | Denotes films that have not yet been released |

| Year | Film(s) | Role | Director | Notes |
|---|---|---|---|---|
| 2017 | Lahoriye | Harleen Kaur | Amberdeep Singh | Punjabi film Debut |
| 2018 | Afsar | Harman | Gulshan Singh | |
| 2021 | Teeja Punjab | Mohni | Amberdeep Singh | |
| 2022 | Saunkan Saunkne | Kirna | Amarjeet Singh Saraon | |
| 2023 | Jodi | Kamaljot | Amberdeep Singh | |
| 2025 | Saunkan Saunkanay 2 | Kiranjit Kaur | Smeep Kang | |
| 2025 | Sarbala Ji | Pyaaro | Mandeep Kumar | |
| 2025 | Akaal: The Unconquered | Sahej Kaur | Gippy Grewal | |
| 2026 | Viyaah Kartaare Da | | Smeep Kang | |
| 2026 | Rabb Da Radio 3 | Sift | Harry Bhatti, Harkirat Pal Singh | |

== Awards and nominations ==
| Year | Film | Award Ceremony | Category | Result |
|---|---|---|---|---|
| 2018 | Lahoriye | Brit Asia Awards | Best Debut Performance | Nominated |
| 2018 | Lahoriye | Brit Asia Awards | Best Supporting Actress | Nominated |
| 2018 | Manje Bistre | Brit Asia Awards | Best Female Vocalist | Won |
| 2018 | Manje Bistre | Filmfare Awards Punjabi | Best Playback Singer (Female) | Nominated |
| 2018 | Lahoriye | Filmfare Awards Punjabi | Best Debut Female | Nominated |
| 2018 | Lahoriye | PTC Punjabi Film Awards | Best Debut Female | Nominated |
| 2019 | Afsar | Brit Asia TV Awards | Best Female Playback Vocalist | Nominated |
| 2022 | Teeja Panjab | PTC Panjabi Film Awards | Best Female Actress | Won |
