= EcoSikh =

Sikh environmental organization

- Formation: 2009
- Type: Environmental organization
- Headquarters: 2621 University Boulevard West, Silver Spring, MD 20902 (U.S. Office); 94, Block E, Bhai Randhir Singh Nagar, Ludhiana, Punjab 141012 (Indian Office)
- Key people: Rajwant Singh
- Website: ecosikh.org

EcoSikh is a Sikh environmental organization. It is the most prominent Sikh environmental organization working on global environmental issues. It has been one of the foremost organizations promoting Sikhism as a "green" religion. Using Bron Taylor's framework of green religion, EcoSikh can be understood as positioning environmentally conscious behavior, such as planting trees, as religious obligation grounded in the principle of Sevā or selfless service.

== History ==
=== Background ===
Antecedents of Sikh forays into environmentalism can be found within the Guru Granth Sahib itself. The second shloka of the Japji Sahib of Guru Nanak stresses on the importance of living in-harmony with nature. Furthermore, Guru Har Rai taught that the environment should be cared for by Sikhs. The sarbat da bhala philosophy of Sikhs calls upon them to promote the well-being of all.

Some earlier Sikh organizations and movements that delved into environmental efforts include Pingalwara, established by Bhagat Puran Singh, whom had pro-environmental inclinations. Balbir Singh Seechewal of the Nirmala sect, spearheaded the movement to clean-up the Kali Bein rivulet in the year 2000 and also raised awareness on the condition of the Buddha Nullah. Sewa Singh, director of the Nishan-e-Sikhi Charitable Trust based in Khadur Sahib, supervised the distribution and planting of hundreds of thousands of tree saplings, including along the roadways of Khadur Sahib.

=== Establishment ===
EcoSikh was established in 2009 through a partnership with the Sikh Council on Religion and Education (SCORE). The establishment of the organization was influenced by the United Nations Development Programme and the Alliance of Religions and Conservation initiatives. The founder of EcoSikh is Rajwant Singh, who is the Global President.

=== Activities ===
EcoSikh primarily operates in the Indian state of Punjab but also conducts global projects. EcoSikh is working towards the "greening" of gurdwaras by reducing disposable wastage in the langar halls by introducing environmentally-friendly alternatives. Furthermore, they are working toward the "greening" of the areas in-vicinity to the Golden Temple in Amritsar. Other activities of EcoSikh include general cleanup drives, solar panel installations, and seminar events. EcoSikh aims to change individual Sikh attitudes and behaviours toward the environment, and the promotion of a healthy eco-friendly environment surrounding gurdwara complexes.

Since 2013, EcoAmritsar, an initiative of EcoSikh based in Amritsar, has been providing instruction on the organization of green nagar kirtans, such as by recommending the usage of usage and collection of biodegradable plates and cutlery made from leaves and the serving of organic-based langars.

EcoSikh reportedly was involved in over 1,500 activities in the year 2013.

In 2013, a painting by Rahi Mohinder Singh was gifted to EcoSikh which depicts Guru Har Rai giving a tree to a petitioner to plant, however the tree species portrayed in the painting is an eucalyptus, a non-native species that was not found during the lifetime of Guru Har Rai, making the painting anachronistic.

In May 2017, the EcoSikh proposed the establishment of a 100-acre "sacred forest" around the shrine of Gurdwara Darbar Sahib in Kartarpur, Pakistan to celebrate the then upcoming 550th Guru Nanak Gurpurab celebrations slated for 2019. Rajwant Singh, president of EcoSikh, also expressed dreams of developing the site as an eco-tourism hub, alongside the sacred forest proposal. EcoSikh also suggested a botanical garden could be established at Kartarpur instead of a sacred forest. Alongside the sacred forest suggestion, it was proposed that efforts covering organic farming, install a solar panel installation, dedicated forest areas, amid others, should be considered for Kartarpur. The Guru Nanak Sacred Forests mission of EcoSikh was launched in 2019.

EcoSikh also operates a branch in Canada, known as 'EcoSikh Canada'. In 2019, EcoSikh Canada planted hundreds of trees in the areas of Brampton and Scarborough, Ontario. 550 trees were specifically planted in the city of Brampton to celebrate the 550th Guru Nanak Gurpurab celebration. This was followed by another 550 trees planted in Scarborough. Roop Sidhu, founder of the Canadian chapter of EcoSikh, claimed that EcoSikh had planted 10,000 trees across Canada by 12 November 2019 and further plan to have planted 55,000 trees across Canada by 2021.

Aside from Punjab, EcoSikh has also planted trees in other Indian states and regions, such as Haryana, Rajasthan, Delhi, Maharashtra, Gujarat, and in Jammu.

On 14 March 2022 (Sikh Environment Day), EcoSikh planted 1,150 trees in Ireland, 500 trees in Derbyshire, United Kingdom, and 250 trees in Surrey, B.C.

EcoSikh has opened a new segment of industrial forests under Corporate Social Responsibility (CSR), where producers and corporations can lower their carbon footprint with affordable price and minimum land investment.

EcoSikh maintains its own plant nursery at Sajjan Precision Castings, Sahnewal, Punjab, India.

In January 2024, EcoSikh was honoured in the category of 'Sikhs in Charity' at the 12th Sikh Awards, held at Bel-La Monde Hotel in New Delhi. EcoSikh made a commitment to plant 1 million trees by 2025.

EcoSikh currently operates in five countries. EcoSikh has been invited by the White House, the Vatican, the United Nations, and many other international platforms.

==== Sikh Environment Day ====
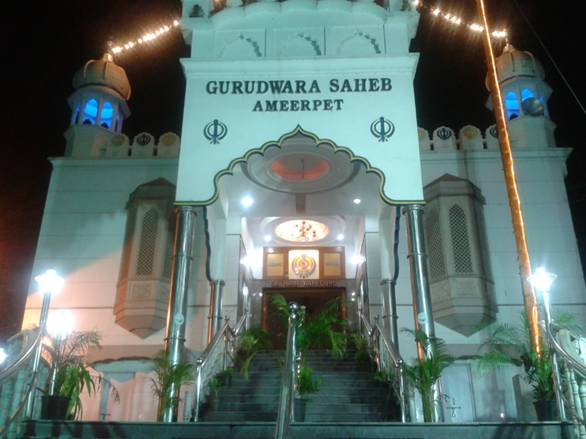
EcoSikh event on Sikh Environment Day 2012 at Gurdwara Ameerpet in Hyderabad. The local congregation brought ornamental plants to the gurdwara's premises.

In 2011, EcoSikh established the celebration of Sikh Environment Day, known in Punjabi as 'Sikh Vatavaran Divas' (Punjabi: Sikha vātāvarana divasa). The 14th of March was the date selected to celebrate Sikh Environment Day because it was the anniversary date of Guru Har Rai's gurgaddi (ascension to the guruship). In 2013, the president of EcoSikh described Guru Har Rai as the "green guru", emphasizing the Sikh guru's close-bond with nature, in a press-release statement. Sikh Environment Day has been adopted by many important gurdwaras, such as Takht Hazur Sahib, one of the Panj Takht, in Nanded. It has also been adopted amongst diasporic Sikh gurdwaras, such as ones located in Pittsburgh and Singapore. In 2013, leaders of all the five takhts of Sikhism formally endorsed Sikh Environment Day. The jathedar of Takht Hazur Sahib promoted tree planting activities to be held on Sikh Environment Day.

==== Guru Nanak Sacred Forests ====
EcoSikh has planted many "mini-forests", composed of native plant species, in the state of Punjab, India using the Japanese Miyawaki methodology, that are named 'Guru Nanak Sacred Forests'. The Guru Nanak Sacred Forests mission was launched in 2019 in-collaboration with Afforestt to coincide with the 550th birth celebrations of Guru Nanak. The ultimate goal for the mission is to plant one million trees using the methods devised by Akira Miyawaki. In-short, the method is distinguished from conventional tree-planting methods in that Miyakawi planting has a much smaller distance between the planted saplings, allowing for the faster maturation of the forest.

EcoSikh claims that its Guru Nanak Sacred Forests are 30 times more dense, have a 10 times higher growth rate, are 100 times more biodiverse, are cost-effective, easily maintainable, and are chemical pesticide-free. EcoSikh project manager for South Asia, Ravneet Singh, explains that the Miyawaki method helps grow dense and native forests through the plantation of dozens of native-species of flora within the same vicinity, after which the forest becomes maintenance-free after a period of three years. The forests provide habitat for wild animals and help improve soil quality of the area. The soil of the forests are extensively mulched to improve the micro-organisms & small animals inhabiting the soil and it assists with regulating the soil temperature. EcoSikh believes every plot of land has the potential of being transformed into a forest.

The steps for establishing a Guru Nanak Sacred Forest are as follows:

- Select a fenced plot that is suitable for plantation with underground and overhead clearance.
- Test the soil for its capacity of water retention, perforation and organic content.
- The required biomass is selected and mixed to stabilise all the above requirements.
- The forest bed is carefully prepped, including levelling of the land.
- Quantification and procurement of indigenous species of the local area is undertaken.
- The native species are distributed and planted following a layered structure as per the Miyawaki method.

Ludhiana district contains a large amount of these sacred forest projects, despite heavy environmental concerns related to pollution in the district. In a low-lying, industrial-area of Ludhiana city, EcoSikh claims that even after water-logging and oil-spill events, 80% of its planted forest's trees survived these environmentally adverse incidents, showing the resilience of the forests.

In 2020, nearly a hundred Guru Nanak Sacred Forests had been planted in Punjab. By 2021, EcoSikh had established over three-hundred Guru Nanak Sacred Forests, primarily in Punjab. These mini-forests are home to 150,000 indigenous species of flora, providing habitat for insect and bird species. Some of the Guru Nanak Sacred Forests are located in urban areas, which are claimed to assist with improving the area's air quality and restoring biodiversity.

By 2024, EcoSikh had planted over 850 forests in Punjab.

By the end of March 2026, EcoSikh has completed plantation of 1580 forests across multiple states in India

==== Guru Granth Sahib Bagh ====
The Guru Granth Sahib Bagh is an initiative of EcoSikh, working in-collaboration with PETALS, regarding the establishment and upkeeping of a garden near the historical Sikh shrine, Gurusar Sahib, located in Moga district. The garden was inaugurated in September 2021 and contains all fifty-eight plant species that find mention by name within the hymns of the Guru Granth Sahib. Each plant is accompanied by a stone with an engraving containing the relevant excerpt from the Sikh scripture mentioning the specie.

==== Naulakha Bagh ====
A traditional Sikh garden located in Kiratpur, known as Naulakha Bagh, was believed to have been founded and cared for by Guru Har Rai during his guruship period. EcoSikh has been involved in a project to restore this garden. EcoSikh is coordinating with other Sikh organizations, such as Shree Ganga Nursery, Shree Ganga Nursery Shiromani Gurdwara Parbandhak Committee (SGPC), and Nishan-e-Sikhi. The project aims to emphasize medicinal plants, which will help revive native, traditional medicinal knowledge.

==== Ek Bageecha ====
EcoSikh has compiled an online anthology titled Eak Bageecha (meaning "one garden") on "green gurbani" compositions that discuss the environment, as found in Sikh scriptures. The title of the anthology references a composition of Guru Arjan which symbolizes the guru as a gardener taking care of mythical plants imbued with the Naam. Thus, this divine gardener serves as a role-model for humanity to recognize the divinity present in all things and to be stewards of them. The anthology contains works praising the natural beauty of the world and that divinity can be found across the Earth's ecosystems, from oceans to deserts.

One of the selected "green gurbani" compositions found in the anthology, authored by Guru Arjan in Raga Asa, is as follows:

There is a garden.
It has so many plants created within it.
And each bears the sweet-nectared Naam as its fruit. ||1||

Consider this, O wise one,
In this garden you may seek the means by which to attain eternal bliss.
O brothers and sisters of Destiny,
This garden has dark pools of poison here and there,
But it also contains the ambrosial nectar within it. ||1||Pause||

There is only one gardener who tends it.
He takes care of every leaf and branch. ||2||
He brought all these plants and planted them there.
They all bear fruit – none is without fruit. ||3||
The one who receives the ambrosial fruit of the Naam
From the Guru – O Nanak,
Such a servant has a way to pass over the ocean of illusion. ||4||5||56||

— Guru Arjan, translated by Albel Singh, Guru Granth Sahib

== People involved ==
- Rajwant Singh – Founder and Global President
- Gunpreet Singh – President
- Rasna Kaur – Executive Director
- Inderpreet Singh – Executive Director
- Manpreet Singh – Secretary
- Bhavdeep Bajaj – Treasurer
- Charan Singh – Convener (Sacred Forests and Sacred Fauna Mission)
- Supreet Kaur – EcoSikh India President
- Pavneet Singh – Head of Operations (India)

== Relation to Sikh principle of Sevā ==
Sevā is one of the principle pillars of the Sikh faith. Sevā denotes selfless service and civic virtue in the organization and in society. In Sikhism, Sevā is defined as voluntary service without expectation of anything in return and for the welfare of others. There are many different types of Sevā which are the following: Sevā rendered through one's body (tan), Sevā rendered through one's mind (man), Sevā rendered through one's wealth (dan). Even though all three modes are equally important, the Sikh Gurus emphasize that all Sevā should be performed without desire (nishkam), without intentions (nishkapat), and with humility (nimarta).

EcoSikh makes it clear that they see their work as a form of sevā. Sevā can be done by reducing carbon footprints, recycling, investing in renewable energies, and being mindful where food comes from.

== International chapters ==
- EcoSikh India
- EcoSikh U.S.A.
- EcoSikh Canada
- EcoSikh U.K.
- EcoSikh Ireland
