= Sudhar =

Gurusar Sudhar Punjabies Indian Gurusar Sadhar
- town
- Country: India
- State: Punjab
- District: Ludhiana
- Named after: 6th Guru Hargobind Saheb Jee

Government
  - Body: Panchayat

Languages
  - Official: Punjabi
- Time zone: UTC+5:30 (IST)
- PIN: 141104
- Telephone code: 01624
- Nearest city: Ludhiana
- Lok Sabha constituency: Fatehgarh sahib
- Vidhan Sabha constituency: Raikot
- Civic agency: Panchayat
- Website: www.gurusarsudhar.org

Gurusar Sudhar is a township in the district of Ludhiana in Punjab, India. It falls in the Raikot sub-division.

== Demographics ==
According to census 2001 it has a population of 5728, of which 3003 are males and 2725 are females. The number of households is 1102.

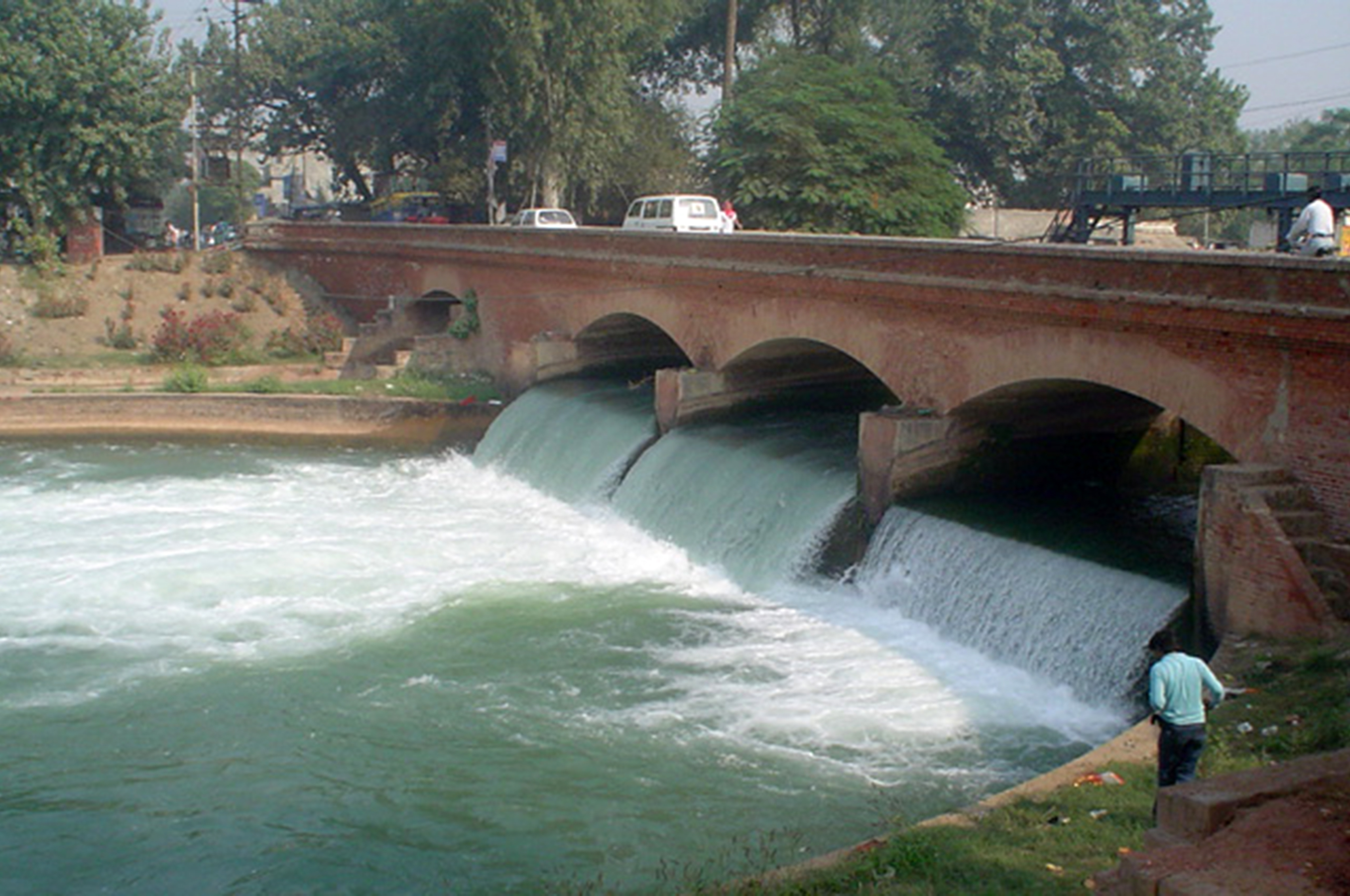
picture of an old bridge over the canal running through Sudhar that has since been dismantled

== Geography ==
Sudhar is divided into the vague and somewhat overlapping areas of Sudhar village, Sudhar Bazaar, Gurusar Sudhar, and Pul Sudhar. It is located nearly at the middle of the road connecting Mullanpur and Raikot; and is flanked by the townships/villages of Halwara, Ghuman, Hissowal, Aitiana, Akalgarh, Rattowal, Toosa, Sidhwan and Bhora. The Abohar Canal, which is a distributary of Satluj rivers and a tributary of Indus river, flows through it.

== Educational institutions ==
The place is home to G.H.G. Khalsa College (since 1948), G.H.G. Khalsa College of Pharmacy (1984), G.H.G. Khalsa College of Education (1955), Khalsa Collegiate Public Senior Secondary School and G.H.G. Khalsa Senior Secondary School which are counted amongst the pioneering institutions of education in rural Punjab. It also has a couple of primary and secondary schools. The two Kendriya Vidyalayas, one Air Force School and Jatindera Greenfield School are well respected schools and attract a large number of students from the region.

== Medical facilities ==
Sudhar is home to Premjit Memorial Government Hospital. It also has a handful of private nursing homes. High end medical care is available in the nearby Ludhiana city.

== Socio-cultural landscape ==
People of several faiths live at Sudhar. Despite the overarching presence of Sikhs and Sikh practices, people of all religions freely practise their faith and extensively intermingle with each other. The place has two Sikh Gurudwaras and a Hindu temple. A church and the tomb of a Muslim peer are present in adjoining Halwara.

Sudhar is known for being the place where Guru Hargobind Sahib, the sixth guru of the Sikhs, gave his shoes to Bhai Jawanda ji for wearing, who kept them as a valued gift. His descendants still have those shoes and people from all over Punjab and India visit Sudhar to see those shoes and seek blessings.

== Notable people ==
- Navv Inder
