= Akalgarh =

Akalgarh may refer to:

- Akalgarh, Ludhiana, Ludhiana district, Punjab, India
- Akalgarh, Phagwara, Kapurthala district, Punjab, India
- Akalgarh, Pakistan
