= K. Deep =

Indian singer (1940–2020)

K. Deep Matharu
- Also known as: Posti
- Born: 10 December 1940; Rangoon, British Burma
- Died: 22 October 2020 (aged 79)
- Genres: Folk, Duets, Comedy
- Occupation: Singer
- Years active: 1969–2020
- Label: His Master's Voice
- Spouse: Jagmohan Kaur (m. 1971–1997)

Kuldeep Singh Matharu (10 December 1940 – 22 October 2020), better known as K. Deep, was an Indian singer of Punjabi-language folk songs and duets. He sang most of the duets with his wife, singer Jagmohan Kaur. The duo is known for their comedy characters Mai Mohno and Posti. Poodna is another notable song by the duo. He was the first to sing songs penned by Shiv Kumar Batalvi. In 2010, he got PTC Life Time Achievement Award, along with Babu Singh Maan, which was presented to him by Punjabi singer Gurdas Maan.

== Early life ==
Deep was born on 10 December 1940 in Rangoon, Burma. His native village is Aitiana in Ludhiana district of Indian Punjab.

He met his wife Jagmohan Kaur in a program in Calcutta and they started working together as a Duo. Later, they got married on 2 February 1971, which was a love marriage. The couple had two children, named Billy and Raja. Raja was very close to both his parents.

== Career ==
He recorded his first LP in 1969 by His Master's Voice and the song was Nashean Naal Yaari, Roli Main Izzat Sari. He was the first to sing Shiv Kumar Batalvi's songs which were later sung by many other Punjabi singers including Jagjit Singh, Nusrat Fateh Ali Khan, Ghulam Ali.

As comedians, they were the first Punjabi duo to record comedy in records, and playing Mai Mohno and Posti, released several records including Posti Canada Vich, Posti England Vich, Nave Puare Pai Gae.
