= Darra (film) =

- Directed by: Parveen Kumar
- Screenplay by: Parveen Kumar
- Story by: Baldev Saraknama
- Produced by: Dalwinder Guraya
- Starring: Gurpreet Ghuggi; Happy Raikoti; Kartar Cheema; Pammi Bai; Shivendra Mahal; Karamjit Anmol; Manveer Rai
- Cinematography: Akram Sheikh
- Edited by: Parminder Virdi
- Music by: Kuljit Singh Studio FMbox 98/9 Centraltown Jalandhar
- Production company: Artha Film Studios
- Distributed by: White Hill Studio
- Release date: 2 September 2016
- Country: India
- Language: Punjabi

Darra is a 2016 Punjabi film directed by Parveen Kumar, produced by Dalwinder Guraya and starring Gurpreet Ghuggi, Manveer Rai, Happy Raikoti, Kartar Cheema, Shivendra Mahal and Sardar Sohi as the lead cast of the film and was released worldwide on 2 September 2016.

== Cast ==
- Gurpreet Ghuggi – Darra Singh
- Happy Raikoti – Happy
- Kartar Cheema – Kartar Singh
- Shivendra Mahal – Sarpanch Joginder Singh
- Sardar Sohi – Subedar Surjit Singh
- Karamjit Anmol – Common village person
- Rana Ranbir – Village shopkeeper
- Pammi Bai – Paramjit Singh a.k.a. Pammi
- Nirmal Rishi – Mother of Darra, Pammi, and Kartar
- Manpreet Saggu
- Manveer Rai
- Raj Dhaliwal

== Soundtrack ==
Music by Kuljit Singh.

S. No.	Track	Singer	Lyrics	Music
1.	"Baahan De Vich Chooda"	Happy Raikoti	Happy Raikoti	Kuljit Singh
2.	"Mitti"	Akram Rahi	Akram Rahi	Kuljit Singh
3.	"Tappey"	Lehmbar Husain Puri & Harinder Hundal	Lok Geet	Kuljit Singh
4.	"Gidha"	Professor Satwant Kaur, Kudrat Kaur, Divya Saini, Mandeep Kaur, Mast Ali, Bhupinder Udat, Satnam Singh, Pammi Bai	Lok Geet	Kuljit Singh
5.	"Holi Holi Nach"	Pammi Bai & Upinder	Sahib Sabi	Kuljit Singh
6.	"Nachdi Vekh Ke"	Pammi Bai, Nachhatar Gill	Akram Rahi	Kuljit Singh

== Reception ==
Jasmine Singh of The Tribune opined that "Darra, this week’s Punjabi film release creates history, by being an exclusive movie to run without any storyline – from beginning to the end; well, not even a pinch of it".
