= Jagmohan Kaur =

Jagmohan Kaur Kang
- Also known as: Mai Mohno
- Born: 16 April 1948; Pathankot, Punjab, India
- Died: 6 December 1997 (aged 49) Ludhiana, Punjab, India
- Genres: Folk, Duets, Comedy
- Occupations: Singer, actress, teacher, comedian

Jagmohan Kaur Kang (16 April 1948 – 6 December 1997) was an Indian singer of Punjabi-language folk songs. She is known for her songs like Bapu Ve Add Hunni Ain, Ghara Wajjda, Gharoli Wajjdi.

== Career ==
She also sang duets with her husband, singer K. Deep, and the duo is well known for their comedy characters Mai Mohno and Posti. Poodna is another notable song by the duo. She acted in few Punjabi films such as Daaj (1976), Mutiyar (1979) and Dushmani Di Agg (1990). She also sang as playback singer for many others, including Sukhi Parwar (1980) and Do Jattiyan.

== Life ==
Kaur was born on 16 April 1948 to father Gurbachan Singh and mother Parkash Kaur in Pathankot, Punjab. She was raised in her native village Boor Majra (now in Ropar district) and she received her primary education from the village school. Then she joined Khalsa High School, Kurali and then Arya Training School, Kharar and did J.B.T. (Junior Basic Training) and also worked as a teacher at Mani Majra near Chandigarh.

Later, learning music from Kanwar S. Mohinder Singh Bedi, she left her job and started singing.

In a program in Calcutta, she met singer K. Deep. They formed their own group and later got married on 2 February 1971; which was love marriage. The couple had a daughter, "Billy" Gurpreet Kaur Mada.
