= Channo Kamli Yaar Di =

2016 Indian film

- Theatrical release poster
- Directed by: Pankaj Batra
- Written by: Naresh Kathooria
- Produced by: Neeru Bajwa Entertainment
- Starring: Neeru Bajwa; Binnu Dhillon; Karamjit Anmol; Rana Ranbir
- Cinematography: Vineet Malhotra
- Edited by: Manish More
- Music by: Jatinder Shah
- Production companies: Neeru Bajwa Entertainment; Mystery Man Productions
- Release date: 19 February 2016
- Countries: India, Canada
- Language: Punjabi

Channo Kamli Yaar Di (2016) is a Punjabi film directed by Pankaj Batra and starring Neeru Bajwa and Binnu Dhillon with a release date of 19 February 2016. Channo (Neeru Bajwa) is an emotional journey of a pregnant Punjabi girl who goes to Canada to find her missing husband, Jeet. Taji (Binnu Dhillon) goes along with her.

== Plot ==
Channo (Neeru Bajwa) is an emotional journey of a pregnant Punjabi girl who goes to Canada to find her missing husband, Jeet. Taji (Binnu Dhillon) goes along with her. However, Taji is in love with Channo since they met but was not able to express his feelings. They go through some obstacles in Canada. However, towards the end of the film, Taji finally expresses his feelings toward Channo. Channo tells him that she loves him as a "friend". At the end, they do successfully find Jeet after going through a lot of difficulties. Even though Taji helps Channo, he does not marry her as she is still in love with Jeet. They, However still remain good friends.

== Cast ==
- Neeru Bajwa as Chanpreet Kaur – Channo
- Binnu Dhillon as Taaji
- Karamjit Anmol as Jailly
- Rana Ranbir as Taaji's friend
- Anita Devgan as Taaji's mother
- Baninderjit Singh
- Jassi Gill as Jeet Sandhu (Special Appearance)

== Track listing ==
No.	Title	Lyrics	Music	Singer(s)	Length
1.	"Tere Begair"	Kumaar	Jatinder Shah	Amrinder Gill	3:30
2.	"Aaja Ni Aaja"	Gurdas Maan	Jatinder Shah	Gurdas Maan	2:24
3.	"Wakho Wakh"	Binder	Jatinder Shah	Prabh Gill	2:39
4.	"Yaar Di Gali"	Kumaar	Jatinder Shah	Nooran Sisters	3:39
5.	"Marjawaan"	Kumar	Jatinder Shah	Jassi Gill	3:47
Total length:					00:15:19

== Reception ==
Jasmine Singh from The Tribune claimed that it was a good story with generous seasoning of mystery, with crisp direction and fabulous acting by Binnu and Neeru Bajwa it now bags three and a half stars! Another site punjabvision.com praised CHANNO, declaring it "milestone in punjabi cinema".
