= Jassie Gill =

Indian singer and actor (born 1988)

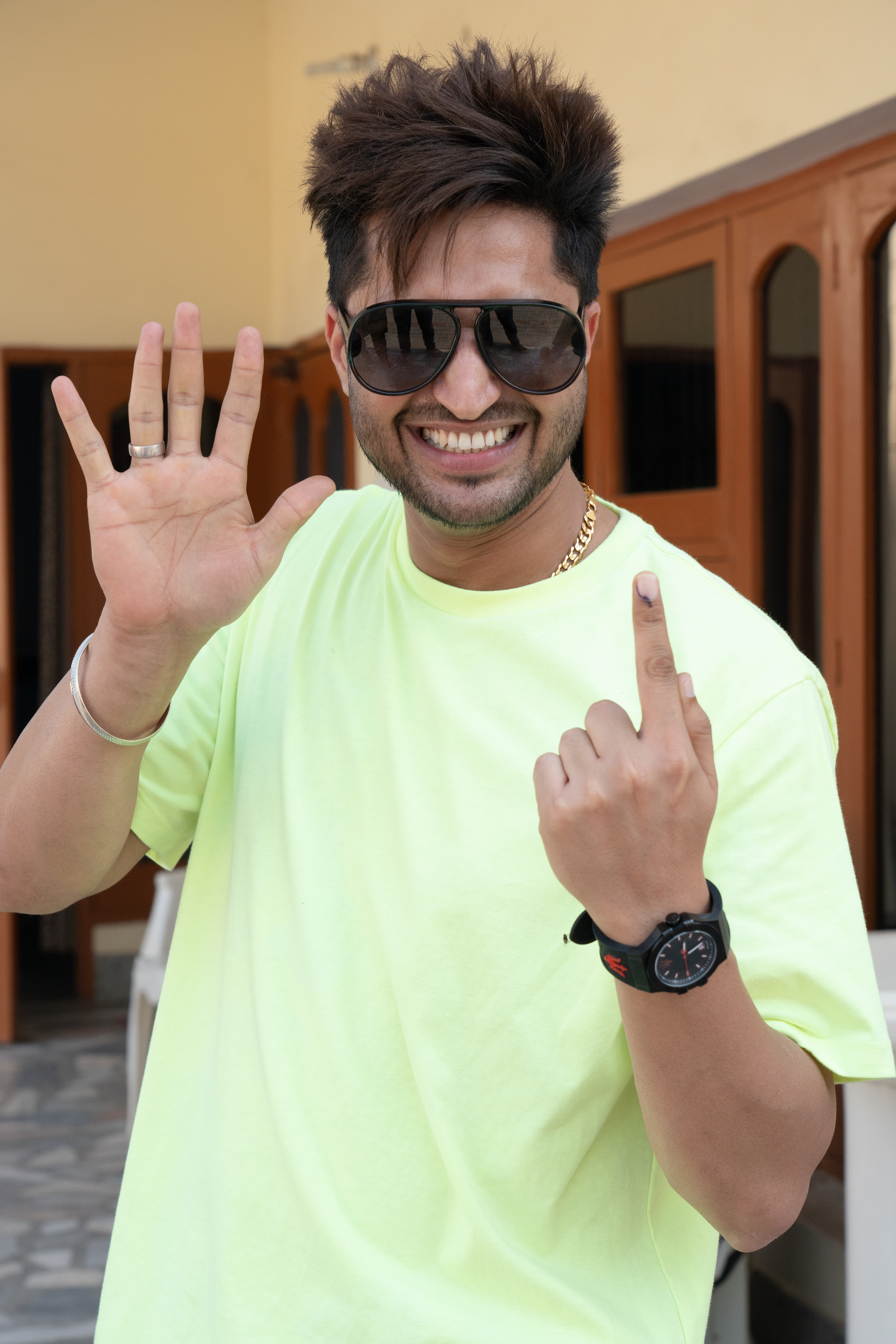
- Gill in 2019
- Born: Jasdeep Singh Gill; 26 November 1988 (age 37); Jandali, Ludhiana, Punjab, India
- Occupations: Singer; actor
- Years active: 2011-present
- Spouse: Rupinder Kaur‌ (m. 2015)
- Children: 2
- Musical career
- Genres: Bhangra; pop; romance
- Instrument: Vocals
- Labels: T-Series, Speed Records, Sony Music

Jasdeep Singh "Jassi" Gill (born 26 November 1988), is an Indian singer, live performer and actor associated with Punjabi and Hindi language music and films. He debuted in Punjabi cinema with the 2014 film Mr & Mrs 420 and in Hindi cinema with the 2018 film Happy Phirr Bhag Jayegi.

== Personal life ==
Gill was born Jasdeep Singh Gill on 26 November 1988 in Jandali village near Khanna in Ludhiana district of Punjab. He studied at Gobindgarh Public College where he took up two practical subjects, music and physical education. He was trained to sing in local youth festivals, where he placed second, four times consecutively. He struggled for three years before his debut. Gill married Rupinder Kaur‌ and has a daughter, Roojas Kaur Gill and a son, Jazzwin Gill.

== Music career ==
Gill made his debut in 2011 with the album Batchmate which included the song "Churiyan". In 2012 he followed this up by releasing the single "Vigrey Sharabi". In January 2013 he released his second album "Batchmate 2", which included the song "Lancer" with lyrics by Narinder Batth. He followed this up with the song "Classmate" that featured in the movie Daddy Cool Munde Fool. In September 2013 he came out with another single, "Pyar Mera". After the release of his album Replay, he released the single "Nakhre" in 2017.

== Acting career ==
Gill made his acting debut on the big screen in Mr & Mrs 420. He followed this up with Dil Vil Pyar Vyar. He paired with Roshan Prince and Simran Kaur Mundi in the romantic comedy Mundeyan Ton Bachke Rahin.

Gill signed to make a film with Gauahar Khan in February 2015, titled Oh Yaara Ainvayi Ainvayi Lut Gaya, which marked her debut in Punjabi films. He also starred in Channo Kamli Yaar Di alongside Neeru Bajwa. He debuted in Hindi cinema with the 2018 film Happy Phirr Bhag Jayegi, alongside Sonakshi Sinha, Diana Penty and Jimmy Sheirgill. It was released on 24 August 2018. In 2020, he acted in Panga, starring alongside Kangana Ranaut. He was last seen in 2021 film Kya Meri Sonam Gupta Bewafa Hai? co-starring Surbhi Jyoti in her debut film. In 2023, he played the role of Moh in Salman Khan's Kisi Ka Bhai Kisi Ki Jaan opposite Palak Tiwari. and upcoming Hall Ki Ae.

== Media ==
Gill was ranked in The Times Most Desirable Men at No. 42 in 2018, at No. 44 in 2019, at No. 42 in 2020.

He was ranked in the Chandigarh Times Most Desirable Men at No. 1 in 2018, at No. 2 in 2019 and at No. 1 in 2020.

== Discography ==
Jassie Gill discography
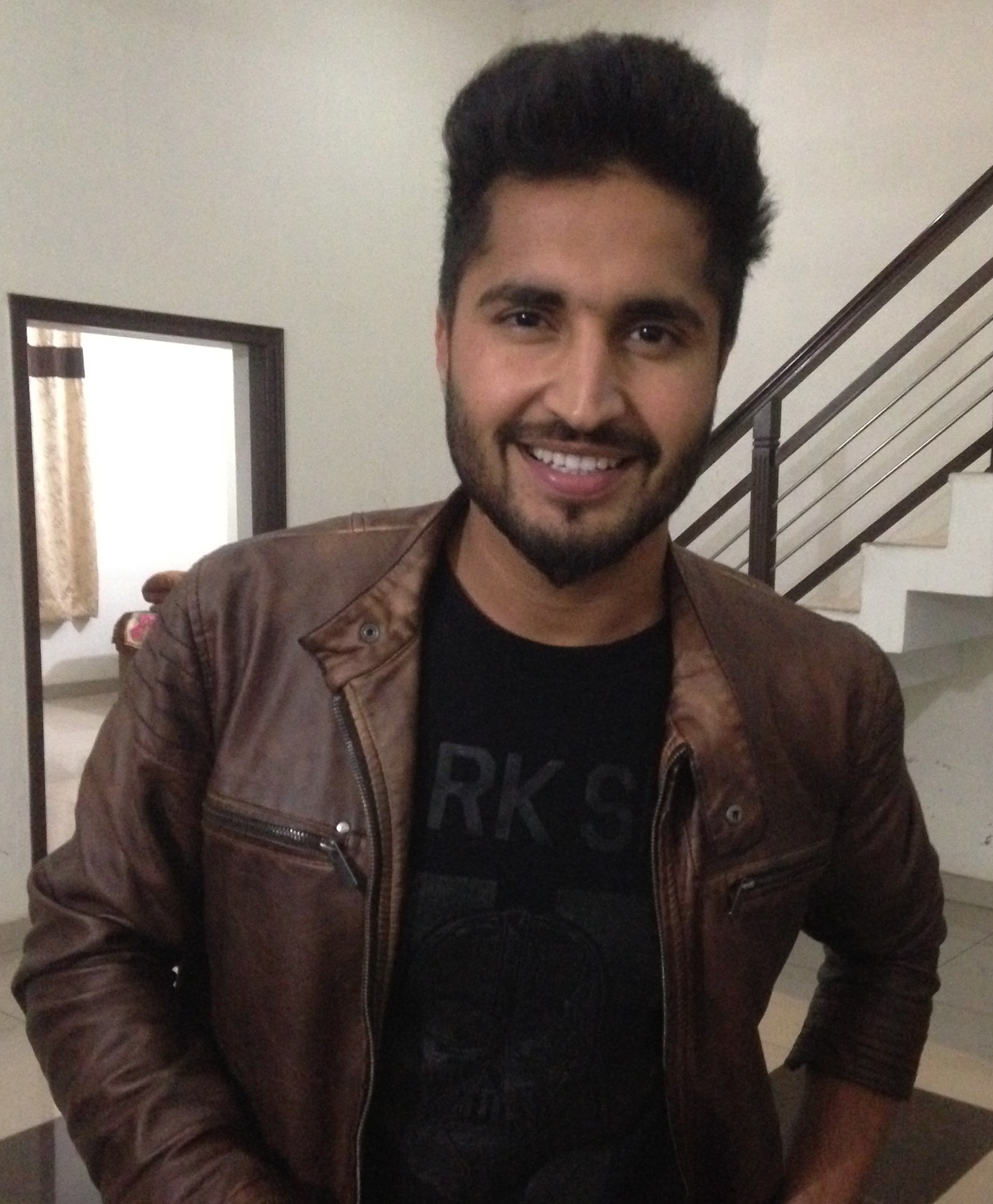
- Studio albums: 5
- Singles: 48
- Punjabi film soundtrack: 22
- Hindi film soundtrack: 3

=== Albums ===
Year	Album	Music director	Lyrics	Record label
2011	Batchmate	G Guri	Various	T-Series
2012	Batchamte 2	G Guri	Narinder Batth and many more	T-Series
2014	Replay -The Return of Melody	Desi Routz, Preet Hundal, Jatinder Shah, G Guri, Sukhe, Gupz Sehra	Happy Raikoti, Mintu Samra, Karan Aujla, Sohi Jagveer	Speed Records
2016	Jump 2 Bhangraaa (with Babbal Rai)	Desi Routz, Preet Hundal, Desi Crew, Mofolactic, DJ Flow	Narinder Batth, Kabal Saroopwali, Matt SheronWala, Jassi Lohka, Veet Baljeet, Babbu	Speed Records
2021	All Rounder	Preet Romaana(PRP) (8); Starboy Music X (2); Snappy (2); Sunny Vik (1); Ronn Sandhu (1)	Rav Hanjra (3); Mani Longia (2); Kaptaan (2); Ronny Ajnali, & Gill Machrai (2); Raj Fatehpur (2); Ash Sidhu & Arsh (1); Arron (2)	Jassie Gill

=== Singles ===
Year	Songs	Co-singer(s)/ Album	Music director	Lyrics	Record label
2011	"Churiyan"	Batchamte	G Guri	Livtar Singh Mankoo	T-Series
2011	"College"	Batchamte	G Guri	Ajay Nabha	T-Series
2012	"Vigre Sharabi"		G Guri	Laddi Bhatti	JRS Music
2013	"Teri Je Na Hoyi"	Batchamte 2	G Guri	Jassie Gill	T-Series
2013	"Lancer"	Batchamte 2	G Guri	Narinder Batth	T-Series
2013	"Pyar Mera"		Pav Dharia	Babbu	Speed Records
2013	"Mangeya Ae Dil"	Collaborations	Sheera Jasvir	Major Dhogri	T-Series
2014	"Ik Saal"	Shayar	B Praak	Jaani	Sony Music India
2014	"Laden"	Replay-The Return of Melody	Gupz Sehra	Happy Raikoti	Speed Records
2014	"Bapu Zimidar"	Replay-The Return of Melody	Jatinder Shah	Happy Raikoti	Speed Records
2014	"Vich Pardesan"	Replay-The Return of Melody	Desi Routz	Mintu Samra	Speed Records
2014	"3 Saal & Bull Gulabi Medley"	Replay-The Return of Melody	G Guri & Sukhe	Happy Raikoti	Speed Records
2015	"Youngster Return" with Babbal Rai	Babbal Rai	Jatinder Shah	Happy Raikoti	Speed Records
2016	"Attt Karti"		Desi Crew	Channa Jandali	Speed Records
2016	"Gabbroo"		Preet Hundal	Jaani	Speed Records
2016	"Yaar Jatt De"	Babbal Rai	Desi Routz	Narinder Batth	Speed Records
2016	"Gabbroo".		Preet Hundal	Jaani	Speed Records
2016	"Bournvita"	Jump 2 Bhangraaa	Desi Routz	Kabal Saroopwali	Speed Records
2016	"Snapchat"	Jump 2 Bhangraaa	Preet Hundal	Babbu	Speed Records
2016	"Nakhre"	Jump 2 Bhangraaa	Desi Routz	Maninder Kailey	Speed Records
2017	"Dill Tutda"		Goldboy	Nirmaan	Speed Records
2017	"Guitar Sikhda"		B Praak	Jaani	Speed Records
2018	"Dil Ton Black"	Badshah	B Praak	Jaani	T-Series
2018	"Jodi Teri Meri"		Desi Crew	Narinder Batth	Speed Records
2018	"Tru Talk"	Karan Aujla	Sukh-E	Karan Aujla	Speed Records
2018	"Nikle Currant"	Neha Kakkar	Sukh-E	Jaani	T-Series
2019	"Surma Kaala"		Snappy	Jass Manak	T-Series
2019	"Aukaat"	Karan Aujla	Desi Crew	Karan Aujla	Speed Records
2019	"Allah Ve"		Sunny Vik	Raj Fatehpuria	T-Series
2020	"Enna Chauni Aa"		Avvy Sra	Romaana	Jassie Gill
2020	"Keh Gayi Sorry"		Avvy Sra	Nirmaan	Jassie Gill
2020	"Baby You"		Deep Jandu	Babbu	Humble Music
2020	"Pyaar Mangdi"	Happy Raikoti	Avvy Sra	Happy Raikoti	Jassie Gill
2021	"Oye Hoye Hoye"	Simar Kaur	Avvy Sra	Happy Raikoti	T-Series
2021	"Pyaar Kari Jaane O"	Vikas	Sunny Vik	Raj Fatehpur	Jassie Gill
2021	"Surma"	Asees Kaur/All Rounder	Preet Romana (PRP)	Raj Fatehpur	Jassie Gill
2021	"Jindey Meriye"	Mickey Singh/All-rounder	Sunny Vik	Raj Fatehpur	Jassie Gill
2022	"Lambo"	All Rounder	Preet Romana (PRP)	Arron	Jassie Gill
2022	"Gaddi Kaali"	All Rounder	Preet Romaana (PRP)	Kaptaan	Jassie Gill

=== Songs in films ===
Film	Songs	Co-singer(s)	Music director	Lyrics	Record label
Daddy Cool Munde Fool	Classmate	Kaur B	Desi Crew	Bunty Bains	JRS Music
Dil Vil Pyaar Vyaar	"Mitran Da Dil Nachda"	Gurdas Maan	Jatinder Shah	Gurdas Maan	Saga Hits
Dil Vil Pyaar Vyaar	"Tamanna Meri"		Jatinder Shah	Vinder Nathu Majra	Saga Hits
Mr & Mrs 420	"Naina Nu"		Ksshitij Chaudhary	Kumaar	Lokdhun Punjabi
Mr & Mrs 420	"Glassi"	Yuvraj Hans	Ksshitij Chaudhary	Kumaar	Lokdhun Punjabi
Mundeyan To Bachke Rahin	"Mundeyan Ton Bachke Rahin"	Roshan Prince	Navinder Kirpal Singh	Kumaar	Sony Music
Mundeyan To Bachke Rahin	"Dil Da Plot"	Roshan Prince, Shipra Goyal	Navinder Kirpal Singh	Kumaar	Sony Music
Mundeyan To Bachke Rahin	"Suraj"	Roshan Prince	Navinder Kirpal Singh	Kumaar	Sony Music
Oh Yaaran Ainvayi Ainvayi Lut Gaya	"Amb Laine"	Roshan Prince, Shipra Goyal, Jassi Katyal	Navinder Kirpal Singh	Kumaar	Sony Music
Oh Yaaran Ainvayi Ainvayi Lut Gaya	"Khet"	Neha Kakkar	Jatinder Shah	Happy Raikoti	Speed Records
Oh Yaaran Ainvayi Ainvayi Lut Gaya	"Kede Pind Di"		Jatinder Shah	Happy Raikoti	Speed Records
Dildariyaan	"Book Book"	Sunidhi Chauhan	Jatinder Shah	Pali Giderbaha	Speed Records
Dildariyaan	"Ghagre Di Lauwn"	Kaur B	Jatinder Shah	Rachhpal Malhi	Speed Records
Dildariyaan	"Gaati Gutti"		Jatinder Shah	Happy Raikoti	Speed Records
Dildariyaan	"Aazma"		Jatinder Shah	Happy Raikoti	Speed Records
Channo Kamli Yaar Di	"Marjaawan"		Jatinder Shah	Kumaar	Speed Records
Sargi	"Fer Ohi Hoyea"		B Praak	Jaani	Lokdhun Punjabi
Sargi	"Jhumke"	Babbal Rai, Nimrat Khaira	Jay K	Veet Baljit	Lokdhun Punjabi
Happy Phirr Bhag Jayegi	Chin Chin Chu (Remake)	Sonakshi Sinha	Sohail Sen	Qamar Jalalabadi	Saregama
Mr & Mrs 420 Returns	"Tu Te Main"		Ksshitij Chaudhary	Happy Raikoti	Lokdhun Punjabi
High End Yaariyaan	"Churai Janda Eh"		Goldboy	Nirmaan	Junglee Music
Jai Mummy Di	Lamborghini (Remake)	Neha Kakkar	Meet Bros	Kumaar	T-Series
Panga	"Dil Ne Kaha" (Reprise)	Asees Kaur	Shankar–Ehsaan–Loy	Javed Akhtar	Saregama
Kya Meri Sonam Gupta Bewafa Hai?	Leke Pehla Pehla Pyaar	Simar Kaur	Avvy Sra	Happy Raikoti	Saregama

== Filmography ==
Key
†	Denotes films that have not yet been released

Year	Film	Role	Language	Notes
2014	Mr & Mrs 420	Jass	Punjabi	
2014	Dil Vil Pyaar Vyaar	Deepa	Punjabi	
2014	Mundeyan Ton Bachke Rahin	Jassi	Punjabi	
2015	Oh Yaara Ainvayi Ainvayi Lut Gaya	Ranbir	Punjabi	
2015	Dildariyaan	Parvan	Punjabi	
2016	Channo Kamli Yaar Di	Jeet Sandhu	Punjabi	Special appearance
2017	Sargi	Babbu	Punjabi	
2018	Mr & Mrs 420 Returns	Jass	Punjabi	
2018	Happy Phirr Bhag Jayegi	Khushwant Singh Gill	Hindi	Debut
2019	High End Yaariyan	Karan	Punjabi	
2020	Panga	Prashant Sachdeva	Hindi	
2021	Kya Meri Sonam Gupta Bewafa Hai?	Sintoo Bhaiya	Hindi	Zee5 film
2021	Fuffad Ji	Shinda	Punjabi	Cameo appearance
2023	Kisi Ka Bhai Kisi Ki Jaan	Moh	Hindi	
2024	Wild Wild Punjab	Gaurav Jain	Hindi	Netflix film
2025	Enna Nu Rehna Sehna Ni Aaunda	Jaggi	Punjabi	
2025	Mr & Mrs 420 Again	Jass	Punjabi	
TBA	Dare and Lovely †	Joker	Hindi/Urdu	
