= Balbir Singh Seechewal =

Indian environmentalist (born 1962)

Sant Balbir Singh Seechewal
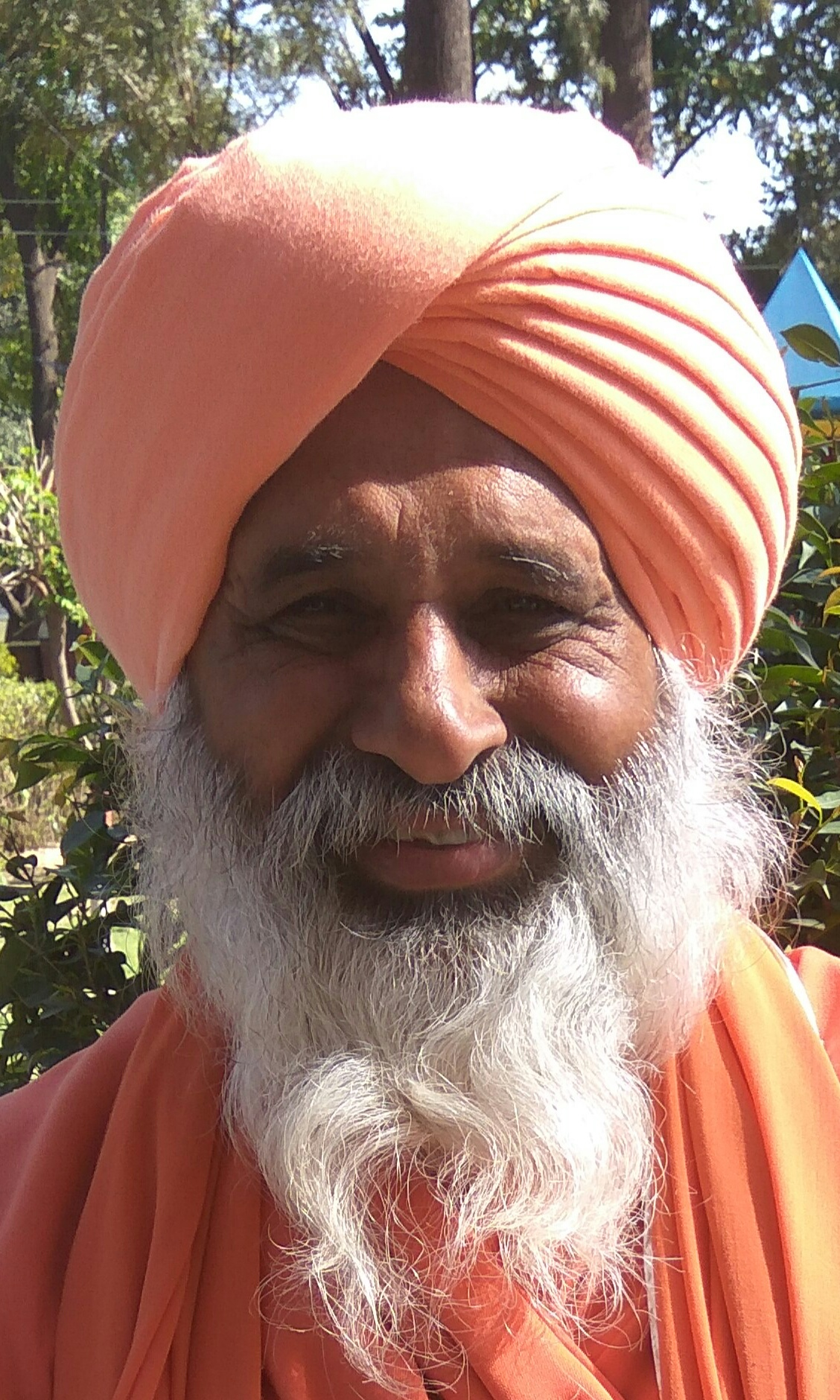

Member of Parliament, Rajya Sabha
- Incumbent
- Assumed office 4 July 2022
- Preceded by: Balwinder Singh Bhunder
- Constituency: Punjab

Personal details
- Born: 2 February 1962 (age 64) Sichewali, Jalandhar district, Punjab, India
- Party: Aam Aadmi Party
- Known for: Environmental Conservationist; Religious Figure; Parliamentarian

Religious life
- Religion: Sikhism
- Sect: Nirmala Samprada

Religious career
- Post: Sant of Shri Nirmal Kutiya, Village Sichewali, Jalandhar District, Punjab
- Predecessor: Sant Avtar Singh

Sant Balbir Singh Seechewal is a sikh religious figure, environmentalist and parliamentarian in India. He is a Nirmala Sikh and has been recognised for his role in the cleanup and revival campaigns of the rivers such as Kali Bein and Buddha Dariya. He is a member of the Rajya Sabha for Punjab, representing the Aam Aadmi Party.

== Life ==
Sant Balbir Singh Seechewal was born into a Sikh family engaged in agriculture in Sichewali, a village in Jalandhar district of Punjab. He is the son of Chanan Singh and Chanan Kaur. Balbir Singh studied Economics, Political Science and Punjabi in DAV College, Nakodar, Punjab.

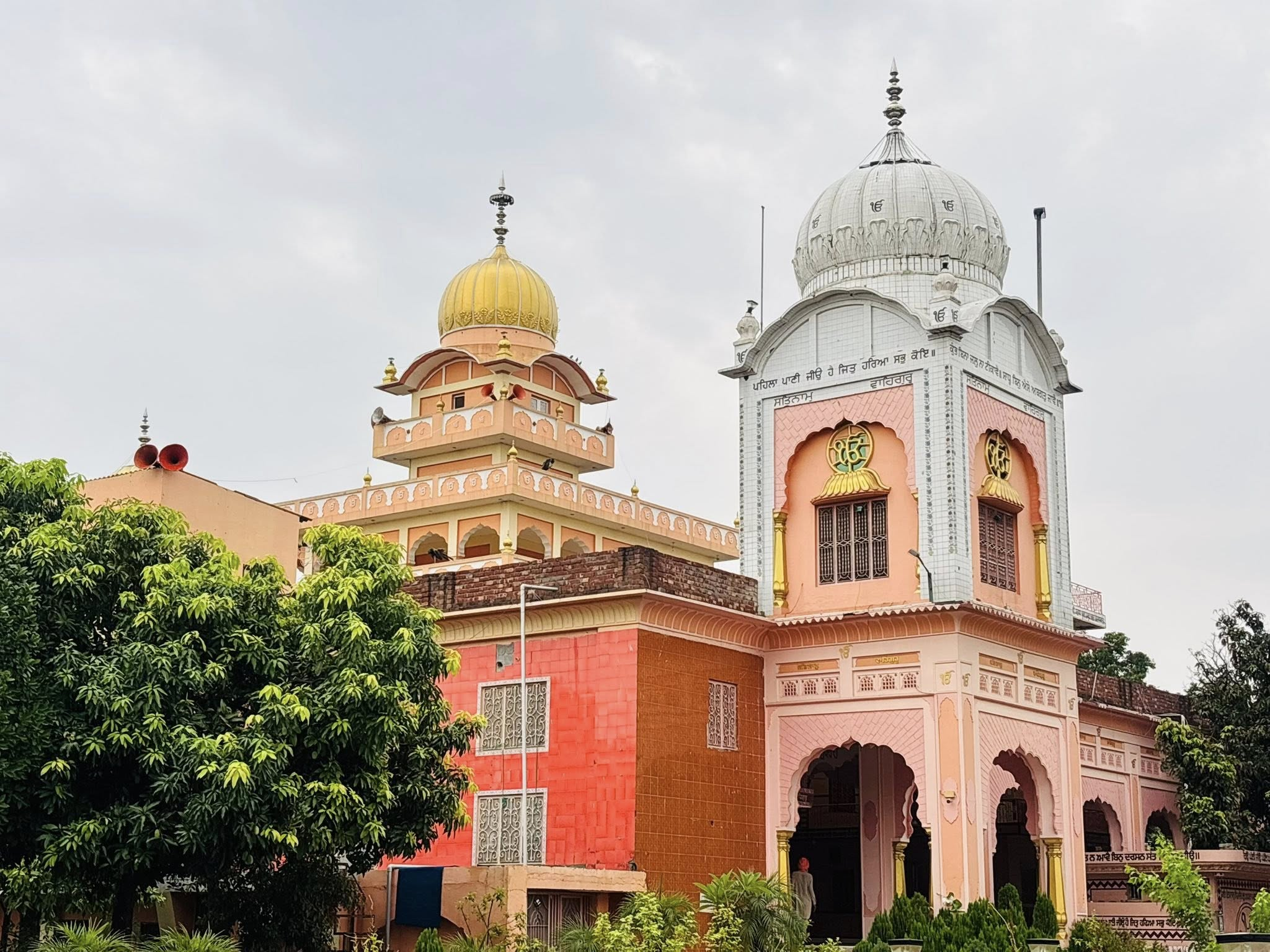
Shri Nirmal Kutiya, Village Sichewali.

Around 1981, he became associated with Shri Nirmal Kutiya in village Sichewali. He succeeded Sant Avtar Singh on June 6, 1988, thereby assuming his position and responsibilities as the head of Nirmal Kutiya. He had begun the social work in villages in the 1990s, carrying out cleanliness drives and advocating the revival of water sources.

== Environmental Conservation Campaigns ==
=== Kali Bein River ===
Sant Balbir Singh Seechewal worked for more than two decades on the restoration, cleaning, and maintenance of local rivulets, including the 160 km long Kali Bein, a tributary of the Beas River. The Kali Bein rivulet is historically important in Sikhism, as it is traditionally regarded as the site where Guru Nanak experienced a profound revelation.

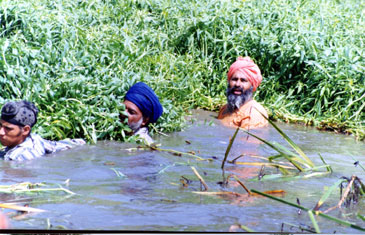
Seechewal during the Kali Bein cleanup campaign.

Several parts of the Kali Bein rivulet had gone extinct because of encroachment along its course. The rivulet was affected by pollution from agricultural runoff, untreated sewage discharge from nearby settlements, the spread of water hyacinth and the release of industrial waste. These factors disrupted the flow, reduced water quality, and led to brackish colour in different sections of the rivulet.

Seechewal led the campaign to clean the Kali Bein rivulet along with some members of Ek Onkar charitable trust. Leading up to the year 2000, there were some government attempts to clean up the river, but the campaign came to much larger public attention after Seechewal's cleanup campaign in 2000. The persistent efforts led to the drastic changes in the river management and made the water of Kali Bein even drinkable.

Balbir Singh Seechewal has also established plant nurseries at Sichewali village and Sultanpur Lodhi where one lakh plants are distributed annually free of cost among the people.

=== Buddha Nullah River ===
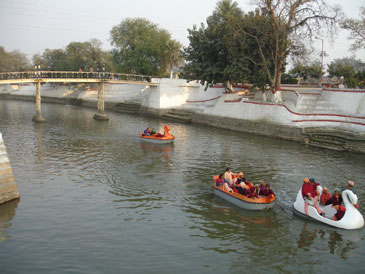
Water Boating in Kali Bein Rivulet after Cleanup Campaign

In 2024, Sant Balbir Singh Seechewal started a campaign to clean the Buddha Nullah rivulet on the lines of the Kali Bein Rivulet. Buddha Nullah is a Sutlej tributary, which passes through Ludhiana and joins the river before entering Rajasthan.

The history of the Buddha Nallah Rivulet is associated with Guru Nanak and Gurdwara Gaughat Sahib is located on its banks. Balbir Singh Seechewal started a campaign to clean and preserve the Buddha Nullah on the lines of the Kali Bein Rivulet.

The campaign included removing silt and solid waste using machinery and volunteer efforts, while also working to stop the direct flow of untreated sewage and dairy waste into the stream. Sant Balbir Singh held meetings with local stakeholders, like dairy owners, to manage waste and reduce pollution sources. As a result of these efforts, the water quality of Buddha Nullah has been improving significantly, with cleaner water reaching parts of Ludhiana and visible reduction in pollution levels in the rivulet.

=== Kanjili Lake Wetland ===
The Kanjili wetland was threatened by uncontrolled growth of water hyacinths, siltation, and eutrophication. In 2018, Sant Balbir Singh along with community volunteers and Punjab Pollution Control Board (PPCB) removed these flow obstacles from the tributary to the wetland. They also negotiated with the farmers to maintain sufficiently high flows from an inflowing irrigation channel to keep the regrowth of the water hyacinths under control. The Kanjili is a 490 hectare artificial wetland. It is home to rare and migratory birds and it has become a Ramsar site in 2002.

== Seechewal Model ==
The Seechewal Model (named after Sant Balbir Singh Seechewal) consists of various activities, including cleaning the river Kali Bein from water hyacinths and accumulated sediments, constructing roads, providing education, constructing sewerage systems, and social activities.

The inception of the Seechewal model happened at village Sichewali on the banks of the Chitti Bein at Shahkot in Jalandhar in 1999. The model has been successfully running across nearly 250 villages across Punjab and was also declared to be adopted in 1,657 villages along the banks of the Ganga by the Centre. The village Sichewali was chosen as a model village by the Ministry of Water Resources, River Development, and Ganga Re-juvenation. The model stands out in its efficiency in tackling issues leading to river pollution.

== Awards and honors ==
- Sant Balbir Singh was conferred the Padma Shri on 30 March 2017 by the then President of India, Pranab Mukherjee, in formal recognition of his contributions to environmental conservation efforts in the state of Punjab.
- The Time Magazine included Sant Balbir Singh Seechewal among its distinguished list of “Heroes of the Environment,” acknowledging his contributions to environmental conservation.

== Gallery ==
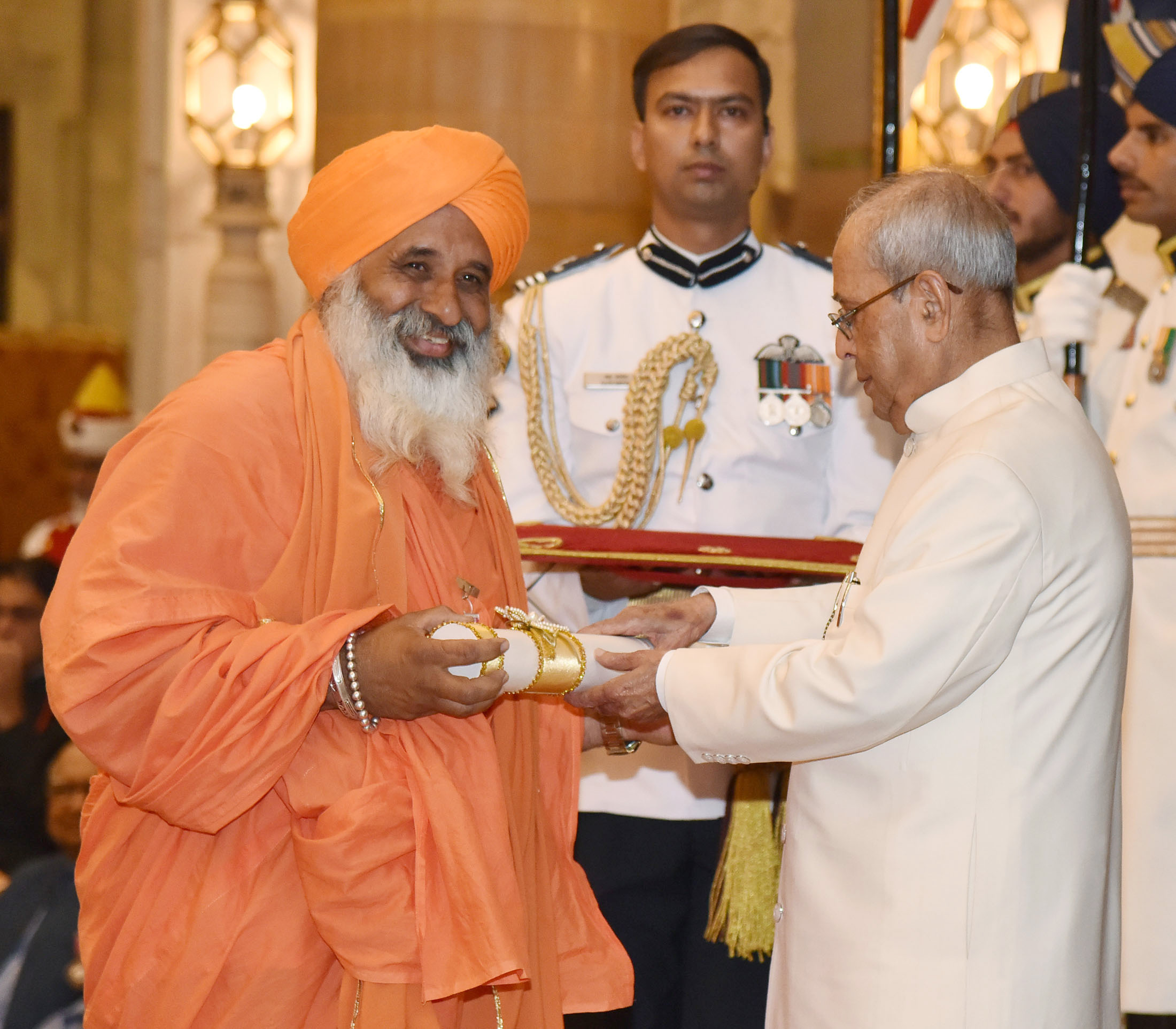
The President, Pranab Mukherjee presenting the Padma Shri Award to Sant Balbir Singh Seechewal

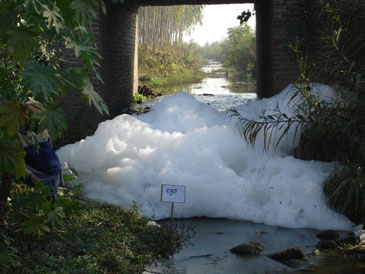
Pollution in Kali Bein before cleanup.

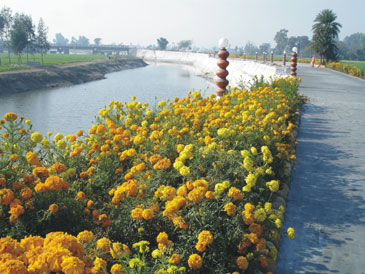
Beautification on the banks of Kali Bein Rivulet.

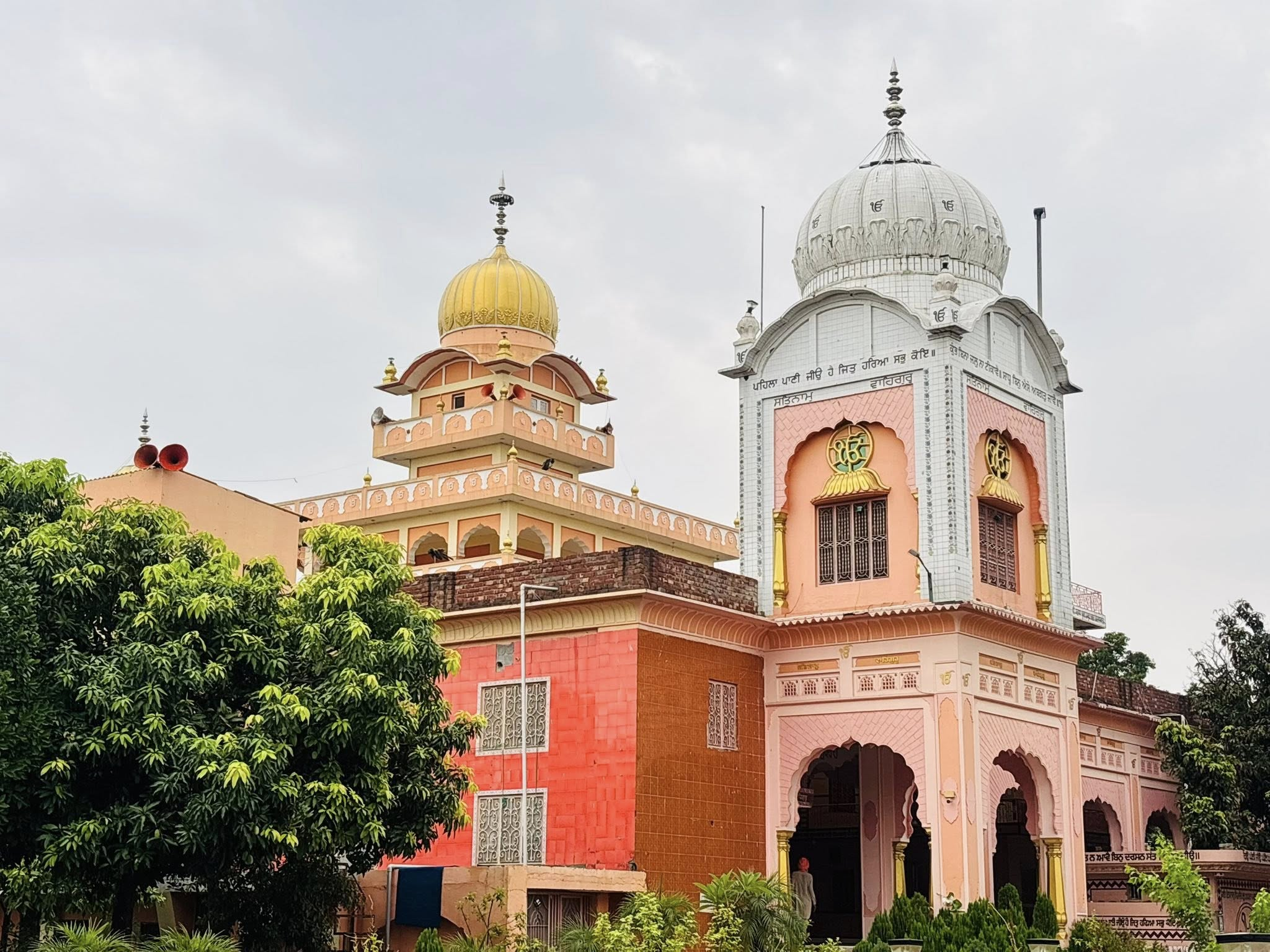
Shri Nirmal Kutiya, Village Sichewali, Jalandhar District.

Rajya Sabha
Preceded by List	Member of Parliament in Rajya Sabha for Punjab; 2022 –	Incumbent
