= Teshan (film) =

- Punjabi: ਟੇਸ਼ਨ
- Directed by: Sukhbir Singh
- Written by: Prince Kanwaljit Singh
- Screenplay by: Prince Kanwaljit Singh
- Produced by: Dhaniram Tokas & Ashok Janghu
- Starring: Happy Raikoti; Diljott; Yograj Singh; Shavinder Mahal; Anita Devgan; Karamjit Anmol
- Cinematography: Virender K Tiwari
- Edited by: Bunty Nagi
- Music by: Laddi Gill
- Production companies: Rahul Productions Pvt. Ltd; Paras Janghu Films
- Distributed by: White Hill Studio
- Release date: 23 September 2016
- Country: India
- Language: Punjabi

Teshan is a 2016 Indian Punjabi-language romantic comedy film directed by Sukhbir Singh, written by Prince KJ Singh and starring Happy Raikoti and Diljott in lead roles, with Yograj Singh, Shavinder Mahal, Karamjit Anmol, Anita Devgan' and Prince Kanwaljit Singh' in supporting roles. The Film is about the relations and simplicity of the village people, shown through different perspectives. The shooting commenced in March 2016 and release on 23 September 2016.

== Plot ==
Happy Raikoti plays a boy who comes from a backward village. Diljot plays an urban girl, who despite being modern understands relationship values. It is a youth based film.

== Cast ==
- Happy Raikoti as Teshan
- Diljott as Jinni
- Yograj Singh
- Shivendra Mahal
- Karamjit Anmol
- Nisha Bano
- Anita Devgan
- Prince KJ Singh
