= Navv Inder =

Indian singer

- Genres: Desi Hip Hop; Rhythm and blues
- Occupation: Singer
- Years active: 2013–present
- Labels: Times Music; T-Series

Navv Inder is an Indian R&B singer. In collaboration with rapper Badshah, In 2016, his song "Wakhra Swag" won, PTC Punjabi Music Awards for the best duo/group and most popular song of the year. "Wakhra Swag" had more than 260 million hits on YouTube in May 2020.

== Early life ==
He was born in Gurusar Sudhar, Ludhiana. He did his Master of Business Administration in finance from Chandigarh University.

== Career ==
He recreated his song "Wakhra Swag" as the "The Wakhra Song" for the film Judgementall Hai Kya. The song, sung by him along with Lisa Mishra and Raja Kumari, featured the lead characters Kangana Ranaut and Rajkummar Rao. The song marked his debut as a playback singer for Hindi films.

== Discography ==
=== Singles ===
| Year | Album | Record label | Notes |
|---|---|---|---|
| 2013 | Yarran nu | Lokdhun Punjabi | Lyrics: Harjeet Brar; Music: Desi Routz |
| 2015 | Wakhra Swag | Times Music | Lyrics: Navi Kamboz; Music: Badshah |
| 2016 | Att Tera Yaar ft. VJ Bani | Speed Records | Lyrics: Navv Inder; Music: Nakulogic |
| 2016 | Kach | Navv Music | Lyrics: Kaddon Navdeep; Music: Desi Routz |
| 2017 | Tu Meri Ki Lagdi | Times Music | Lyrics: Navi Kamboz |
| 2017 | Lalkaara | Navv Music | Lyrics: Gavy Dhindsa |
| 2017 | Yaar Bolda | T-Series | Lyrics:Navi |
| 2018 | DMND (Diamond) | Navv Inder Official | Lyrics: Navi Kamboz; Music: Mr. Nakulogic |
| 2018 | Dolce Gabbana | Navv Inder Official | Lyrics: Romey Maan Music: DJ Twinbeatz |
| 2018 | Get Loud | Times Music | Lyrics: Navv Inder Music: Delhi 2 Dublin |
| 2018 | Katal ft. Ikka | Zee Music Company | Lyrics: Mr. Richie Music: Manj Music |
| 2018 | Repeat Kaafila | Navv Inder Official | Lyrics: Manjit Music: Dhruv G |
| 2018 | Sign | Navv Inder Official | Lyrics: Kaddon Navdeep Music: Dhruv G |
| 2018 | Weapon | Navv Inder Official | Lyrics: Harjeet Brar Music & Rap: Haji Springer |
| 2018 | "Get Loud" | | Delhi 2 Dublin song; as a featured artist |
| 2019 | "Fark Ni Painda" | | |
| 2019 | "Strawberry Warga" | | |
| 2019 | "SURMA" | | |
| 2021 | "Dark Night" | Zee Music Company | Rap and Lyrics :Roach killa Music Dj Dips |

=== Extended plays ===
- Kaafila (2018)

=== Film soundtrack ===
| Year | Film | Song | Singer(s) | Composer(s) | Lyrics(s) | Note | Ref |
|---|---|---|---|---|---|---|---|
| 2019 | Judgementall Hai Kya | The Wakhra Song | Navv Inder, Lisa Mishra, Raja Kumari | Tanishk Bagchi | Tanishk Bagchi, Raja Kumari | Debut Film | |
