= Gurdwara Sri Ber Sahib =

Gurdwara in Punjab, India

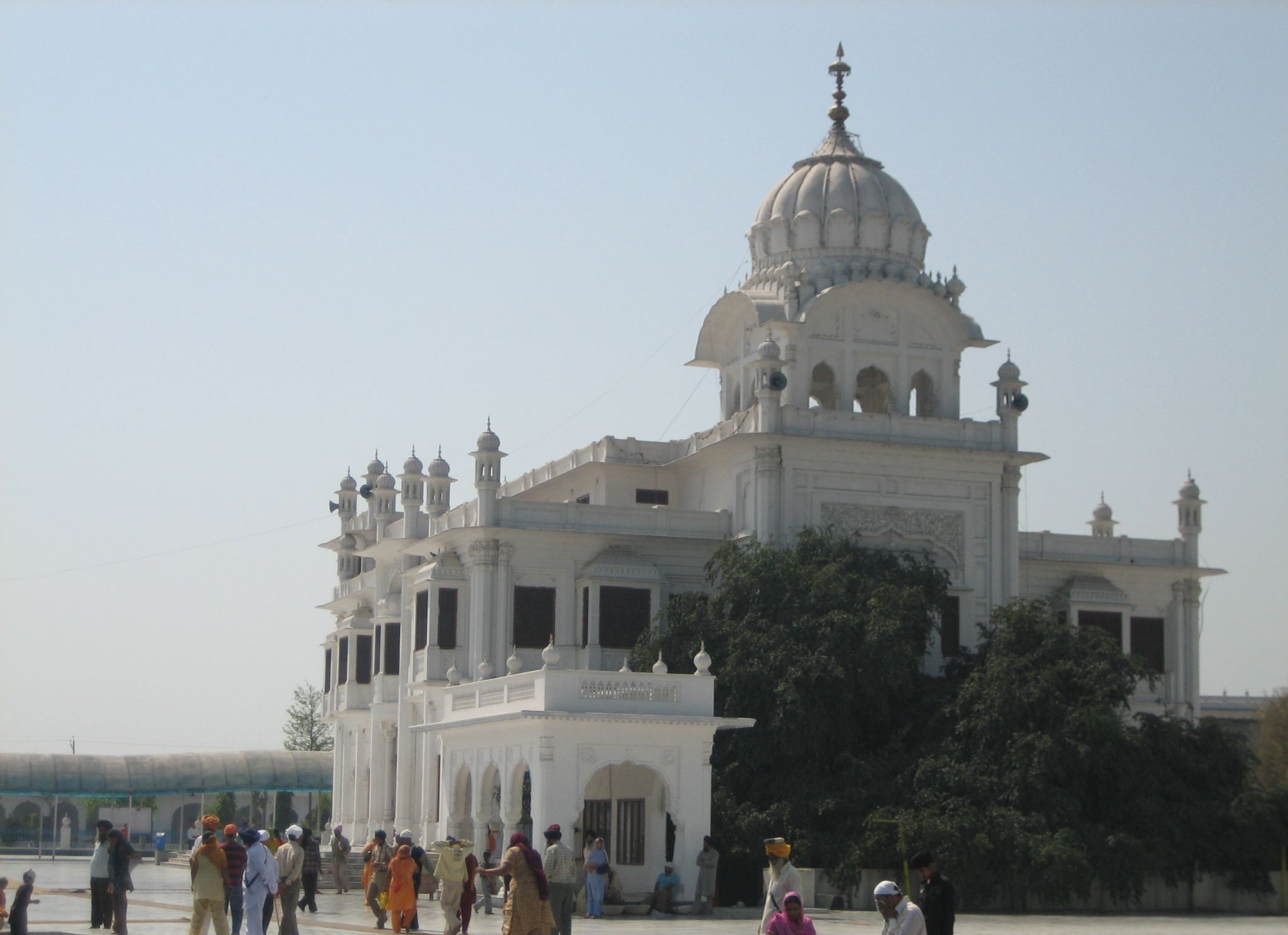
- Gurdwara Ber Sahib

Religion
- Affiliation: Sikhism
- District: Kapurthala
- Deity: Waheguru
- Festival: Guru Nanak Gurpurab

Location
- Location: Sultanpur Lodhi
- State: Punjab
- Country: India
- Interactive map of Gurdwara Sri Ber Sahib
- Coordinates: 31.2165°N 75.1850°E

Architecture
- Type: Gurdwara
- Style: Sikh architecture
- Founder: Maharaja Jagatjit Singh

Gurdwara Sri Ber Sahib is a gurdwara in the city of Sultanpur Lodhi, Kapurthala district, Punjab, India, situated on the banks of Kali Bein rivulet. It commemorates the place where Guru Nanak Dev, the first Sikh guru, had a mystical experience leading to his founding of the Sikh religion.

== History ==
According to the traditional janamsakhis (birth narratives) of Guru Nanak, in 1499 at the age of 30 he travelled to Kali Bein to bathe. When he failed to return home, people gathered at the site and saw him emerge from beneath the water three days later, saying "There is no Hindu, there is no Muslim." Guru Nanak planted a jujube tree (called ber in some Indian languages) at the site, after which the Gurdwara would later be named.

The gurdwara which now stands at the site was built by Maharaja Jagjit Singh of Kapurthala. Its cornerstone was laid in 1937 or 1938 and it was finally completed in 1941 or 42.

== See also ==
- Sultanpur Lodhi
- Gurdwara Baba Bakala Sahib
