= Surma Kaala =

Single by Jassie Gill

Single by Jassi Gill
- Language: Punjabi
- Length: 3:33
- Label: T-Series
- Composer: Jass Manak
- Lyricist: Jass Manak
- Producer: Bhushan Kumar

Music video
- "Surma Kaala" on YouTube

"Surma Kaala" is a Punjabi single by Jassie Gill featuring Rhea Chakraborty. Composed and lyrics are by Jass Manak, released on 11 April 2019 by T-Series.

== Music video ==
Video of the song was published by T-Series on 12 April 2019 on YouTube. The music video alongside Jassi Gill features Rhea Chakraborty - The Maagi and it has well received over 80 million views Jassi Gill.

== Reception ==
The song is well praised and received by audience.
