= Buddha Nullah =

Stream in India

Coordinates: 30.931°N 75.977°E

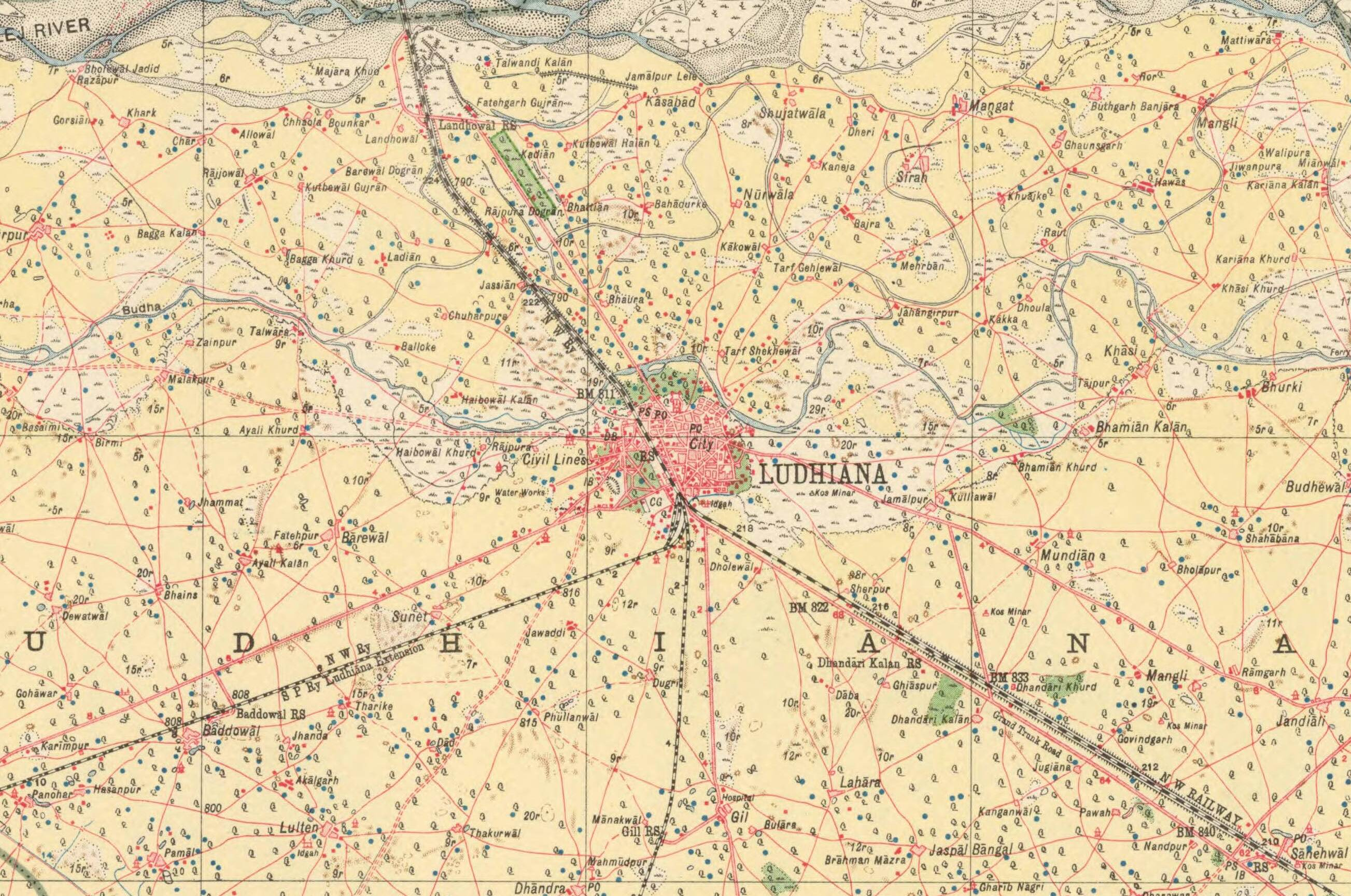
Flow of the Buddha Nullah through Ludhiana city, Survey of India geographical block-map for 44 N NE Jullundur (1921)

Buddha Nullah or Buddha Nala (Punjabi: ਬੁੱਢਾ ਨਾਲ਼ਾ) is a seasonal water stream or nullah, which runs through the Malwa region of Punjab, India, and after passing through highly populated Ludhiana district, Punjab, India, it drains into Sutlej River, a tributary of the Indus River. Today, it has also become a major source of pollution in the region as well the main Sutlej river, as it gets polluted after entering the highly populated and industrialized Ludhiana city, turning it into an open drain. Also, since large area in south-western Punjab solely depend on the canal water for irrigation, and water from Buddha Nullah enters various canals after Harike waterworks near Firozpur, thus affecting far-reaching areas such as Malout, Zira, upper Lambi, while the areas being fed by Sirhind feeder, are the most-affected by its pollution.

== Hydrology ==
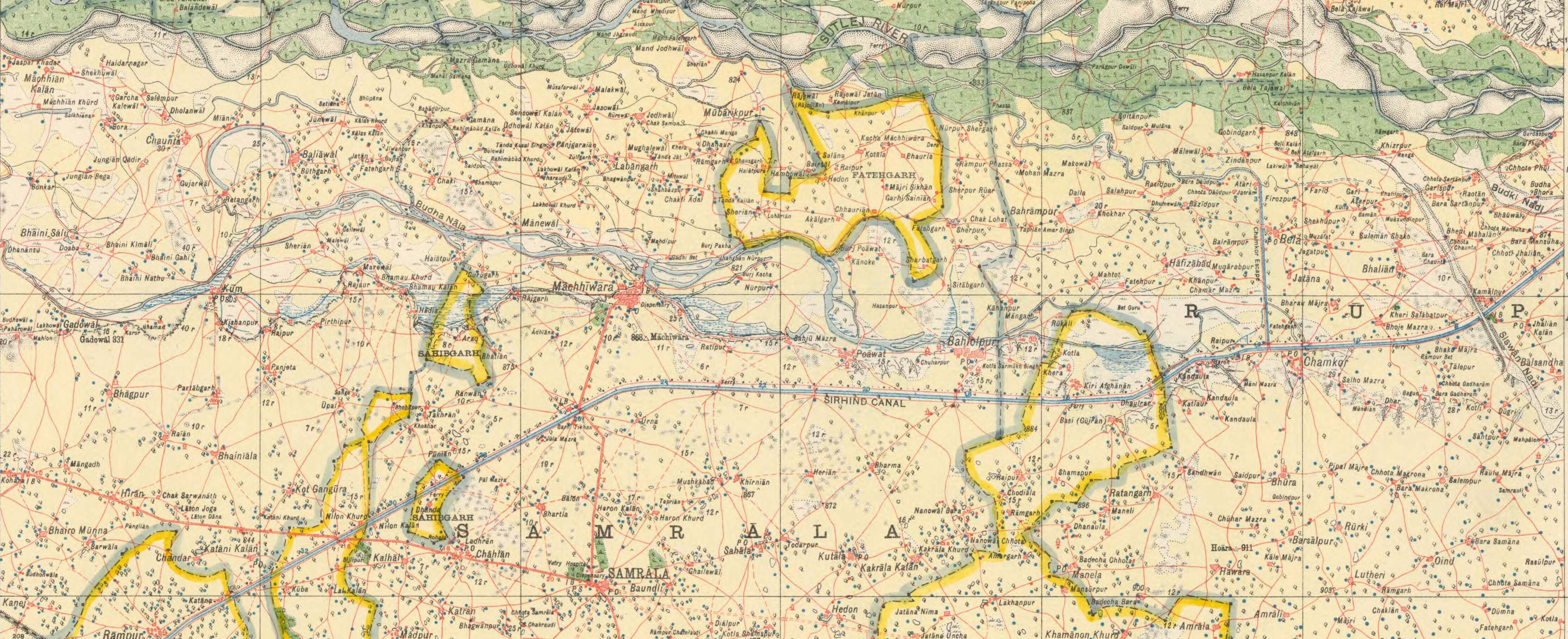
Flow of the Buddha Nullah past Chamkaur, Fatehgarh, and Machhiwara, Survey of India geographical block-map for 53 B NW Nabha (1917)

Buddha Nullah, literally meaning "old rivulet or "old watercourse", originates at village Koom Kalan of Ludhiana and it runs parallel to the Satluj on its south for a fairly large section of its course in the Ludhiana district and ultimately joins the Satluj at Walipur Kalan in the northwestern corner of the district. Cities of Ludhiana and Machhiwara are situated to the south of the Buddha Nala.

Under the high-bank of the old course of the Sutlej emerges the Buddha Nullah, where is a perennial stream that originates at Chamkaur and enters Ludhiana district near Bahlopur, passing nearby the city of Ludhiana, re-entering the Sutlej at Jagraon Tehsil, near the district boundary with the neighbouring Firozpur district.

== Pollution and clean-up ==
The Buddha Nullah is polluted, with its polluted waters entering the Sirhind Feeder meant for irrigation and subsequently polluting downstream branches, such as the Abohar Branch. In 2006, a Ludhiana-based human rights organization, filed a case regarding the state of this nullah in the Punjab State Human Rights Commission (PSHRC) and even invited environmentalist, Balbir Singh Seechewal, who had earlier cleaned the 164-km-long highly polluted Kali Bein rivulet with the help of his followers and without the government aid, to take the cause of cleaning up the nullah.

A study conducted by Punjab Agricultural University in 2008, revealed presence of toxins and heavy metals in the food chain due to use of its water, to cultivate vegetables and other crops. This was followed by another study by the School of Public Health, Department of Community Medicine, PGIMER, Chandigarh, and the Punjab Pollution Control Board (PPCB), which also showed heptachlor, beta-endosulphan and chlorpyrifos pesticides in concentrations exceeding the maximum residue limit in samples of ground and canal water used for drinking, the pesticides were also detected in fodder, vegetables, blood, bovine and human milk samples, indicating that these have entered the food chain due to the use of agricultural run-off and irrigation of field with drain water. With increasing poisoning of the soil, the region once hailed as the home to the Green Revolution, now due to excessive use of chemical fertilizer, is being termed the "Other Bhopal", and "even credit-takers of the Revolution have begun to admit they had been wrong, now that they see wastelands and lives lost to farmer suicides in this "granary of India".

=== Government efforts ===
Presently, sewage treatment plants of 466 MLD (48 MLD at Jamalpur, 111 & 50 MLD at Bhattian and 152 & 105MLD at Balloke) are operational for the treatment of the sewage of Ludhiana city.

In June 2009, Ludhiana district administration imposed article 144 around the nullah, banning the throwing of garbage in it, but in the following months it was scarcely implemented, despite public outcry. In the following month, the Government of Punjab, allocated Rs. 500 million for the cleaning up of the nullah., and in August, the municipal corporation in a demolition drive, removed a large number of illegal encroachments from both sides of the nullah.

In 2020 Punjab Government approved a Rs650 crore project for rejuvenation of polluted Nullah, Chief Minister asked local government to complete project under 2 years. In December 2022, the testing of newly built treatment plants began. In 2023, 95% of the work was done and in same year, 31 December was marked deadline after already missing five dates due to delay caused by COVID-19. The project was taken as the top most priority and the work was progressing fast to meet the deadline. However, the government clean-up project failed to produce results and a Buddha Dariya was not achieved. Over the past 40 years, numerous government administrations have made promises to clean the nullah but none have been successful. The toxic waters of the nullah continue to cause disease and premature-death in the localities surrounding it.

=== Private efforts ===
Balbir Singh Seechewal, who cleaned-up the Kali Bein, launched a kar seva effort to clean the Buddha Nullah in December 2024. Seechewal's clean-up efforts have been criticized as PR stunt by only sharing photographs of select, clean stretches of the nullah upstream, whilst ignoring the more polluted, downstream sections.

== Sikhism ==
The Buddha Nullah is connected to Guru Nanak, which is marked by Gurdwara Gaughat.

== See also ==
- Water pollution in India
