= Diljott =

Indian actress

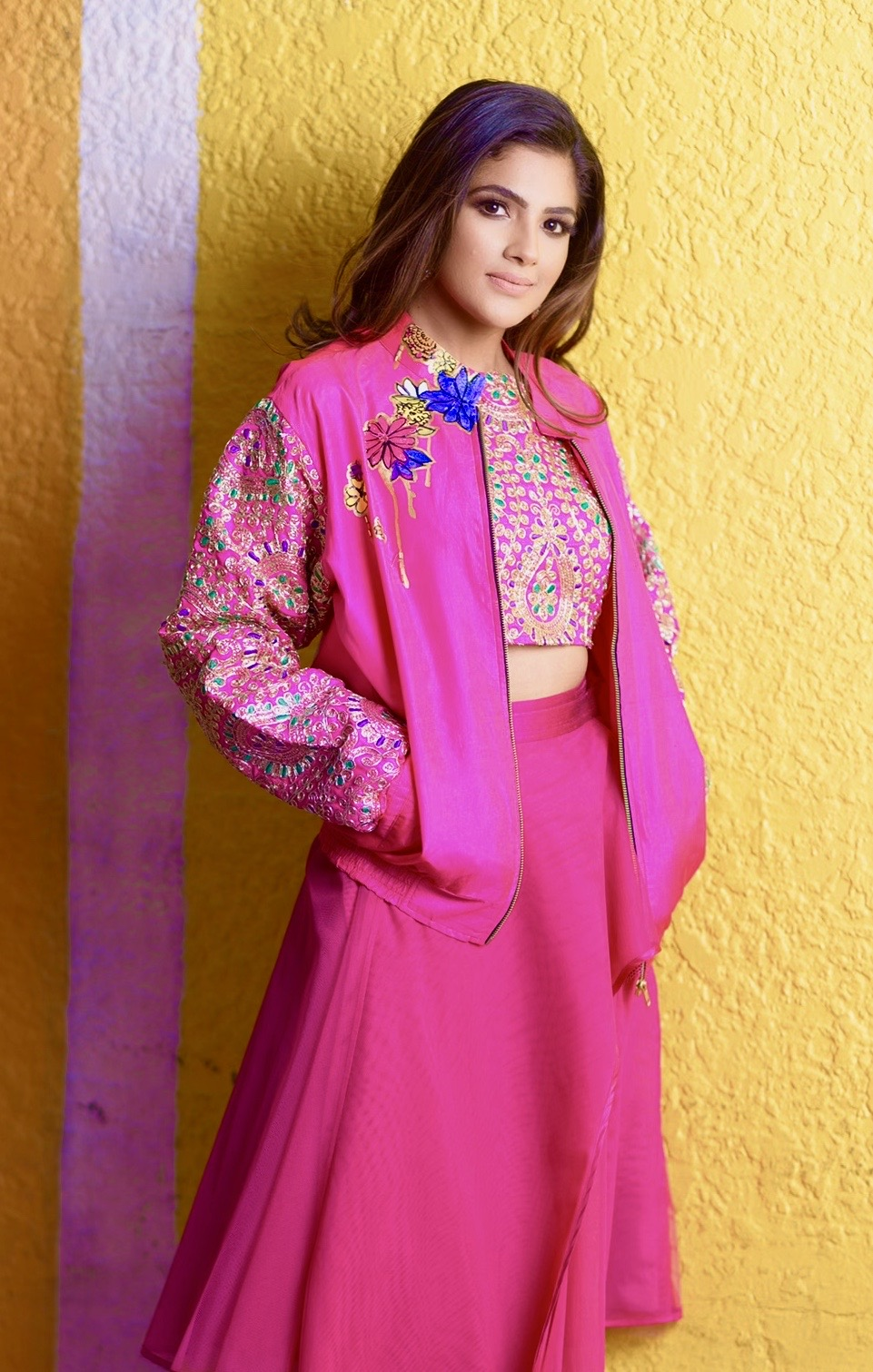
- Born: Diljott; December 1998 (age 27)
- Education: Harvard University; University of British Columbia; Panjab University; Amity University
- Occupations: Actress, Scholar, Humanitarian
- Years active: 2014–present

Diljott is an Indian actress. She is known for her roles in Hindi and Punjabi cinema, in films such as Teshan (2016), Yaar Annmulle 2 (2017), and Rang Ratta (2023). Diljott has also appeared in the 2018 English-language film 5 Weddings.

== Early life and education ==
Diljott is born in a family of academicians and has herself excelled in academics. She is fluent in English, Punjabi, and Hindi.

She studied public policy at Harvard University and International Development at the University of British Columbia. Diljott received a Bachelor of Arts in Psychology Honors and Masters in Human Rights from Panjab University in Chandigarh and is a University Gold Medalist twice for standing first in Graduation and Masters in the University She has also done a Post Graduate Course in NGO Management.

== Career ==
Diljott was trained at the Mumbai Acting Institute and is a dancer skilled in Kathak, Western, and folk styles. After working with photographer Dabboo Ratnani, she appeared in advertising campaigns and magazine covers for various brands and companies including Hindustan Petroleum Corporation Limited and Larsen & Toubro. Diljott recorded the song "Matwaliye" with Satinder Sartaaj, and performed in other collaborations including: "Diamond Koka" with Gurnam Bhullar, "Patiala Peg" with Diljit Dosanjh, "Munda Grewala Da" with Gippy Grewal,"Pehli Mulaqat" with Gurnam Bhullar, "Dard Ishq Hai', "Will Forget" with Parmish Verma, and "Wang Golden" with Sajjan Adeeb. Diljott starred as a lead actress in Teshan (2016) and Yaar Annmulle 2 (2017). She appeared in the Hollywood film 5 Weddings (2018). She starred as a lead actress in Khatre Da Ghuggu (2020) and the film Rang Ratta (2023).

Her single "Tere Rang" (2017), was used as a playback song for 5 Weddings. Another single was "Akh Mataka" (2017). Diljott performed at the 2016 Virasat International Punjabi Film Festival and Awards. Her song "Maa Meri" (2017) is an ode to mothers. "Just Love You" (2018) was a romantic song.

In 2024, she starred as the lead singer in the Hindi film Krispy Rishtey, which was released on Jio Cinemas. She also appeared in the 2024 Hindi ghazal project Jab Bhi Kisi Nigah Ne, featuring music by Sajid Wajid and vocals by Mohammad Hussain and Ahmed Hussain.

== Personal life ==
She is active in sports In April 2023, Diljott was a TEDX speaker at IITA Allahabad, India.

She is the founder of NGO Dream Buds Foundation, which is a trust to support the underprivileged who are impacted by a lack of resources, environment, support, guidance, or impoverished conditions or circumstances Diljott is an Organ Donor and has pledged to organ donation. She was awarded India Inspirational Women Award in 2021 by Dr. Kiran Bedi and also honored by Punjab Government for her work during the COVID-19 pandemic and Punjab Floods 2025.

== Filmography ==
| Year | Film | Language | Role | Notes |
|---|---|---|---|---|
| 2016 | Teshan | Punjabi | Jinni | Film released on 23 September 2016. Directed by Sukhbir Singh, the film stars Happy Raikoti, Diljott, Yograj Singh, Karamjit Anmol, Shavinder Mahal, Anita Devgan, Prince Kanwaljit Singh, Nisha Bano and many more. |
| 2017 | Yaar Annmulle 2 | Punjabi | Sabar | Film released on 6 January 2017. Directed by Sunny Mahal, the film stars Sarbjit Cheema, Sarthi K, Raja Baath, Diljott, Yograj Singh, Param Saini, Rana Jung Bahadur and many more. |
| 2018 | 5 Weddings | English | Harleen | Hollywood film released in 2018 worldwide. The film stars Raj Kummar Rao, Nargis Fakhri, Diljott, Candy Clark, Bo Derek, Anneliese Der Pol, Mariana and many more. |
| 2020 | Khatre Da Ghuggu | Punjabi | Meet | A Punjabi film released worldwide on 17 January 2020. The film stars Jordan Sandhu, Diljott, BN Sharma and others. |
| 2023 | Rang Ratta | Punjabi | Simran | A Punjabi film releasing worldwide on 24 March 2023. The film stars Roshan Prince, Diljott, Gurpreet Ghuggi and others. |
| 2024 | Plaster | Punjabi | Majnu | Played a power packed role of Majnu in the web series Plaster which released on Chaupal App and Amazon. Written by Prince Kanwaljit Singh |
| 2024 | Krispy Rishtey | Hindi | Anjali | Played the character of Anjali, who is an innocent, simple girl hailing from Jaipur and her journey pre and post marriage in the film. Film stars Jagat Singh, Ronit Kapil, Brijendra Kalan, Murali Sharma, Shruti Ulfat and beautiful songs by Shreya Ghoshal, Mohit Chauhan, Pappon, Richa Sharma, Jubin Nautiyal. |

== Videos ==
| Year | Song | Notes |
|---|---|---|
| 2024 | Jab Bhi Kisi Nigah Ne | Music by Sajid Wajid, sung by Padma Shri singers Ahmed Hussain and Mohammad Hussain. |
| 2024 | Makhmali Raahan | Starred opposite Satinder Sartaaj in this romantic song. |
| 2022 | Wang Golden | Starred opposite Sajjan Adeeb in this romantic track. |
| 2022 | Will Forget | Starred opposite Parmish Verma in a Hindi track. |
| 2022 | Dard Ishq Hai | Starred in a popular Bollywood track. |
| 2022 | Pehli Mulaqat | Starred opposite Gurnam Bhullar in a romantic track. |
| 2022 | Munda Grewala Da | Starred opposite superstar Gippy Grewal. |
| 2022 | Diamond Koka | Starred opposite Gurnam Bhullar. |
| 2020 | Matwaliye | Starred opposite Satinder Sartaaj. |
| 2014 | Patiala Peg | Starred opposite Punjabi superstar Diljit Dosanjh. |

== Songs ==
| Year | Single Track | Release date | Notes |
|---|---|---|---|
| 2017 | Tere Rang | 9 February 2017 | This song was released by Lokdhun.It was also selected as a playback song for a Hollywood film '5 Weddings'. |
| 2017 | Akh Mataka | 10 July 2017 | This song was released by Lokdhun. It is a Punjabi beat song. |
| 2017 | Maa Meri | 25 November 2017 | This song is dedicated to motherhood. |
| 2018 | Just Love You | 9 August 2018 | An Urban Romantic song to celebrate love. |

== Awards and recognition ==
| Year | Award/Honors | Ceremony |
|---|---|---|
| 2023 | Honored as Shaan Punjab Di by Hon'ble Governor Punjab and Administrator, UT, Chandigarh | Achievers Awards 2023 |
| 2021 | Honored as an Actor and a Philanthropist | India Inspirational Women Awards 2021 |
| 2017 | Honored for great work in Film/Music industry | Punjab Arts Council in association with Ministry of Culture, India |
| 2016 | Excellence in Cultural and Academic field | District Administration, Mohali, India |
| 2014 | New Promising face of Punjabi Cinema | Golden Honors Awards Ceremony, Jalandhar, India |
| 2014 | Recognition of talent and creativity. | International Sikh Arts and Film Festival, California, USA |
