= Desi Routz =

Punjabi music composer duo

- Origin: Punjab, India
- Occupation: Music Composer
- Members: Hardeep Singh Khangura; Jaspreet Singh

Desi Routz is a Punjabi music composer duo consisting of Hardeep Singh Khangura and Jaspreet Singh. The duo Known predominantly for their compositions in Punjabi music.

They have worked with artists such as Ranjit Bawa, Babbal Rai, Akhil, Jassi Gill, Nimrat Khaira, Sunanda Sharma, Kulwinder Billa, Mankirt Aulakh and Prabh Gill.

== Discography ==
S.No	Song	Artists	Ref.
1	Gurpurab	Ranjit Bawa	
2	Sher Maarna	Ranjit Bawa	
3	Tankha	Ranjit Bawa	
4	Jaa Ve Mundeya	Ranjit Bawa	
5	Kankan	Ranjit Bawa	
6	Zindgi	Akhil	
7	Akh Lagdi	Akhil	
8	Yaar Jaat De	Jassi Gill, Babbal Rai	
9	Nakhre	Jassi Gill	
10	Vich Pardeshan	Jassi Gill	
11	Pekeya Nu	Roshan Prince	
12	Sochde Nhi	Yuvraj Hans	
13	Mere Yaar	Kulwinder Billa	
14	Milne Di Rutt	Gurshabad	
15	Kadar	Mankirt Aulakh	
16	Khayal	Mankirt Aulakh	
17	Tere Lyii	Babbal Rai	
18	Uche Uche Kad	Babbal Rai	
19	Bhangra Thok Thok Ke	Babbal Rai	
20	Brober Bol	Nimrat Khaira	
21	Shukar Dateya	Prabh Gill	
22	Tamanna	Prabh Gill	
23	Love You Oye	Prabh Gill	
24	Cheta Tera	Sajjan Adeeb	
25	Ishqa De Lekhe 2	Sajjan Adeeb	
26	Yaaran Nu	Navv Indrr	
27	Kach	Navv Indrr	
28	Sohne Sohne	Mohana Bhogaraju	
29	Haar Jaani Aa	Mehtab Virk	
30	Yaara Ve	Mehtab Virk	
31	Ae Kash	Babbal Rai	
32	Pathar	Navraj Hans	
33	Bekadra	Sippy Gill	
34	Pyaar Ni Ghatda	Sippy Gill	
35	End Combination	Sweetaj Brar	
36	Nakhreya Wali	Sweetaj Brar	
37	Raah Puchhda	Sweetaj Brar	
38	Peen Da Chaska	Harish Verma	
39	Pehla Pyaar	Harish Verma	
40	Deewana	Akhil	

== Awards and nominations ==
Year	Song	Award	Category	Result	Ref.
2015	Haar Jani Aa	PTC Punjabi Music Awards	Best Music Director For Single	Won	
2015	"Replay - The Return of Melody"	PTC Punjabi Music Awards	Best Music Director For An Album	Nominated	
2017	Kadar	PTC Punjabi Music Awards	Most Popular Song of The Year	Won	
2017	Tere Bina	PTC Punjabi Music Awards	Best Director For Single	Nominated	
2018	Tareyan De Des	PTC Punjabi Music Awards	Best Music Director For Single	Nominated	
2017	Kadar	Mirchi Music awards	Best Music Director	Nominated	
