= Oh Yaara Ainvayi Ainvayi Lut Gaya =

2015 film directed by Raj Sinha

- Directed by: Raj Sinha
- Written by: Raj Sinha
- Produced by: Mukesh Sharma; Khushwant Singh
- Starring: Jassi Gill; Gauahar Khan
- Cinematography: Devang Desai
- Edited by: Abhishek Seth
- Music by: Jatinder Shah
- Production companies: Father & Son Films
- Release date: 22 May 2015
- Country: India
- Language: Punjabi

Oh Yaara Ainvayi Ainvayi Lut Gaya is a 2015 Punjabi romantic comedy film written and directed by Raj Sinha. It stars Jassi Gill and Gauahar Khan. The film was released on 22 May 2015.

== Cast ==
- Jassi Gill as Ranveer Singh
- Gauahar Khan as Gunjan Kaur
- Rana Ranbir as Gunjan's lawyer
- Karamjit Anmol as Ranveer's lawyer
- B.N. Sharma as Daulat Singh (Judge)
- Kadambari Jethwani as Jaspreet (cameo)

== Release ==
The film was theatrically released on 22 May 2015.

=== Home Media Release ===
The film is now accessible for streaming on the Chaupal OTT app.

== Opening weekend box office in the UK ==
In the UK, Oh Yaara Ainvayi Ainvayi Lut Gaya garnered £9,326 in box-office receipts in its opening weekend.
