= Kya Meri Sonam Gupta Bewafa Hai? =

2021 film by Ssaurabh Tyagi

Kya Meri Sonam Gupta Bewafa Hai:::Nhi.
- Promotional poster
- Directed by: Ssaurabh Tyagi
- Written by: Ssaurabh Tyagi
- Produced by: Dhaval Jayantilal Gada; Aksshay Jayantilal Gada
- Starring: Jassie Gill; Surbhi Jyoti
- Cinematography: R M Sswamy
- Edited by: Sailessh Dubey
- Music by: Score: Amar Mohile; Songs: Rahul Mishra; Rochak Kohli; Payal Dev; Avvy Sra
- Production company: Pen Studios
- Distributed by: ZEE5
- Release date: 10 September 2021
- Running time: 136 minutes
- Country: India
- Language: Hindi

Kya Meri Sonam Gupta Bewafa Hai? (lit. Is my Sonam Gupta unfaithful?) is a 2021 Indian Hindi-language comedy film written and directed by Ssaurabh Tyagi and produced by Dhaval Jayantilal Gada and Aksshay Jayantilal Gada under the banner Pen India Limited. It features Jassie Gill and Surbhi Jyoti in lead roles. Alongside late Surekha Sikri, Vijay Raaz, Kaviraj Laique, Brijendra Kala and Atul Shrivastava. The film premiered on 10 September 2021 on ZEE5.

== Cast ==
- Jassie Gill as Sintu
- Surbhi Jyoti as Sonam Gupta
- Surekha Sikri as Dadi
- Vijay Raaz as Sanjeev Nagraj
- Kaviraj Laique as Kundan
- Brijendra Kala as Sonam's father
- Atul Shrivastava as Sintu's father
- Rajesh Sharma as Travel Agent
- Saaki Wani as Sintu's friend
- Manjeet Singh Rathore as Sintu's friend

== Soundtrack ==
Kya Meri Sonam Gupta Bewafa Hai?

Soundtrack album by Rahul Mishra, Rochak Kohli, Payal Dev and Avvy Sra
- Released: 7 September 2021
- Recorded: 2020
- Genre: Feature film soundtrack
- Length: 21:09
- Language: Hindi
- Label: Saregama Music

The songs featured in the film are composed by Rahul Mishra, Rochak Kohli, Payal Dev and Avvy Sra while lyrics are written by Happy Raikoti, Manoj Muntashir and Rahul Mishra.

Track listing
No.	Title	Lyrics	Music	Singer(s)	Length
1.	"Leke Pehla Pehla Pyaar"	Happy Raikoti	Avvy Sra	Jassie Gill, Simran Kaur	2:54
2.	"Kuch Paas Mere"	Manoj Muntashir	Rahul Mishra	Jubin Nautiyal	3:23
3.	"Dil Pe Phod du"	Manoj Muntashir	Rahul Mishra	Rahul Mishra	3:37
4.	"Aur Is Dil Mein"	Kunaal Vermaa	Rahul Mishra	Rahul Mishra	4:39
5.	"Besharam Aashiq"	Manoj Muntashir	Rahul Mishra	Rahul Mishra, Payal Dev, Romi	3:36
6.	"Wallpaper Maiyya Ka"	Manoj Muntashir	Payal Dev	Payal Dev, Divya Kumar	3:00
Total length:					21:09
