= 5 Weddings =

- Directed by: Namrata Singh Gujral
- Produced by: Namrata Singh Gujral
- Starring: Nargis Fakhri; Rajkummar Rao; Bo Derek; Candy Clark; Anneliese van der Pol
- Cinematography: Christo Bakalov, BAC
- Edited by: Steve Mirkovich
- Music by: Christopher French
- Production company: Uniglobe Entertainment
- Release dates: 10 May 2018 (Cannes Film Festival); 26 October 2018 (India)
- Running time: 90 minutes
- Countries: United States; India; Canada
- Languages: Hindi; English
- Box office: $26,980 (20 lakhs)

5 Weddings is a 2018 American film set in the United States and India. Directed by Namrata Singh Gujral, the film features Nargis Fakhri, Rajkummar Rao, Bo Derek, Candy Clark, Anneliese Van der Pol and Suvinder Vicy.

== Plot ==
An American journalist travels to India for a magazine feature on multiple Indian wedding ceremonies. The film also deals with the community of transgender people called hijra who dance at these weddings.

== Cast ==
- Nargis Fakhri as Shania Dhaliwal
- Rajkummar Rao as Harbhajan Singh
- Bo Derek as Mandy Singh Dhaliwal
- Candy Clark as Claudia Burrell
- Anneliese van der Pol as Whitney Simmons
- Shiwani Saini as Devika
- Suvinder Vicky as Police Commissioner Mr. Gill
- Saru Maini as Bhavna
- Mariana Vicente as Alexa DuPont
- Dawn Richard as Lydia Duniyer
- Diljott as Harleen
- Robert Palmer Watkins as Mark Cottell

== Production ==
=== Background ===
The film was initially set to be filmed in 2008 with Namrata Singh Gujral and Harbhajan Mann in the lead. Due to her ten-year journey with cancer, Gujral ended up directing the film with Nargis Fakhri playing the lead role of Shania Dhaliwal and Rajkummar Rao playing the role of Harbhajan Singh. Rajkummar Rao's character was initially called Rahul but was changed to Harbhajan when Harbhajan Mann was being considered to play the lead.

=== Locations ===
The film has been shot in Los Angeles, Hollywood, Burbank and in Chandigarh, Mohali and Mani Majra.

== Soundtrack ==
5 Weddings

Soundtrack album by Vibhas, Vishal Mishra and Viplove Rajdeo
- Released: 23 October 2018
- Recorded: 2018
- Genre: Feature film soundtrack
- Length: 17:17
- Language: Hindi
- Label: T-Series
External audio
- Official Audio Jukebox on YouTube

All lyrics are written by Abhendra Kumar Upadhyay.

Track listing
No.	Title	Music	Singer(s)	Length
1.	"Na Chah Ke Bhi"	Vishal Mishra	Vishal Mishra, Shirley Setia	4:26
2.	"American Beauty"	Vibhas	Mika Singh, Prakriti Kakar, Miss Pooja, Kaur Sisters	3:11
3.	"Baaki Hai"	Vibhas	Sonu Nigam, Shreya Ghoshal	4:29
4.	"Taareef"	Vibhas	Palak Muchhal, Rommy Tahli, Rockon Tanuj	2:01
5.	"Laung Gawacha"	Viplove Rajdeo	Saru Maini, Arnie B	3:10
Total length:				17:17

== Release ==
The film is banned in Kuwait and Qatar because of the hijra / transgender angle and has undergone extensive censorship in India, Malaysia and several other countries.
