= Sukhe =

Indian singer-songwriter and music producer lyricist

Sukhe Muzical Doctorz
- Born: Sukhdeep Singh; Punjab, India
- Genres: Pop, Bhangra, R&B, mumble rap
- Occupations: Singer-Songwriter; Rapper; Music producer
- Instruments: Vocals, fl studio12, cubase 7.5 pro
- Years active: 2014–present
- Labels: Speed Records, T-Series, Desi Music Factory, Desi Melodies

Sukhdeep Singh, better known by his stage name Sukh-E and Sukh-E Muzical Doctorz, is an Indian singer-songwriter and music producer associated with Punjabi and Hindi-language songs. He debuted his first single "Sniper" featuring Raftaar. His 2015 single "Jaguar" featuring Bohemia was written by lyricist Jaani.

== Early life and career ==
Sukhdeep hails from Garhshankar, Punjab, India. He went to Chandigarh for higher studies and after his graduation, he founded a band Muzical Doctorz.

He split with Preet Hundal but continued on with the name Muzical Doctorz, under which he signed new singers and rappers. "All through my college life, I had a great inclination towards music. I used to participate in various music competitions and perform in college fests. I had full support from my friends and girlfriend and that gave me the confidence to build a niche for ‘Muzical Doctorz’. I enjoyed my college life in proper ‘punjabi-style’ and that fun is reflected through my songs." said Sukh-E.

He debuted with song Sniper feat. Raftaar, Sukh-e gained popularity by releasing the single "Jaguar" with Bohemia. He again collaborated on another single "All Black" with Raftaar. Later Sukh-E was featured in various songs like "Club Pub", "FOCUS", and "Coka".

== Discography ==
Year	Song	Artist	Music	Lyrics	Label
2012	Kalyug	A-Kay Ft . Bling Singh	Sukh-E Muzical Doctorz	Preet Hundal	Saga Hits
2013	Munda iPhone Warga	A-Kay Ft. Bling Singh	Sukh-E Muzical Doctorz	Preet Hundal	Lokdhun
2013	Chadd Gayi	Guru Randhawa	Sukh-E Muzical Doctorz	Guru Randhawa	Speed Records
2014	Sniper	Sukh-E Muzical Doctorz, Raftaar	Sukh-E Muzical Doctorz	Sukhe, Big Dhillon, Raftaar, J Swag	Speed Records
2014	Yaari	Maninder Buttar	Sukh-E Muzical Doctorz	Sharry Mann	Yaaranmulle Records
2015	Jaguar	Sukh-E Muzical Doctorz, Bohemia	Sukh-E Muzical Doctorz	Jaani	Speed Records
2015	All Black	Sukh-E Muzical Doctorz, Raftaar	Sukh-E Muzical Doctorz	Jaani	T-Series
2016	Suicide	Sukh-E Muzical Doctorz	B Praak	Jaani	T-Series
2016	Shikwa	Mani Dhillon, Sukh-E Muzical Doctorz	M.Vee.	Sukh-E Muzical Doctorz	Juke Dock
2017	Insane	Sukh-E Muzical Doctorz	Muzical Doctorz	Jaani	White Hill Music
2017	Superstar	Sukh-E Muzical Doctorz, Divya Bhatt	Sukh-E Muzical Doctorz	Jaani	T-Series
2017	Changey Din	Kambi Rajpuria	Sukh E	Kambi Rajpuria	
2017	Janni Tera Naa	Sunanda Sharma	Sukh-E Muzical Doctorz, Avvy Sra	Jaani	Amar Audio
2018	Gallan Teriyan	Ammy Virk	Muzical Doctorz	Jaani	Speed Records
2018	BAMB	Sukh-E Muzical Doctorz, Badshah	Sukh-E Muzical Doctorz	Jaani	T-Series
2018	Mill Lo Na	Guri, Satti Dhillon	Sukh-E Muzical Doctorz	Jaani	Geet MP3
2018	Billian Billian	Guri	Sukh-E Muzical Doctorz	Guri	Geet MP3
2018	Nikle Currant	Jassi Gill, Neha Kakkar	Sukh-E Muzical Doctorz	Jaani	T-Series
2018	Pasand Jatt Di	Ammy Virk	Sukh-E Muzical Doctorz	Jaani	Speed Records
2018	Tru Talk	Jassi Gill, Karan Aujla	Sukh-E Muzical Doctorz	Karan Aujla	Speed Records
2018	Morni	Sunanda Sharma	Sukh-E Muzical Doctorz	Jaani	Amar Audio
2018	Nikkle Current	Jassie Gill, Neha Kakkar	Sukh-E Muzical Doctorz	Jaani	T-Series
2018	20 Saal	Kambi Rajpuria	Sukh-E Muzical Doctorz	Kambi Rajpuria	Unknown Record Label
2018	Coka	Sukh E	Sukh-E Muzical Doctorz	Jaani	Desi Melodies
2018	I Need Ya	Sukhe	B Praak	Jaani	Sony Music India
2019	Jaani Ve Jaani	Afsana Khan	Sukh E, Avvy Sra	Jaani	Desi Melodies
2019	Wah Wai Wah	Sukh E Muzical Doctorz, Neha Kakkar	Sukh E	Jaani	T-Series
2019	Dil Mangdi	Jazzy B, Apache Indian	Sukh E	Jaani	Speed Records
2019	Duji Vaar Pyaar	Sunanda Sharma	Sukh E	Jaani	Mad 4 Music
2019	Where Baby Where	Gippy Grewal	Sukh E	Jaani	Humble Music
2020	Oye Hoye	Suke E Muzical Doctorz, Mellow D	Sukh E	Sukh E	Sukh-E
2020	Video Bana De	Sukh E Muzical Doctorz, Aashta Gill	Sukh E	Jaani	Sony Music India
2020	Ghar Aaja	Sukh-E, Pardhaan	Sukh-E	Pardhaan	Parichay Records
2020	Banglow	Avvy Sra, Afsana Khan	Sukh-E, Avvy Sra	Jaani	Desi Melodies
2021	Sona Lagda	Prakiti-Sukriti Kakkar, Sukh-E	Sukh-E, Bharrat- Suarabh		VYRL Originals
2021	Patli Kamariya	Tanishk Bagchi, Parampara Tandon	Tanishk Bagchi	Tansihk Bagchi	T-Series
2021	DJ Thoda Bass Bada Do	Badshah, Aastha Gill, Mellow D (composer)	Mellow D	Mellow D	T-Series
2021	Focus	Sukh-E, Ikka	Sukh-E	Sukh-E, Mehabin	Saregama
2021	Mere Warga	Kaka	Sukh-E	Kaka	Times Music
2021	Laare X Sajna Ve Sajna	Musahib, Sukhe	Sukh-E Muzical Doctorz, Muzik Amy	Musahib	T-Series
2021	Coco	Sukh-E	Sukh-E, Avvy Sra, Mehabin	Jaani	Desi Melodies
