= Bapu Zimidar =

Song by Jassie Gill
- Language: Punjabi
- Released: 14 October 2014
- Genre: Indian pop • Bhangra
- Length: 3:45
- Label: Speed Records
- Lyricist(s): Happy Raikoti
- Producer(s): Balvinder Singh

Music video
- "Bapu Zimidar" on YouTube

Bapu Zimidar is a Punjabi song by Jassie Gill. The song was written by Happy Raikoti and music was composed by Jatinder Shah. This music video was directed by Virsa Arts. The song was released on 14 October 2014 under the label Speed Records. The song appeared in the UK Asian Music Chart (BBC) and Apple Music India Daily Chart. Bapu Zimidar has crossed 621 Million views on YouTube May 2025.

== Personnel ==
- Song: Bapu Zimidar
- Artist: Jassie Gill
- Lyrics: Happy Raikoti
- Music: Jatinder Shah
- Video Director: Virsa Arts
- Label: Speed Records
