= Happy Raikoti =

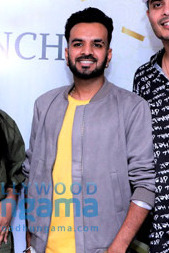

Background information
- Occupations: Singer, lyricist, actor
- Years active: 2011–present

Happy Raikoti is an Indian singer, lyricist and actor associated with Punjabi music. He made his singing debut with the song "Jaan" in 2014. His album "7 Knaalan" was released in 2015. Recently he has appeared in the movie Teshan.

== Discography ==
=== As lead artist ===
Year	Album/Single Track	Music director	Record label
2014	Jaan	Laddi Gill	Lokhdun Punjabi
2015	Shagna Di Tyaari	Laddi Gill	Speed Records
2015	7 Kanaalan ( Album )	Laddi Gill	Speed Records
2016	Crazy Demands	Desi Crew	Speed Records
2016	Main Tan V Pyaar Karda	Millind Gaba	Speed Records
2016	Mutiyaar	Laddi Gill	Speed Records
2017	Big Dreams	Deep Jandu	Lokdhun Punjabi
2017	Pagal	Goldboy	Humble Music
2018	Pegg Shegg	V Raxx	White Hill Music
2018	Akhian	Goldboy	White Hill Music
2018	Top Top	Laddi Gill	White Hill Music
2018	Nikke Nikke Khaab	Laddi Gill	Boomboxx Music
2018	Main Ja Maa	Ikky	White Hill Music
2019	Bai Hood	Ikky	Jass Records
2019	Zinda	Goldboy	White Hill Music
2019	Pyaar Ni Karna	Snappy	Speed Records
2020	Zamaana	Laddi Gill	Jass Records
2020	Wahguru	Laddi Gill	Happy Raikoti
2021	Pyaar Kari Jaane O	Avvy Sra	Pellet Drum Records
2021	Mohabattan	Laddi Gill	White Hill Music
2021	Addiction	Mxrci	Happy Raikoti
2021	Maa Da Dil	Laddi Gill	Happy Raikoti
2021	Zinda Aa Mai	Avvy Sra	Worldwide Punjabi

=== Popular singles as lyricist ===
Year	Album/Single Track	Singer	Music director	Record label
2014	Vehaam	Roshan Prince	Desi Crew	Speed Records
2014	Dairy ( from album "Judaa 2" )	Amrinder Gill	Dr. Zeus	Speed Records
2014	Gunday Returns	Dilpreet Dhillon	Desi Crew	Speed Records
2014	Dus Mint	Sippy Gill	Laddi Gill	Speed Records
2014	Desi Rockstar 2 ( Album )	Gippy Grewal	Jatinder Shah	Speed Records
2014	Dil Darda	Roshan Prince	Laddi Gill	Black Studio Canada
2014	Bapu Zimidar	Jassie Gill	Jatinder Shah	Speed Records
2015	Laden	Jassie Gill	Gupz Sehra	JRS Music
2015	Kitte Kalli	Maninder Buttar	Preet Hundal	Paanj-Aab Records
2016	Jatti De Nain	Roshan Prince	Millind Gaba	Times Music
2016	Teri Kami	Akhil	BOB	Speed Records
2017	Sohnea	Miss Pooja	Millind Gaba	Speed Records
2017	5–7 Yaar	Karan Randhawa	Laddi Gill	Jass Records
2017	Kaali Hummer	Maninder Buttar	Deep Jandu	White Hill Music
2017	Pasand	Miss Pooja	Dj Dips	Saga Hits
2018	Designer	Nimrat Khaira	Deep Jandu	Humble Music
2018	Mude Marr Jaange	Raghveer Boli, Bohemia	Jay K	Bohemia
2018	Double Cross	Ammy Virk	Ikky	Speed Records
2019	Sohnea 2	Miss Pooja	Millind Gaba	Speed Records
2019	Main Teri Ho Gayi Aa	Millind Gaba	Millind Gaba	Speed Records
2020	Miss You	Gippy Grewal	Enzo	Humble Music
2020	Me and You	Gippy Grewal	Desi Crew	T-Series
2020	Taare	Diljit Dosanjh	Intense	Diljit Dosanjh
2020	Sone Di Dabbi	Gippy Grewal	Desi Crew	Music Builderzz
2020	Pyaar Mangdi	Jassie Gill, Happy Raikoti	Avvy Sra	Jassie Gill
2020	• Sharaab • Aish Aa (From album "The Main Man"	Gippy Grewal	Deep Jandu	Geet MP3
2020	Jaan	Gurnam Bhullar	Sharry Nexus	Jass Records
2020	Taare Baliye	Ammy Virk	Avvy Sra	Burfi Music
2021	Khabbi Seat	Ammy Virk	Mix Singh	Burfi Music
2021	Oye Hoye Hoye	Jassie Gill	Avvy Sra	T- Series
2021	Be Ready	Ninja	Desi Crew	Happy Raikoti
2021	Mannda E Ni	Dj Flow	Avvy Sra	Hashtag Records
2021	Kade Kade	Ammy Virk	Avvy Sra	T- Series
2021	Tere Laare	Afsana Khan	Desi Crew	DC Studioz
2021	Hathyar 2	Gippy Grewal, Manpreet Kaur	Laddi Gill	Humble Music

== Lyricist in movies ==
=== Punjabi ===
Year	Movie
2014	Jatt James Bond
2015	Angrej
2015	Dildariyaan
2016	Ambarsariya
2016	Love Punjab
2016	Ardaas
2016	Dulla Bhatti
2016	Main Teri Tu Mera
2016	Tiger
2016	Lock
2016	Darra
2016	Nikka Zaildar
2017	Sarvann
2017	Manje Bistre
2018	Golak Bugni Bank Te Batua
2019	Shadaa
2019	Ardaas Karaan
2020	Ik Sandhu Hunda Si
2021	Puaada
2022	Sher Bagga

=== Hindi ===
Year	Movie
2021	Sardar Ka Grandson
2021	Kya Meri Sonam Gupta Bewafa Hai?
