= Nikle Currant =

Single by Neha Kakkar and Jassi Gill

Single by Neha Kakkar and Jassi Gill
- Language: Punjabi
- Released: 11 October 2018
- Genre: Dance music; Indian pop; Bhangra
- Length: 3:34
- Label: T-Series
- Composer: Jaani
- Lyricist: Jaani
- Producer: Bhushan Kumar

Music video
- "Nikle Currant" on YouTube

"Nikle Currant" is a Punjabi song written by Jaani and sung by Neha Kakkar and Jassi Gill. The song is directed by Arvind Khaira and music given by Sukh-E.

== Music video ==
The music video titled "Nikle Currant" was released by T-Series on YouTube. It has received 10 million views on YouTube in first 24 hours. As of March 2025 video has over 920 million views on YouTube. It is one of the fastest Punjabi songs to cross 204 million views on YouTube.

== Background ==
The song title "Nikle Currant" which means "Electric Shock Comes Out", the video is about Jassi Gill proposing Neha Kakkar.

== Reception ==
The song was Chartbuster as it was Trending worldwide at position 4 on YouTube Billboard charts for 8 weeks.

== Charts ==
Chart (2018–19)	Peak position	References
UK Asian | BBC Asian Network	1	
