= Abohar Branch =

Canal in Punjab, India

Coordinates: 30°11′N 74°10′E

The Abohar Branch is a canal branch of the Sirhind Canal that irrigates much of the western area of the Malwa region of Punjab, India. It is 109.75 kilometres (68.20 mi) long and has a discharge of 3,027 cubic feet per second (85.7 m^{3}/s).

The Abohar Branch Lower section is 46.37 kilometres (28.81 mi) long and has a discharge of 1,693 cubic feet per second (47.9 m^{3}/s). It runs parallel to the Sutlej in Ludhiana, Moga, Faridkot, and Firozpur districts, terminating at Govindgarh after 202.7 kilometres (126.0 mi).

It originates from the Combined Branch of the Sirhind Canal, that departs toward the west, with the Combined Branch splitting into the northern Abohar Branch and the southern Bhatinda Branch. It was constructed between 1867–83 during the British colonial period of Punjab, mainly irrigating areas of Punjab under direct British administration rather than those under the administration of local princely states. It had many associated distributaries, which provided water to the various villages of the areas in flowed near.

Forty-eight miles of the Abohar Branch had locks on the falls. At the 48th mile of the Abohar Branch, a navigation canal branches off toward the Sutlej near Firozpur, with a four mile long distributary of it providing water to Firozpur itself. The branch, which begins at 4,824 cubic feet per second (136.6 m^{3}/s), has been remodelled to be reduced to 2,803 cubic feet per second (79.4 m^{3}/s). Some parts of the branch have since been transferred to the Sirhind Feeder.

The branch's water is polluted, with the source of the pollution being blamed on the Buddha Nullah, which feeds into the Sirhind Feeder, which in-turn leads into the Abohar Branch.
