= Shavinder Mahal =

Indian actor, anchor and movie director (born 1957)

Shivendra Mahal
- Born: Punjab, India
- Years active: 1988 - present

Shavinder Mahal (born in 1957 in Ropar) is an Indian actor, anchor and movie director. He began his career with serials like his dual role portrayal of Parashurama and Shiva in the mega-epic Mahabharat (1988). He has done many serials in Hindi as well as in his mother language Punjabi. He has directed the film Panchhtawa in 1996. He acted in more than 30 Punjabi & Hindi films. His famous Punjabi language films include Baaghi Soormey (1993), Putt Sardaran De, Vidroh, Main Maa Punjab Dee (National Award winner film Directed by Balwant Dullat), etc.

== Filmography ==
- Taakre Jattan De (1991)
- Baghi Soormey (1993) .... Sucha Singh
- Putt Sardaran De (1993)
- Deson Pardes (1998)
- Main Maa Punjab Dee (1998) (Written and Directed by Balwant Dullat )
- Ishq Nachave Gali Gali (2001) (Directed by Balwant Dullat )
- Vidroh (2006)
- Rustam-e-Hind (2006)
- Jag Jeondyan De Mele (2009)
- Dharti (2011)
- Mel Karade Rabba (2011)
- Jihne Mera Dil Lutya (2011)
- Yaar Anmulle (2011)
- Yaaran Naal Bahaaran 2 (2012)
- Welcome To Punjab
- Punjab Bolda Hai
- Tu Mera Bhai Main Tera Bhai
- Saadi Vakhri E Shann
- Mallu Singh (Malayalam Film) (2012)
- Rangeeley (2013)
- Love Yoou Soniye (2013)
- Yaaran Naal Baharaan 2
- Fir Mammla Gadbar Gadbar
- Gaddaar:The Traitor
- Hero Naam Yaad Rakhi
- Shagna Di Tyari (Music Video)
- Ambarsariya (2016)
- Teshan (2016)
- Jawaani Jaaneman (2020)
