= Sichewali =

Sichewal
- Village
- Location in Punjab, India Sichewal (India)
- Coordinates: 31.155098°N 75.2877965°E
- Country: India
- State: Punjab
- District: Jalandhar
- Tehsil: Shahkot

Government
  - Type: Panchayat raj
  - Body: Gram panchayat
- Elevation: 240 m (790 ft)

Population (2011)
  - Total: 1,270
- Sex ratio 626/644 ♂/♀

Languages
  - Official: Punjabi
- Time zone: UTC+5:30 (IST)
- ISO 3166 code: IN-PB
- Vehicle registration: PB- 08
- Website: jalandhar.nic.in

Sichewali is a village in Shahkot in Jalandhar district of Punjab State, India. It is located 12 kilometres (7.5 mi) from Shahkot, 20 kilometres (12 mi) from Nakodar, 36 kilometres (22 mi) from district headquarter Jalandhar and 174 kilometres (108 mi) from state capital Chandigarh. The village is administrated by a sarpanch who is an elected representative of village as per Panchayati raj (India).

== Demography ==
As of 2011, the village has a total number of 238 houses and a population of 1270 of which include 626 are males while 644 are females according to the report published by Census India in 2011. The literacy rate of the village is 74.98%, lower than state average of 75.84%. The population of children under the age of 6 years is 139 which is 10.94% of total population of the village, and child sex ratio is approximately 1044 higher than the state average of 846.

Most of the people are from Schedule Caste which constitutes 23.78% of total population in the village. The town does not have any Schedule Tribe population so far.

As per census 2011, 330 people were engaged in work activities out of the total population of the village which includes 309 males and 21 females. According to census survey report 2011, 93.94% workers describe their work as main work and 6.06% workers are involved in marginal activity providing livelihood for less than 6 months.

== Transport ==
Shahkot Malisian station is the nearest train station. The village is 81 kilometres (50 mi) away from domestic airport in Ludhiana and the nearest international airport is located in Chandigarh also Sri Guru Ram Dass Jee International Airport is the second nearest airport which is 101 kilometres (63 mi) away in Amritsar.

== Model Village ==
The village Sichewali was chosen as a model village by the Ministry of Water Resources, River Development, and Ganga Re-juvenation for possible emulation in terms of sewage treatment capacity, waste management, and public toilets, in over 1,600 locations along the Ganges. The village stands out in its efficiency in tackling issues leading to river pollution.

== See also ==
- List of villages in India
