= Akalgarh, Phagwara =

Akalgarh
- Village
- Location in Punjab, India Akalgarh (India)
- Coordinates: 31.224020°N 75.770801°E
- Country: India
- State: Punjab
- District: Kapurthala

Government
  - Type: Panchayati raj (India)
  - Body: Gram panchayat

Population (2011)
  - Total: 1,104
- Sex ratio 561/543♂/♀

Languages
  - Official: Punjabi
  - Other spoken: Hindi
- Time zone: UTC+5:30 (IST)
- PIN: 144401
- Telephone code: 01822
- ISO 3166 code: IN-PB
- Vehicle registration: PB-09
- Website: kapurthala.gov.in

Akalgarh is a village in Tehsil Phagwara, Kapurthala district, in Punjab, India. It is located 5 kilometres (3.1 mi) away from sub-district headquarter Phagwara and 45 km away from district headquarter Kapurthala. The village is administrated by a Sarpanch, who is an elected representative.

== Demography ==
According to the report published by Census India in 2011, Akalgarh has 228 houses with the total population of 1,104 persons of which 561 are male and 543 females. Literacy rate of Akalgarh is 80.39%, higher than the state average of 75.84%. The population of children in the age group 0–6 years is 140 which is 12.68% of the total population. Child sex ratio is approximately 892, higher than the state average of 846.

== Population data ==
Particulars	Total	Male	Female
Total No. of Houses	228	-	-
Population	1,104	561	543
Child (0–6)	140	74	66
Schedule Caste	619	318	301
Schedule Tribe	0	0	0
Literacy	80.39 %	85.01 %	75.68 %
Total Workers	332	299	33
Main Worker	216	0	0
Marginal Worker	116	95	21

== Transport ==
Mandhali Railway Station, Phagwara Junction Railway Station are the nearby railway stations to Akalgarh. Jalandhar City Rail Way Station is 25 km away from the village. The village is 120 km away from Sri Guru Ram Dass Jee International Airport in Amritsar. Another nearby airport is Sahnewal Airport in Ludhiana which is located 45 km away from the village.
