= Kali Bein =

Indian rivulet

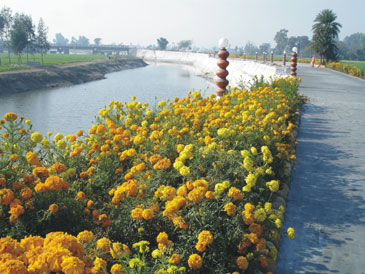
Kali Bein river

Kali Bein is a rivulet in Punjab, India that flows into the confluence of the rivers Beas and Satluj at Harike. Guru Nanak attained enlightenment after taking a bath in the Kali Bein, and despite its religious history in Sikhism, the rivulet is not considered holy by the Sikhs in Punjab, as no bodies of water are considered holy in Sikhism aside from the Sikh Sarovars (pools of water within gurdwaras) of Gurdwaras (Sikh Temples). In the wake of the Green Revolution and the rise of chemical pesticides, the Kali Bein became progressively polluted until it was cleaned and rejuvenated in a mass action led by Sant Balbir Singh Seechewal in the 2000s.

== Etymology ==
Kali Bein literally means the Black Stream. It is called Kali ('black') due to the black colour reflected by the minerals in its waters. The Punjabi word 'bein' derives from the Sanskrit 'veni' meaning a stream or a water body. Beins are a feature of the plains and are marked by their zigzagging course.

== Course ==
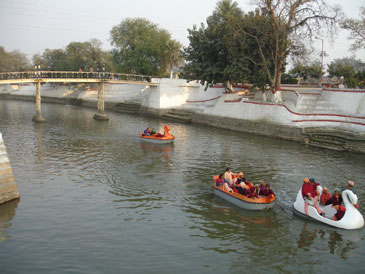
Kali Bein at present

The Kali Bein rises from a spring in the Dhanoa village of Dasuya tehsil Hoshiarpur district of Punjab, India. Odhra rivulet, and Mukerian Hydel Channel are the main source of water for Kali Bein. After flowing for 160 km, it merges at the confluence of the Beas and the Satluj at Harike Pattan. The Kali Bein is also called the Western Bein in Hoshiarpur and its course lies parallel to the Beas in the Hoshiarpur and Kapurthala districts. The Kali Bein is also thought to be the abandoned riverbed of the Beas and its depth varies from 1.5 to 3 metres. The Bein's spring was brick lined during the Emperor Akbar's reign. The Chhoti Bein is a tributary of the Kali Bein. The Kali Bein flows through the districts of Hoshiarpur, Kapurthala and Jalandhar and there are several towns on its banks including Kapurthala and Sultanpur Lodhi. The Mukerian Hydel Channel at Terkiana is a major waterworks on the Bein that controls the flow of water downstream. The Kali Bein has a catchment area covering 945 square kilometers.

== Sikhism ==
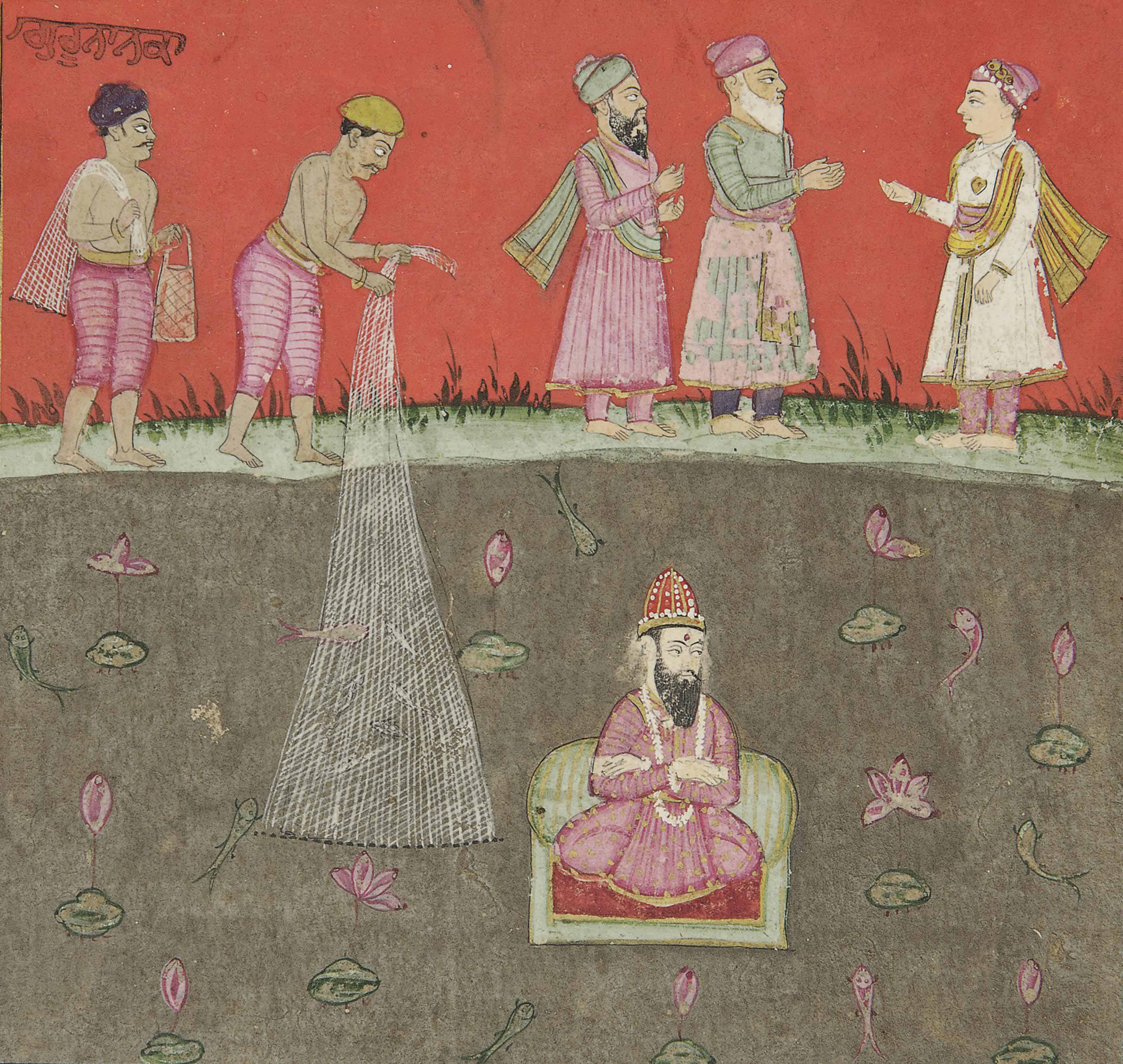
Janamsakhi painting depicting the search-and-rescue mission launched to recover Guru Nanak from the Kali Bein, circa late 18th or early 19th-century.

Guru Nanak Dev Ji, the founder of Sikhism, is believed to have attained enlightenment after taking a dip in the Kali Bein. Guru Nanak Dev Ji is said to have disappeared while bathing in the Bein only to reappear three days later. Guru Nanak Dev Ji then proclaimed that "There is no Hindu and there is no Musalman. There is only one God and all are equal before Him". The moolmantra of Sikhism, Ik Onkar, originated from this experience. The Gurdwara Sri Ber Sahib, where Guru Nanak Dev Ji used to meditate under a ber tree, is located on the Kali Bein's banks in Sultanpur Lodhi.

== Ecological concerns ==
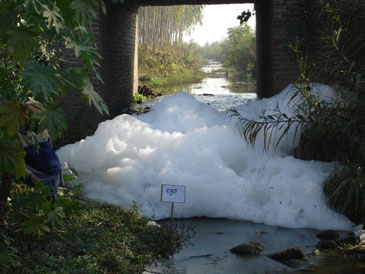
Photograph of a polluted Kali Bein producing white foam

Kali Bein plays a key role in recharging the water table and in flood management in its watershed. It is also a key source of irrigation for the agricultural fields there. The Kanjli Wetland, a Ramsar site (a wetland site designated of international importance under the Ramsar Convention), is supported by the Kali Bein. As a result of the Green Revolution, the use of industrial and agricultural chemicals and the exploitation of groundwater led to the drying up of the Kali Bein along parts of its course and the contamination of groundwater leading to diseases and the drying up of farmlands.

== Clean up ==
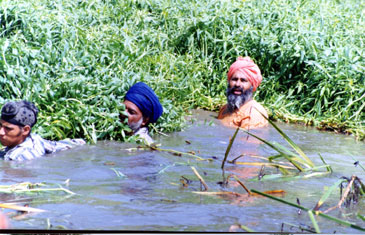
Cleaning of the Kali Bein

The clean up of the Kali Bein was led by Sant Balbir Singh Seechewal who organised a kar sewa and roped in the Government of Punjab. Seechewal's efforts involved the clearing of water hyacinth and other weeds from the Bein, the building of bathing ghats and the construction of a road along the Bein. The kar sewa began in 2000 and till 2003 focused on cleaning up the Kali Bein near Sultanpur Lodhi after which the focus shifted to cleaning up the Bein between Dhanoa and the Kanjli wetland. Seechewal often referred to the Guru Granth Sahib and its verses exhorting the preservation of natural resources in his appeals for cleaning the Bein. 3000 volunteers a day worked under Seechewal for three and a half years to accomplish the revival of the Bein. It directly led to a rise in the water table and the reusability of hand pumps that had remained dry for several decades. Further, these efforts have contributed to eliminating the problem of water logging in the Kali Bein's upstream areas and improved the availability of water in its downstream areas resulting in improved irrigation and better crops.

Despite Seechewal's success, the Kali Bein has continued to suffer in recent years. Inadequate release of water from Mukerian Hydel Channel, the flow back of polluted water from Harike and the failure of sewage treatment plants led to the mass death of fishes in the Kali Bein in 2013.

On 17 July 2022, while on a visit to mark the 22nd anniversary of the river's cleaning, Punjab Chief Minister Bhagwant Mann consumed a glass of water directly from the river in Sultanpur Lodhi. Two days later he was admitted to a hospital, reportedly, suffering from a stomach infection. He was discharged a day later. While it was speculated that his visit to the hospital was caused by a stomach infection from drinking polluted water, official sources denied this and claimed it was a routine health check-up.
