= Akalgarh, Ludhiana =

Akalgarh
- Town
- Location in Punjab, India Akalgarh (India)
- Coordinates: 30.759143°N 75.650634°E
- Country: India
- State: Punjab
- District: Ludhiana

Government
  - Type: Municipal corporation
  - Body: Nagar Palika
- Elevation: 214 m (702 ft)

Population (2011)
  - Total: 7,678

Languages
  - Official: Punjabi
- Time zone: UTC+5:30 (IST)

Akalgarh is a village located in Ludhiana district of Punjab in India.
