= Aitiana =

Coordinates: 30°45′N 75°36′E

Aitiana is a village of more than 5,000 people, situated approximately 30 km from the city of Ludhiana, Punjab, India. Nearby towns are Raikot, Sudhar, Jagraon and Mullanpur. There is access to the village by public transport, mainly buses or taxis. The closest railway Station is at Chawnkimaan (11 km).

Aitiana has three main educational institutions: a Government Primary School, Government High School and a private secondary school. Many students from the village study at schools and colleges in nearby towns and cities.
