= Ab Dilli Dur Nahin =

Ab Dilli Dur Nahin (lit. 'now Delhi is not faraway', a play on the phrase "Dilli Abhi Door Hai") may refer to:

- Ab Dilli Dur Nahin (1957 film), an Indian Hindi-language film
- Ab Dilli Dur Nahin (2023 film), an Indian Hindi-language drama film
