= Ranjit Bawa =

Indian singer and actor

- Born: Ranjit Singh Bajwa; 14 March 1989 (age 37); Gurdaspur, Punjab, India
- Citizenship: India
- Education: Guru Nanak Dev University
- Occupations: Singer; actor
- Years active: 2013-present
- Awards: Best Debut Actor in Punjabi Cinema
- Musical career
- Genres: Bhangra; Folk; romantic; Pop; Sikh
- Labels: T-Series; Speed Records; Jass Records; Moviebox Records; Rhythm Boyz

Ranjit Singh Bajwa (born 14 March 1989) is an Indian singer and actor mainly known as Ranjit Bawa and is associated with Punjabi language music and films. He rose to fame from his single "Jatt Di Akal" (2013) which received "PTC Best Folk oriented Song Award" in 2013, and his debut album, Mitti Da Bawa (2015), which was awarded the "Best World Album" award in the 2015 Brit Asia TV Music Awards. His numerous songs including "Yaari Chandigarh Waliye" and "Impress" peaked on UK Asian Music Chart and UK Punjabi Music Charts. He made his film debut in playing the title role in Toofan Singh, a semi-biographical film about the 1980s Punjabi activist Jugraj Singh Toofan.

== Education ==
Born in Gurdaspur in Punjab on 14 March 1989, Bawa did his graduation from Guru Nanak College, Batala and post-graduation at Khalsa College, Amritsar. Bawa did his Masters in Music from Guru Nanak Dev University.

== Acting career ==
Bawa began his acting career in 2017 with the biographical action film Toofan Singh, where he played the role of Jugraj Singh Toofan.

In 2018, he appeared in the period comedy Bhalwan Singh and the ensemble comedy sequel Mr & Mrs 420 Returns. In 2019, he starred in the friendship-based drama High End Yaariyaan and lead the romantic comedy Tara Mira, produced by singer Guru Randhawa. His later works include LehmberGinni (2023), which focused on social themes alongside romance.

== Discography ==
=== Studio albums ===
Title	Album details	Ref
Mitti Da Bawa	Released: 2015; Label: T-Series; Formats: CD, digital download, streaming	
Ik Tare Wala	Released: 2018; Label: T-Series; Formats: CD, digital download, streaming	
LOUD	Released: 2021; Label: Speed Records; Formats: digital download, streaming	
Ve Geetan Waleya	Released: 2022; Label: Ranjit Bawa Music; Formats: digital download, streaming	
God's Land	Released: 2022; Label: Bless Studios; Formats: digital download, streaming	
Mitti Da Bawa 2	Released: 2023; Label: Ranjit Bawa Music; Formats: digital download, streaming	
Proud Jawani	Released: 20 June 2025; Label: Ranjit Bawa Music; Formats : digital download, Streaming	
The Folk Era	Released: 5 August 2026; Label: Ranjit Bawa Music; Formats: digital download, Streaming	

=== Selected singles ===
Year	Track	Music	Lyrics	Notes	Ref
2013	"Jatt Di Akal"	Pavneet Birgi	Jaggi Sanghera	Debut Single	
2014	"Tankha"	Jassi X	Kabal Saroopwali		
2015	"Jean"	Nick Dhammu	Lovely Noor	From Mitti Da Bawa	
2016	"Ja Ve Mundiya"	Desi Crew	Narinder Batth		
2017	"Sher Marna"	Jay K	Rav Hanjra		
2018	"Weekend"	Enzo	Rav Hanjra		
2019	"Adhiya"	Street Boy	Vinder Nathumajra		
2020	"Impress"	Desi Crew	Bunty Bains		
2021	"Kinne Aye Kinne Gye"	Sukh Brar	Lovely Noor	Social-political theme	
2022	"Punjab Bolda"	Sukh Brar	Lovely Noor		
2023	"All Eyez on Me"	Mxrci	Rav Hanjra		

=== Film soundtracks ===
Song	Film	Year
"Narrow Salwar"	Oh My Pyo Ji	2014
"Des"	Love Punjab	2016
"Jatt Mele Aa Gaya"	Vaisakhi List	2016
"Kaal"	Great Sardar	2017
"Manak Di Kali", "Rani"	Bhalwan Singh	2017
"Mukabla"	Bailaras	2017
"Sarvaan Putt"	Sarvann	2017
"Tufan Rokne"	Toofan Singh	2017
"Sun Sohniye"	Afsar	2018
"Chan Wargi"	Mr & Mrs 420 Returns	2018

== Filmography ==
Film	Year	Role	Notes
Sarvann	2018	Amrik	
Toofan Singh	2018	Toofan Singh	
Vekh Baraatan Challiyan	2018	Shindi	
Khido Khundi	2018	Fateh	
Mr and Mrs 420 Returns	2018	Laadi	
Khaao Piyo Aish Karo	2022		
LehmberGinni	2023	Lehmber	
