= Khaao Piyo Aish Karo =

2024 Indian Hindi-language film

- Directed by: Ksshitij Chaudhary
- Screenplay by: Ksshitij Chaudhary
- Produced by: Harsimran Singh
- Starring: Tarsem Jassar; Ranjit Bawa; Jasmin Bajwa
- Cinematography: Sapan Narula
- Edited by: Bharat S Raawat
- Music by: Kulwinder Singh
- Production company: Brotherhood Productions
- Release date: 1 July 2022
- Country: India
- Language: Punjabi

Khaao Piyo Aish Karo (transl. Eat drink and have fun) is a 2022 Indian Punjabi-language Comedy Film written and directed by Ksshitij Chaudhary. The film stars Tarsem Jassar, Ranjit Bawa and Jasmin Bajwa in lead roles.

== Synopsis ==
Cousins Jeeta and Mitha get into occasional conflicts due to their contrasting values and lifestyles. However, situations turn erratic when one of them commits a blunder.

== Cast ==
- Tarsem Jassar
- Ranjit Bawa
- Jasmin Bajwa
- Aditi Sharma
- Prabh Grewal
- Sandeep Malhi
- Gurbaaz Singh
- Ashok Pathak

== Soundtrack ==
Khaao Piyo Aish Karo

Soundtrack album by Kulwinder Singh
- Released: 22 July 2022
- Recorded: 2021–2022
- Genre: Feature film soundtrack
- Language: Punjabi
External audio
- Video on YouTube

The music of the film is composed by Kulwinder Singh and sung by Ranjit Bawa, Tarsem Jassar and others.

No.	Title	Lyrics	Music	Singer(s)	Length
1.	"Wagdi Raavi"	Mahabir Sandhu	Gurmoh	Ranjit Bawa	3:58
2.	"Phulkari"	Preet Judge	Gold E Gill	Ranjit Bawa & Jassi Katyal	2:33
3.	"Maahi Ve"	MixSingh	Tarsem Jassar	Tarsem Jassar & MixSingh	1:31
4.	"Jutti"	Sukh Sandhu	Beat Inspector	Ranjit Bawa	1:57
5.	"Sareeka"	Balli Baljit	Gurmoh	Ranjit Bawa, Tarsem Jassar & Balli Baljit	3:30
Total length:					14:29
