= Soorma =

2018 Indian film by Shaad Ali

- Theatrical release poster
- Directed by: Shaad Ali
- Written by: Suyash Trivedi; Shaad Ali; Siva Ananth
- Produced by: Deepak Singh; Chitrangda Singh
- Starring: Diljit Dosanjh; Taapsee Pannu; Angad Bedi
- Cinematography: Chirantan Das
- Edited by: Farooq Hundekar
- Music by: Shankar–Ehsaan–Loy
- Production companies: Sony Pictures Networks India Private Limited; C.S. Films
- Distributed by: SPE Films India
- Release date: 13 July 2018; (worldwide)
- Running time: 131 minutes
- Country: India
- Language: Hindi
- Budget: ₹31 crore
- Box office: ₹48 crore

Soorma (transl. Warrior; Hindi pronunciation: [suːɾma]) is a 2018 Indian Hindi-language biographical sports drama film based on the life of hockey player Sandeep Singh. Directed by Shaad Ali and produced by Sony Pictures Networks India and C. S. Films, the film stars Diljit Dosanjh, Angad Bedi and Taapsee Pannu in lead roles. Chitrangada Singh made her debut as a producer with this film. It was released theatrically on 13 July 2018.

Received mixed to positive reviews from critics, Soorma grossing ₹470 million (US$5.0 million) worldwide on a budget of ₹310 million (US$3.3 million).

== Plot ==
In 1994, at Shahbad Hockey Centre, a young Sandeep Singh and his older brother, Bikram Singh are seen undergoing a punishment by their coach Kartar Singh, who is a strict disciplinarian trainer. As a result of that, Sandeep decides to quit hockey. As a grown young man, he meets Harpreet Kaur, a budding female hockey player who practices the sport at the same centre. They both develop an interest in each other. With intent of catching up with Harpreet, Sandeep joins the Hockey Centre again. He starts to become good at his game. Meanwhile, Sandeep and Harpreet develop a romantic relationship. The coach, who is Harpreet's uncle, finds out about their relationship and physically assaults Sandeep. Bikram, who had been constantly working for selection to the Indian hockey team, fails to make it to India camp. Bikram finds out that his brother is exceptionally good at drag flick and helps him get to the Indian team, where he practices under the coach Harry. He goes on to become the highest scorer at Six Nation Series in Poland in 2006. After his success, the media terms him “Flicker Singh”. He also gets a job offer. However, Harpeet's uncle still heatedly agrees to accept him as a suitable husband for his niece.

In the same year, while leaving for Hockey World Cup, on a train, he is accidentally shot in his lower back and is paralyzed in the lower half of his body. The news of his never being able to play hockey again starts circulating in the media. Sandeep now uses a wheelchair and his family, especially Bikram, takes care of his nursing needs. In 2007, supported by Indian Hockey Federation, Sandeep is moved to the Netherlands, where, due to intensive therapy for a year, he recovers from his injury and starts playing again. He joins the 2008 India Hockey Camp in New Delhi. He is seen at the 2009 Commonwealth Championship in London, where Harpreet comes by to watch the game. Sandeep, who earlier used to get distracted by Harpreet's presence, manages to score the winning goal, indicating that he is now actually playing for India and not for seeking Harpreet's love. In the closing scene, archive footage of the actual player is seen where Sandeep Singh gets the 2010 Arjuna Award from the President of India.

== Cast ==
- Diljit Dosanjh as Sandeep "Sunny" Singh a.k.a. Flicker Singh
  - Agam Singh as Young Sandeep Singh
- Tapsee Pannu as Harpreet Kaur
- Angad Bedi as Bikramjeet Singh
  - Amritpal Singh as Young Bikramjeet Singh
- Amit Gaur as Ajit, Harpreet's Brother
- Satish Kaushik as Gurcharan Singh, Sandeep's father
- Seema Kaushal as Daljeet Kaur, Sandeep's mother
- Jasmin Bajwa as Minaxi Singh
- Danish Husain as Coach Kartar Singh
- Kulbhushan Kharbanda as Chairman of Indian Hockey Federation
- Vijay Raaz as Harry, Sandeep's coach
- Jimmy Moses as Joseph Lobo, Sandeep's assistant coach
- Bikramjeet Singh (Sandeep Singh's real brother) as Tanveer, Pakistani rival of Sandeep
- Frazer Gerrard as an angry, Polish hockey player
- Mahabir Bhullar as Sandeep's Taaya

== Production ==
=== Development ===
In November 2014, Chitrangada Singh purchased the rights to make a biopic on the life of former Indian hockey captain Sandeep Singh. In July 2017, it was reported that Chitrangda Singh would be collaborating with Sony Pictures Networks to produce the film in which Diljit Dosanjh would be playing the lead role. For the role of Sandeep Singh, the first preference of the producers was Ranveer Singh but the actor refused to do the film on being offered the role in the year 2016 citing lack of dates. Initially, for the role of Harpreet, the makers of the film had finalized Ileana D'Cruz but the actress opted out of the project as the filming dates were clashing with another film of hers that she was doing with Rajkumar Gupta. In September 2017, it was reported that Taapsee Pannu had been signed to play the romantic lead opposite Diljit Dosanjh in the film.

=== Filming ===
The principal photography of the film began in Shahabad in November 2017. The next schedule of the filming process took place in Chandigarh in December 2017. For the final schedule of filming, which involved shooting the hockey matches, the production unit moved to Belgrade in Serbia where shooting continued for 10 days before coming to an end on 24 December 2017. The hockey sequences in the film were choreographed by Sandeep Singh and his brother Bikramjit Singh.

The official trailer of the film was released on 11 June 2018.

== Soundtrack ==
The music of the movie is composed by Shankar–Ehsaan–Loy with lyrics by Gulzar. Contestants of the Talent Hunt show Rising Star, Hemant Brijwasi and Akhtar Brothers were offered a song by Shankar Mahadevan and Diljit Dosanjh for the movie.

== Reception ==
=== Critical response ===
On the review aggregator website Rotten Tomatoes, 50% of 14 critics' reviews are positive, with an average rating of 5.3/10.

Soorma received mixed reviews from critics. Subhash K Jha of Business Standard says, "After extolling a gangster, Bollywood salutes a true hero" and gave it 4.5 stars out of 5. Ronak Kotecha of The Times of India rated the film 3.5/5 stars stating that It is a story told with its heart in the right place, and on that count it scores. Divya Pal of News18 gave the film a rating of 2 out of 5 saying that the film is well intentioned but lacks depth. Rohit Vats of Hindustan Times gave the film a rating of 2 out of 5 saying that the film lacks the firepower to create a strong impact even though it does have praise worthy performances given by Vijay Raaz, Angad Bedi and Satish Kaushik. Saibal Chatterjee of NDTV criticized the film saying that Soorma is "a hockey film sans genuine impetus" and gave it a rating of 2 out of 5. Shubhra Gupta of The Indian Express gave the film a rating of 2.5 out of 5 and praised Diljit Dosanjh for his portrayal of Sandeep Singh but felt that the film falls short of becoming a sports film that would leave a lasting impact. Taran Adarsh of Bollywood Hungama gave the film two and a half stars out of five and writes, "Soorma is laced with a promising plot but the weak execution hampers the impact".

=== Box office ===
Soorma opened with a weak collection at the box office, collecting ₹3.20 crores (net) on its first day in India, on its second day it jumped over 57.81% and collected over ₹5.05 crores and its 2 days total collection was ₹8.25 crore. On the 3rd day, it further increased and marked up ₹5.60 crores. On the 4th day, the film collected ₹2 crores and on the 5th day ₹1.94 crores for a total of ₹17.79 crores. On the 6th day, it collected ₹1.77 crores. At the end of the first week, it was up to ₹21.21 crores and on day 8 it collected ₹1.65 crores, on day 9 it decreased and collected only ₹85 lakhs but on its 10th day it increased and marked ₹1.60 crores and on the 11th day it collected well on the box office and marked up to ₹2.10 crores approximately. From the 12th-15th day it collected ₹2.45 crores.

== Sequel ==
Chitrangada Singh confirmed that she will produce the sequel to the film. The cast and full crew have not been revealed yet, and the film will soon go to floors. As its predecessor, the sequel will also be based on a real-life hero.
