= Yaar Jigree Kasooti Degree =

2018 Web series

- Official poster
- Genre: Comedy; Drama
- Created by: Rabby Tiwana
- Written by: Rabby Tiwana
- Directed by: Rabby Tiwana
- Starring: Pukhraj Bhalla; Jasmin Bajwa; Prateek Singh Rai; Karan Sandhawalia; Sukhdeep Sapra; Amrit Amby; Gursimran, Tannu Kaur; Karanvir Deol; Pawan Johal
- Theme music composer: Mista Baaz, Jass Toor
- Country of origin: India
- Original language: Punjabi
- No. of seasons: 2
- No. of episodes: 26

Production
- Producer: Rabby Tiwana
- Cinematography: Gagan Sarao
- Editors: Rabby Tiwana; Prince K. Makkar
- Running time: 25 - 63 minutes
- Production company: Troll Punjabi

Original release
- Network: YouTube
- Release: 15 September 2018 – 30 December 2020

Yaar Jigree Kasooti Degree is an Indian Punjabi-language comedy-drama web-series created by Rabby Tiwana. Co-produced by Troll Punjabi and Media International, the series is based on life of college students. The series marks as one of first Punjabi successful web-series. The first episode of the series was aired on 15 September 2018, with first season concluding on 31 December 2018 at have been viewed over thirty and fifteen million times respectively. Season 2 premiered on 30 September 2020 and concluded on 30 December 2020.

A feature-length film titled Yaar Jigree Kasooti Degree, serving as a sequel to the series, was theatrically released on 7 August 2026.

== Cast ==
=== Main ===
- Pukhraj Bhalla as Jaspreet "Jass" Singh Randhawa
- Karan Sandhawalia as Lakhvinder "Lucky" Singh
- Sukhdeep Sapra as Anmoldeep "Anmol" Singh Sidhu
- Amrit Amby as Gurshabd Singh Brar (Lali)
- Prateek Singh Rai as Ekamveer "Ekam" Singh Gill
- Karanvir Deol as Rupinder "Roop" Singh Oberoi
- Pawan Johal as Kirat
- Jasmin Bajwa as Daizy Garewal
- Parteek Vadhera as Bhushan Kumar

=== Recurring ===
- Nirbhai Dhaliwal as Balveer Sir
- Enaayat Jugnu Surjeet as "Faujji"
- Charanpreet Maan as Jessica
- Hashneen Chauhan as Simran
- Jagmeet Kaur as Sukhmani
- Tannu Kaur as Japneet Kaur
- Gurjeet Singh Channi as Yuvraj Garewal
- Gaurav Sharma as Guru
- Chamkour Billa as Teji
- Babar Bassi as Lakha
- Davy Garewal as Vijayraj Singh Chima
- Lakha Khorupanti as Navdeep Singh
- Deepak Kamboj as Gajendra Rathi (HYM President)
- Sukhi Patran as Ustaad
- Satnam Dhuri (Teji's Friend)
- Dilveer Dill (Teji's Friend)
- Deepak kamboj
- Raj Dhaliwal
- Khushi Arora
- Debobrato Mukherjee as Harman

=== Special appearance ===
- Sharry Mann as Himself
- N Gritz as Himself
- Alaap Sikandar as Himself

== Episodes ==
=== Season 1 (2018) ===
No.	Title	Directed by	Written by	Original release date
1	"New Admission "	Rabby Tiwana	Rabby Tiwana	15 September 2018
2	"Back To Basics"	Rabby Tiwana	Rabby Tiwana	22 September 2018
3	"The Chase"	Rabby Tiwana	Rabby Tiwana	29 September 2018
4	"Interconnection"	Rabby Tiwana	Rabby Tiwana	6 October 2018
5	"PT Meeting"	Rabby Tiwana	Rabby Tiwana	13 October 2018
6	"Youth Festival"	Rabby Tiwana	Rabby Tiwana	27 October 2018
7	"Revelations"	Rabby Tiwana	Rabby Tiwana	3 November 2018
8	"Disintegration"	Rabby Tiwana	Rabby Tiwana	10 November 2018
9	"Repentance"	Rabby Tiwana	Rabby Tiwana	19 November 2018
10	"Shaapa"	Rabby Tiwana	Rabby Tiwana	26 November 2018
11	"Retaliation"	Rabby Tiwana	Rabby Tiwana	3 December 2018
12	"Attainment"	Rabby Tiwana	Rabby Tiwana	11 December 2018
13	"Apprehension"	Rabby Tiwana	Rabby Tiwana	31 December 2018

=== Season 2 (2020) ===
No.	Title	Directed by	Written by	Original release date
1	"Hostel"	Rabby Tiwana	Rabby Tiwana	30 September 2020
2	"Rusticate"	Rabby Tiwana	Rabby Tiwana	3 October 2020
3	"Remand"	Rabby Tiwana	Rabby Tiwana	10 October 2020
4	"Admin Block"	Rabby Tiwana	Rabby Tiwana	17 October 2020
5	"Protest"	Rabby Tiwana	Rabby Tiwana	24 October 2020
6	"RTI"	Rabby Tiwana	Rabby Tiwana	31 October 2020
7	"New Room"	Rabby Tiwana	Rabby Tiwana	7 November 2020
8	"Online Chhat"	Rabby Tiwana	Rabby Tiwana	14 November 2020
9	"Guftgoo"	Rabby Tiwana	Rabby Tiwana	21 November 2020
10	"Sach"	Rabby Tiwana	Rabby Tiwana	28 November 2020
11	"Allegation"	Rabby Tiwana	Rabby Tiwana	5 December 2020
12	"Cracked"	Rabby Tiwana	Rabby Tiwana	19 December 2020
13	"Reunion"	Rabby Tiwana	Rabby Tiwana	30 December 2020

== Production ==
Rabby Tiwana whilst studying B.Tech in TV production and media technology at Centre For Advanced Media Studies, Punjabi University developed the series. Most of the cast in the web-series are also the students of Punjabi University including Pukhraj Bhalla and Karan Sandhawalia. The principal photography of the series began in April 2017.

Due to his previous successful documentary he went to produce the web-series by himself only under his production company Troll Punjabi. Tiwana said, "After my documentary won various awards, my parents got convinced that I was on the right track, so they helped me with the project." "It was meant to be for television, but no channel took it up; some found the quality poor, some had other issues, so, I finally gave the satellite rights to Troll Punjabi (a web page started by him) and kept the web rights with myself," adds the director. Jung Bahadur Singh, teacher, said, "This is an all-student production; they haven’t hired a single professional."

== Soundtrack ==
Soundtrack of the web-series is composed by Mista Baaz, Sarang Sikander, Preet Hundal, Sharan Shergill, Kru172, Dreamboy and JT Bhatti which features vocals from Sharry Mann, Sardool Sikander, Sarang Sikander, Preet Hundal, Daman Kaushal, Pukhraj Bhalla, Karan Sandhawalia, Rabia Sagoo and Harinder Samra. All the tracks were released by Troll Punjabi themselves only. The theme and promotional track of series sung by Mann went viral, and has been viewed over 70 million times on YouTube.

=== Track list ===
Season 1

No.	Title	Lyrics	Music	Singers	Length
1.	"Yaar Jigree Kasooti Degree"	Karan Sandhawalia	Mista Baaz	Sharry Mann	5:51
2.	"Yaar Gawaune"	Chenny Bains	Sarang Sikander	Sarang Sikander	5:42
3.	"Fracture"	Karan Sandhawalia	Sharan Shergill	Daman Kaushal	3:19
4.	"Shy"	Harinder Samra	Dreamboy	Harinder Samra	3:41
5.	"Nafaa"	Karan Sandhawalia	Kru172	Karan Sandhawalia	4:18
6.	"Zaalma"	JT Bhatti	JT Bhatti	Pukhraj Bhalla	4:15
7.	"Yaari"	Jagga	Gur Sidhu	Gur Sidhu	6:51
Total length:					mm:ss

Season 2

No.	Title	Lyrics	Music	Singers	Length
1.	"Mere Yaar"	N-Gritz	JT Beats	N-Gritz, Sarang Sikander	4:55
2.	"Jutti Kadwi"	Noor Tung	IRIS Music	Noor Tung	2:54
3.	"Hostel Boliyan"	Bhindi Tolawal	JT Beats	Pukhraj Bhalla, Jasmeen Aktar	3:59
4.	"Suppli"	Kay Kap	Dr. Brat	Kay Kap	4:32
5.	"Sukoon"	Karan Sandhawalia	JT Beats	Karan Sandhawalia	5:03
6.	"Dil Haare"	Karan Sandhawalia	JT Beats	Pukhraj Bhalla	3:58
Total length:					mm:ss

== Release ==
=== Season 1 ===
The first look of the series was released on 23 March 2018 by Troll Punjabi on YouTube and the teaser was released on 5 August 2018. The theme song of the series sung by Sharry Mann and penned by Karan Sandhawalia was released on 22 August 2018 often the song was leaked on internet before. Official trailer was released on 1 September 2018 and the first episode was released on 15 September 2018 followed by other episodes released every Saturday while few were postponed due to various reasons. The series addresses the struggle of college students in India, including rustication, drugs, marks and more. The series is also the first Punjabi web-series followed by Gangland in Motherland.

=== Season 2 ===
The trailer of Season 2 was released on 27 September 2020 and first Episode released on 30 September 2020 in Troll Punjabi YouTube Channel, followed by other episodes of Season 2 will be release every Saturday. Their can be a few exceptions in the release date as the farmer protest and some social, and financial issues from the crew.

=== Future ===
In October 2025, a film adaptation titled Yaar Jigree Kasooti Degree – The Film was officially announced by Omjee’s Cine World in association with Troll Punjabi at a launch event held at Chandigarh Group of Colleges (CGC), Landran. The event was attended by principal cast members including Pukhraj Bhalla, Amrit Amby, Pawan Johal, and Hashneen Chauhan, along with writer-director Rabby Tiwana and producer Munish Sahni, where an announcement teaser confirmed the film’s theatrical release on 7 August

=== Reception ===
The web-series received positive responses from its audience but was criticized a lot for its release delays.

Yaar Jigree Kasooti Degree : Worldwide viewers per episode (millions)

Season	Episode number													Average
Season	1	2	3	4	5	6	7	8	9	10	11	12	13	Average
1	51.36	28.63	22.68	22.61	20.11	22.91	18.86	20.91	20.61	20.79	19.16	21.00	24.61	24.17
2	19.43	16.47	16.60	13.87	13.57	13.46	14.18	14.80	13.98	13.68	14.41	14.31	17.24	15.08

Source: Viewership and averages are as of August 2025
