= Tughlaqabad Fort =

Fort in Delhi, India

Coordinates: 28°30′43″N 77°15′39″E

- Part of Delhi
- Delhi, India
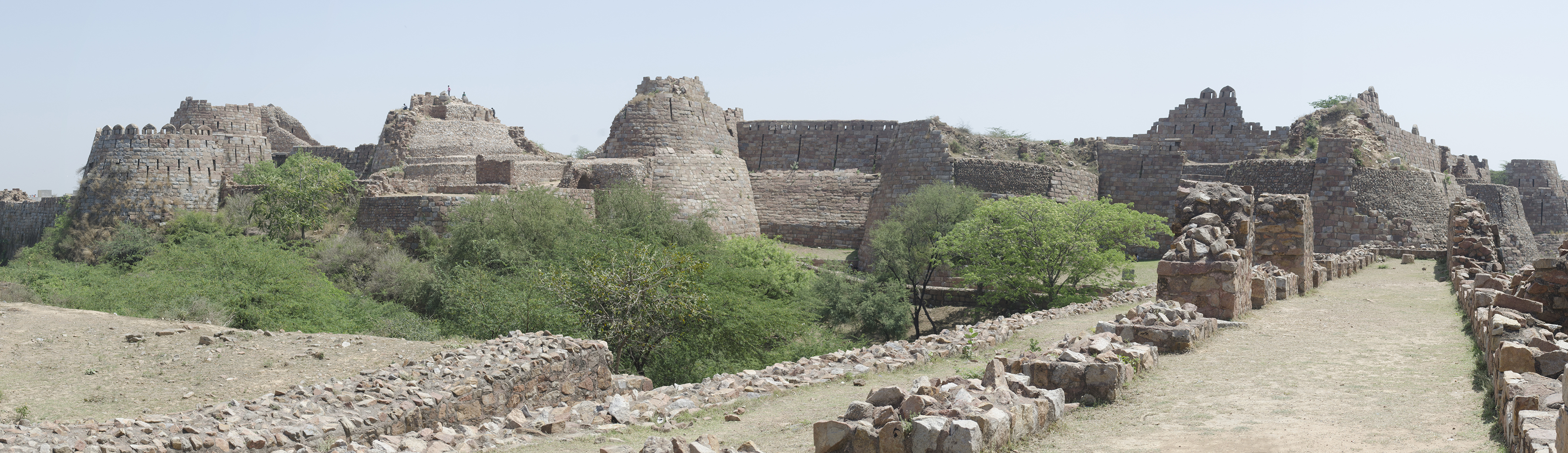
- Panoramic view of the massive bastions of Tughluqabad Fort

Site information
- Type: Ruined Fort
- Condition: Ruins

Site history
- Built: 1321; 705 years ago
- Built by: Ghiyath al-Din Tughluq
- Materials: Granite Stones and lime mortar

Tughluqabad Fort is a ruined fort in Delhi, India. Ghiyath al-Din Tughluq, the founder of the Tughlaq dynasty and ruler of the Delhi Sultanate, constructed it in 1321 when he established the third historic city of Delhi. However, it was later abandoned in 1327.

The fort lends its name to the nearby Tughluqabad residential-commercial area as well as the Tughluqabad Institutional Area. Ghiyasuddin Tughluq also built the Qutub-Badarpur Road, which connected the new city to the Grand Trunk Road. The road is now known as Mehrauli-Badarpur Road.

Its environs are an important biodiversity area within the Northern Aravalli leopard wildlife corridor stretching from Sariska Tiger Reserve to Delhi. Historical places around the sanctuary are Badkhal Lake, 6 km (3.7 mi) northeast, the tenth century ancient Surajkund reservoir and Anangpur Dam, Damdama Lake, Tughlaqabad Fort and Adilabad ruins (both in Delhi). It is contiguous to the seasonal waterfalls in Pali-Dhuaj-Kot villages of Faridabad, the sacred Mangar Bani and the Asola Bhatti Wildlife Sanctuary. There are several dozen lakes formed in the abandoned open pit mines in the forested hilly area of Delhi Ridge.

== History ==
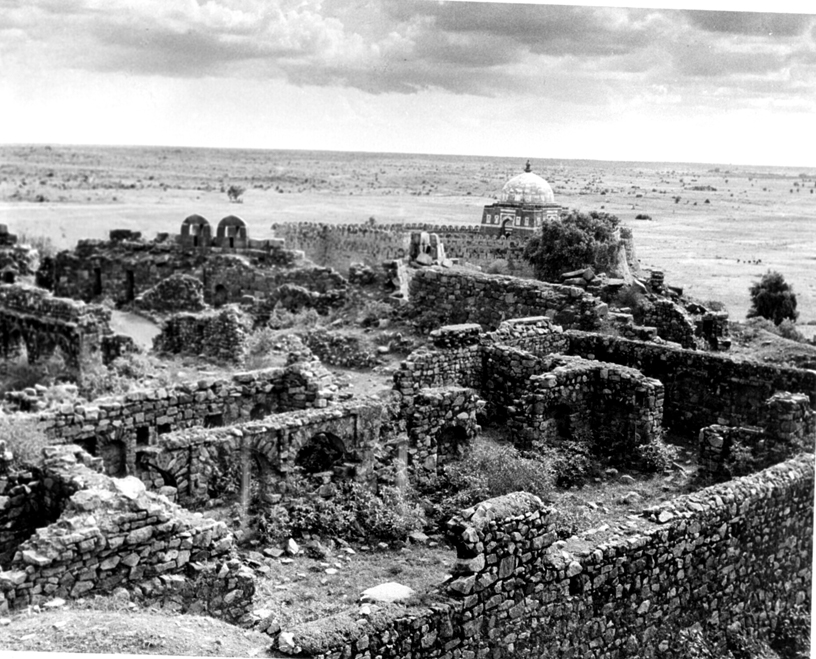
Ruins of Tughlaqabad Fort with Ghiyas-ud-din's tomb in the background, 1949

Ghazi Malik was a feudatory of the Khalji rulers of Delhi, India. The Khaliji dynasty is a Turk-Afghan dynasty that ruled India. Once, while on a walk with his Khalji master, Ghazi Malik suggested that the king build a fort on a hillock in the southern portion of Delhi. The king jokingly told Ghazi Malik to build the fort himself when he would become king.

In 1321, Ghazi Malik drove away the Khaljis and assumed the title of Ghiyath al-Din Tughluq, commencing the Tughlaq dynasty. He promptly ordered the construction of his legendary city, envisioning it as a beautiful yet impregnable fortress that would ward off Mongol marauders. However, destiny would not be as he would have liked.

=== The Curse of Nizamuddin Auliya ===
During the construction of Tughlaqabad Fort in 1321, Ghiyath al-Din Tughluq encountered a conflict with the revered Sufi saint Hazrat Nizamuddin Auliya. While the ruler sought to mobilise all labourers for his fort's construction, many were also working on a stepwell (baoli) in nighttime for Nizamuddin at his residence. In an effort to compel the workers to abandon the baoli project, Tughlaq banned the sale of kerosene, aiming to prevent them from lighting lamps at night.

Angered by the ruler's actions, Nizamuddin Auliya pronounced a curse: "Ya rahe ujjar, ya base Gujjar," meaning "Either it remains a ruin or may the nomadic and peasant Gujjars live there."

During a military campaign in Bengal, Tughlaq learned that laborers at his newly constructed Fort were defying his orders by working on the (baoli). He vowed to punish the saint upon his return to Delhi. In response, Nizamuddin Auliya remarked, "Hunuz Dilli dur ast," meaning "Delhi is still far off," suggesting that the Sultan's plans would be thwarted.

As the curse began to take effect, Tughlaq and his younger son met a tragic fate on their journey back. A pavilion, erected to celebrate the Sultan's military success, collapsed, resulting in their deaths. This incident underscored the belief that Nizamuddin's curse had manifested, leading to the eventual abandonment of Tughlaqabad Fort shortly after its completion.

=== The death of the ruler ===
Another of the saint's curses was "Hunuz Dilli door ast" (Delhi is still far away). The Emperor was engrossed in a campaign in Bengal at this time. He was successful and was on his way to Delhi. However, his son, Muhammad bin Tughluq, met him at Kara in Uttar Pradesh. Allegedly at the prince's orders, a Shamiana (Tent) was made to fall on the Emperor, who was crushed to death (1324).

== Mausoleum of Ghiyath al-Din Tughluq ==
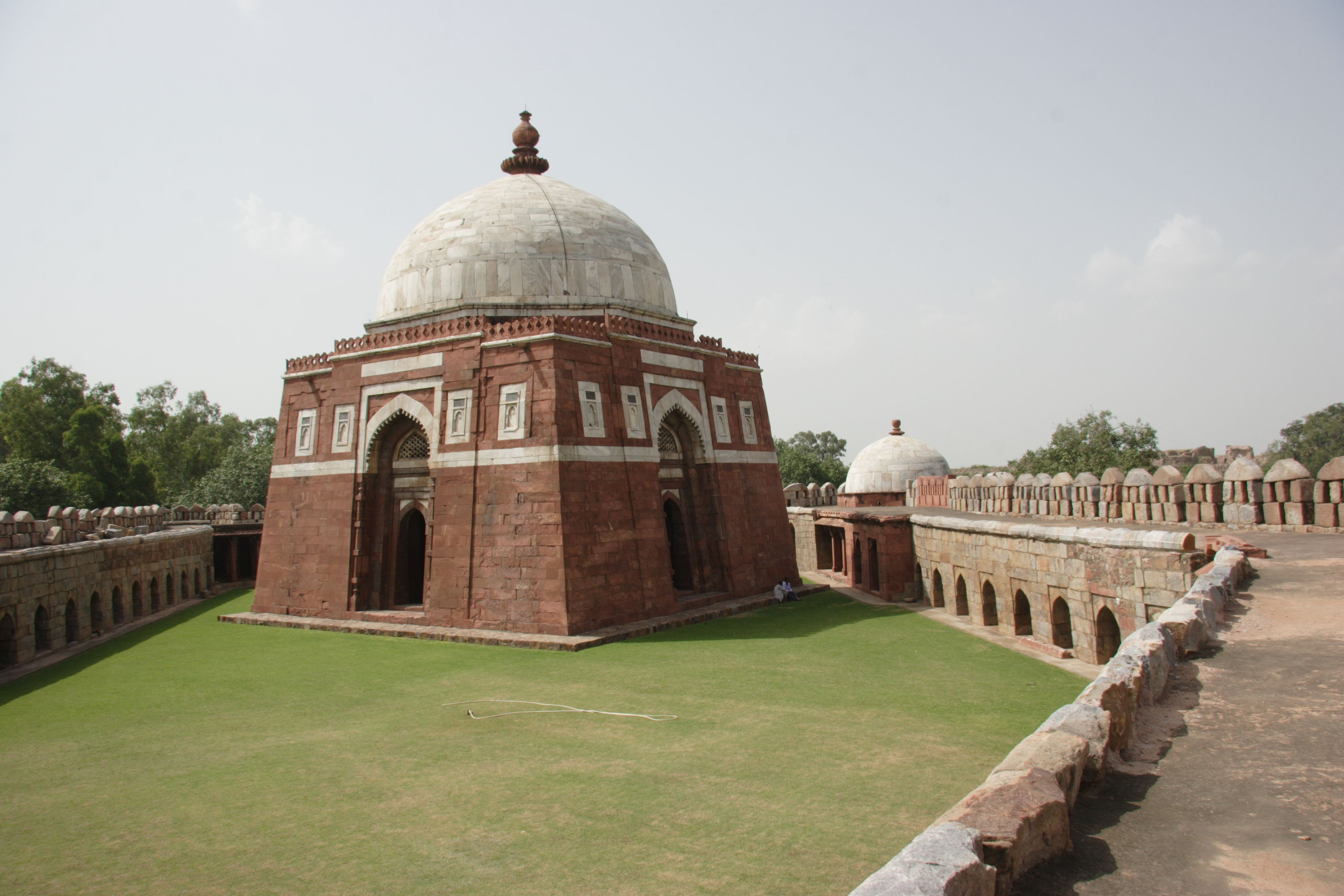
Mausoleum of Ghiyath al-Din Tughluq at Tughluqabad, also showing a side tomb.

The 'Mausoleum of Ghiyath al-Din Tughluq' is connected by a causeway to the southern outpost of the fortification. This elevated causeway 180 metres (600 ft) in length, supported by 27 arches, leads across a former artificial lake. However, sometime around the twentieth century, a portion of the causeway was pierced by the Mehrauli-Badarpur road. After passing an old Pipal tree, the complex of Ghiyas ud-din Tughluq's tomb is entered by a high gateway made up of red sandstone with a flight of steps.

The actual mausoleum is made up of a single-domed square tomb about 8 by 8 metres (26 ft × 26 ft) with sloping walls crowned by parapets. In contrast to the walls of the fortification made up of granite, the sides of the mausoleum are faced by smooth red sandstone and inlaid with inscribed panels and arch borders from marble. The edifice is topped by an elegant dome resting on an octagonal drum that is covered with white slabs of marble and slate.

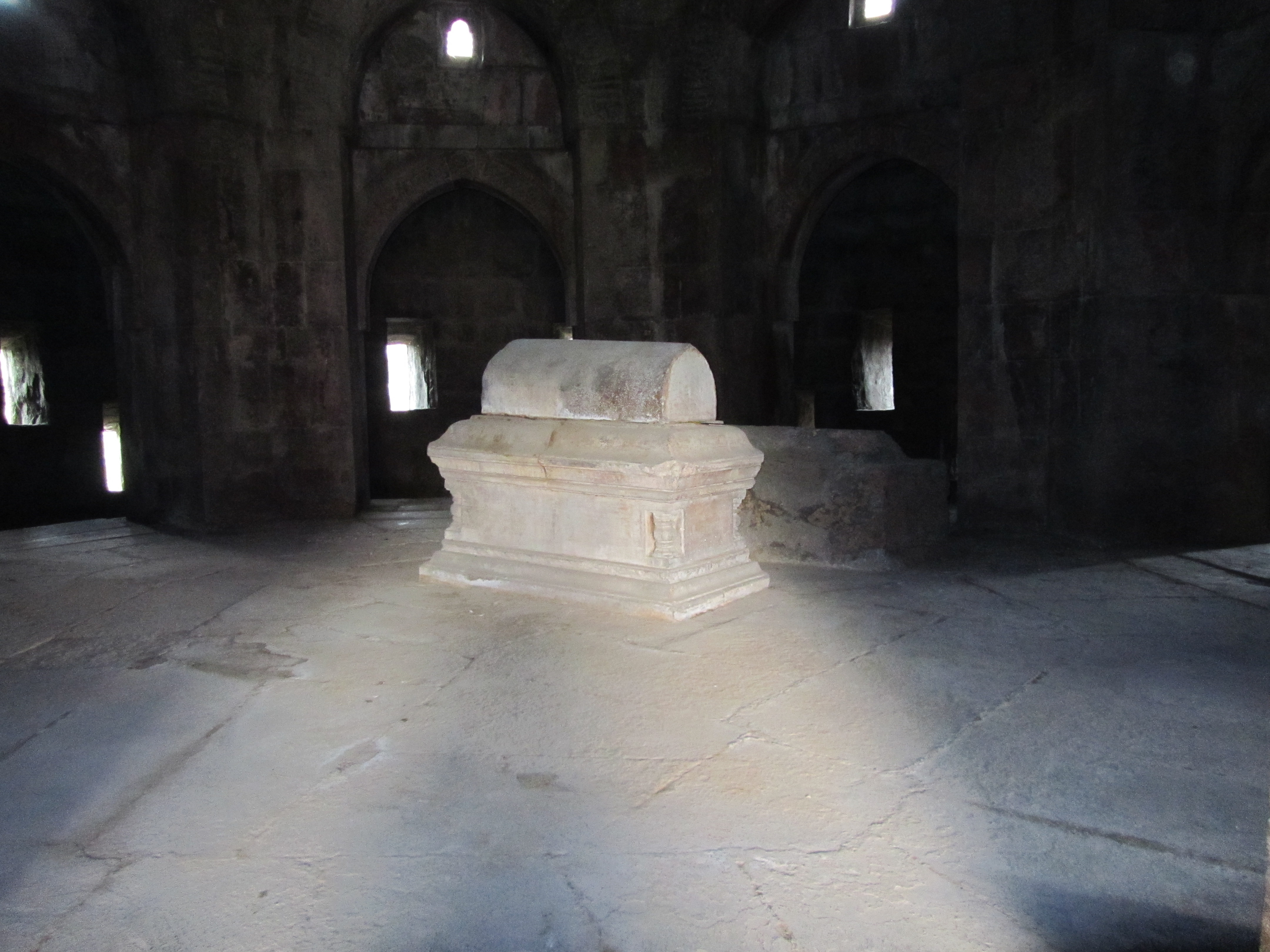
Graves inside the Mausoleum

Inside the mausoleum reside three graves: the central one belongs to Ghiyath al-Din Tughluq, whereas the other two are believed to be those of his wife and his son (and successor) Muhammad bin Tughluq. In the north-western bastion of the enclosure wall with its pillared corridors is another octagonal tomb in a similar style with a smaller marble dome and inscribed marble and sandstone slabs over its arched doors. According to an inscription over its southern entrance, this tomb houses the remains of Zafar Khan. His grave was at the site prior to the construction of the outpost and was consciously integrated into the design of the mausoleum by Ghiyath al-Din himself.

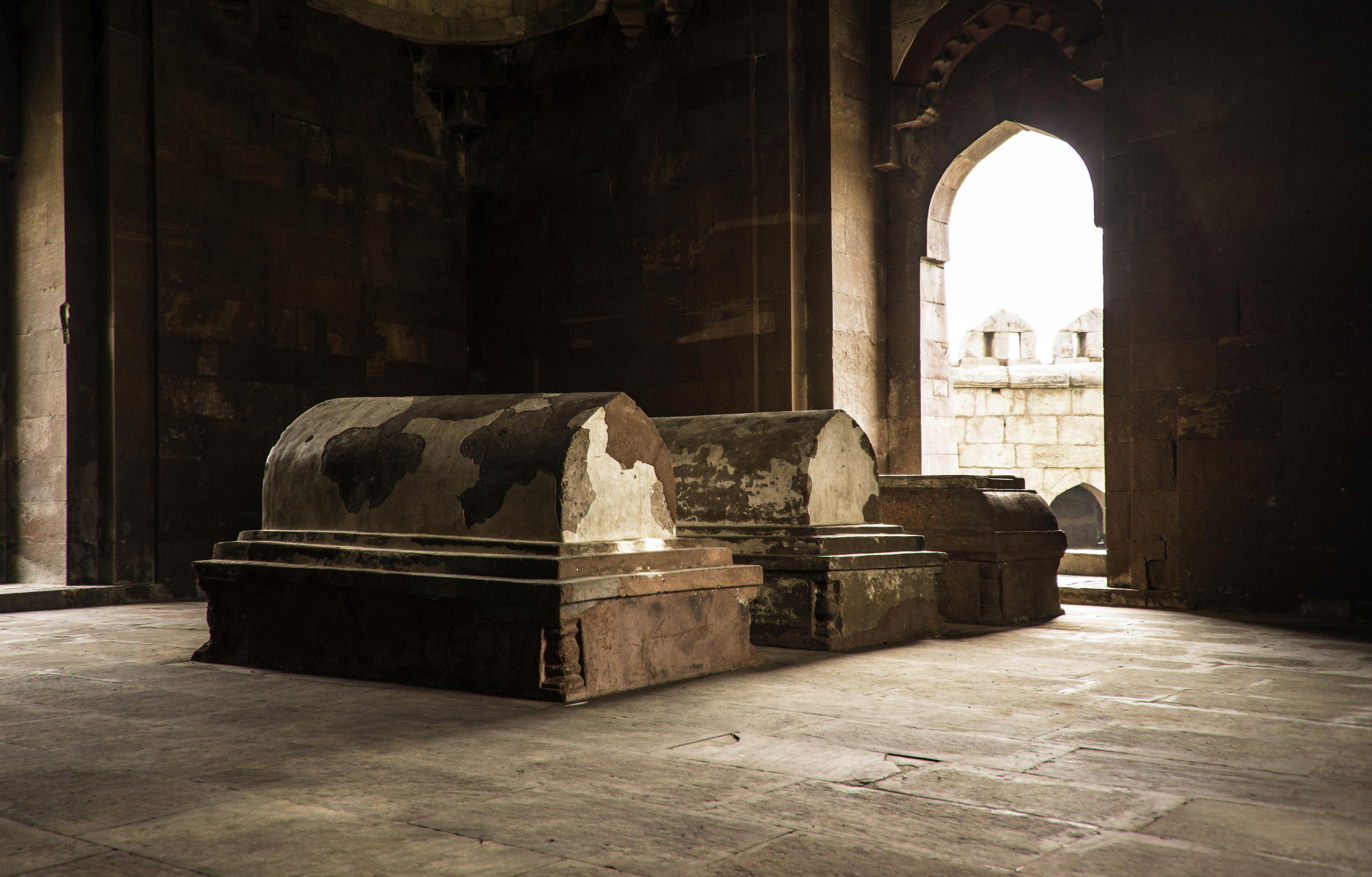
Ghiyas Ud Din's Grave inside the Mausoleum

== Architecture ==
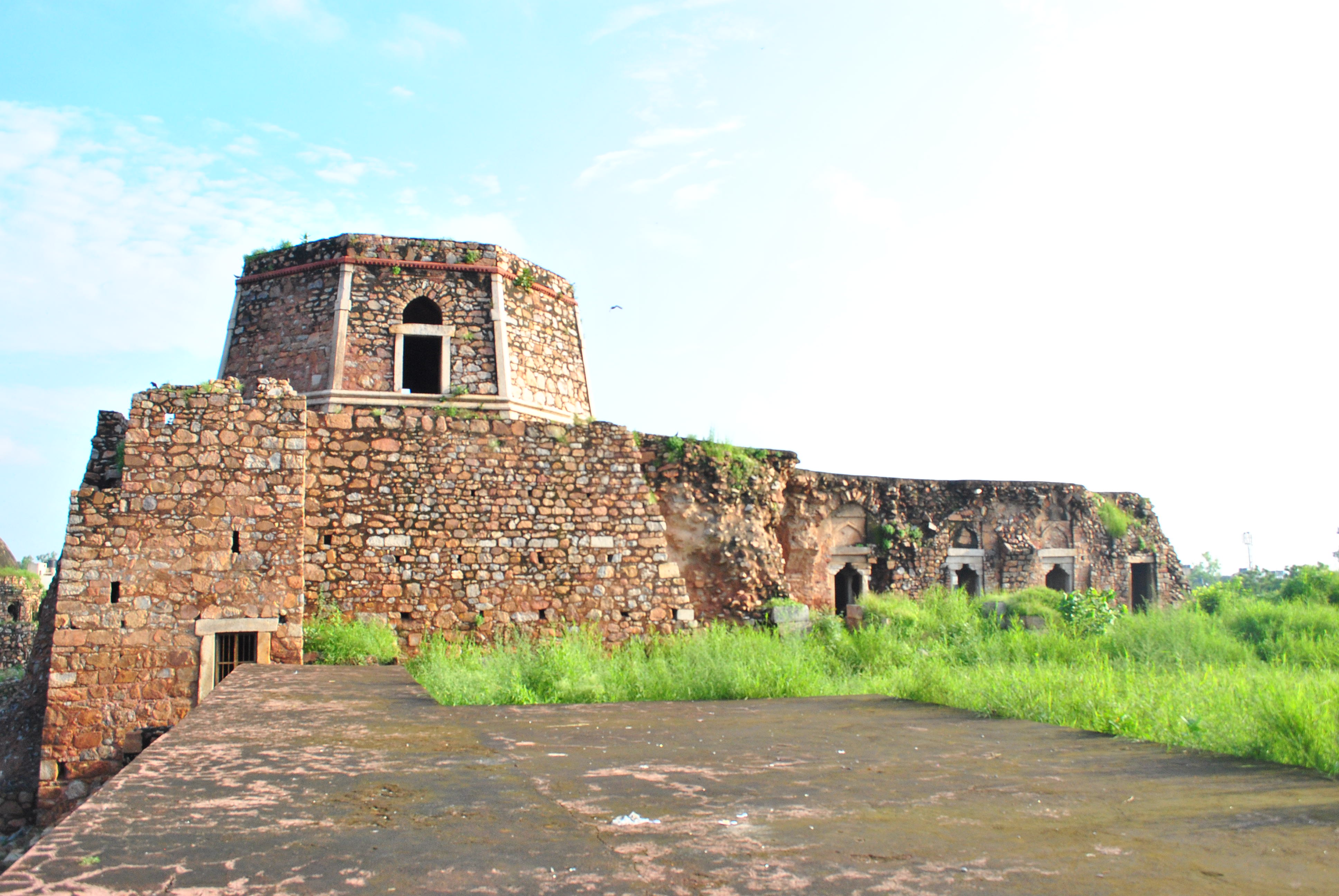
Ruins of the Bijai-Mandal

Tughluqabad still consists of remarkable, massive stone fortifications that surround the irregular ground plan of the city. The sloping rubble-filled city walls, a characteristic endemic to monuments of the Tughluq dynasty, are between 10 and 15 metres (33 and 49 ft) high, topped by battlemented parapets and strengthened by circular bastions of up to two stories height. The city is supposed to once have had as many as 52 gates, of which only 13 remain standing today. The fortified city contained seven rainwater tanks. The fort is a half hexagon in shape with a base of 2.4 km (1.5 mi), and a whole circuit of about 6.4 km (4 mi).

Tughluqabad is trifurcated into the following sections:

1. the wider city area with houses built along a rectangular grid between its gates
2. the citadel with a tower at its highest point known as Bijai-Mandal, and the remains of several halls and a long underground passage
3. the adjacent palace area containing the royal residences; a long underground passage below the tower still remains

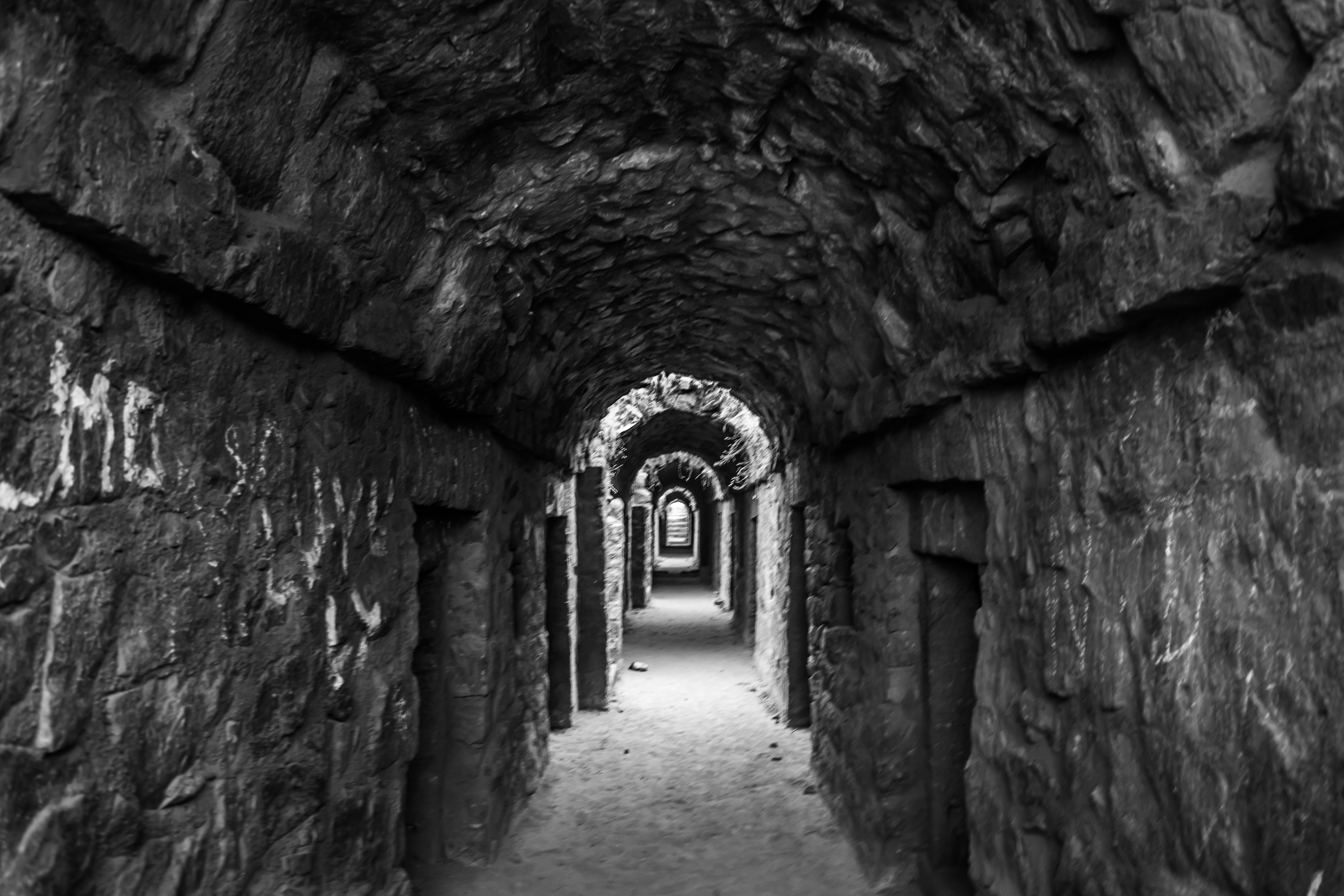
Underground passage of Tughlaqabad fort

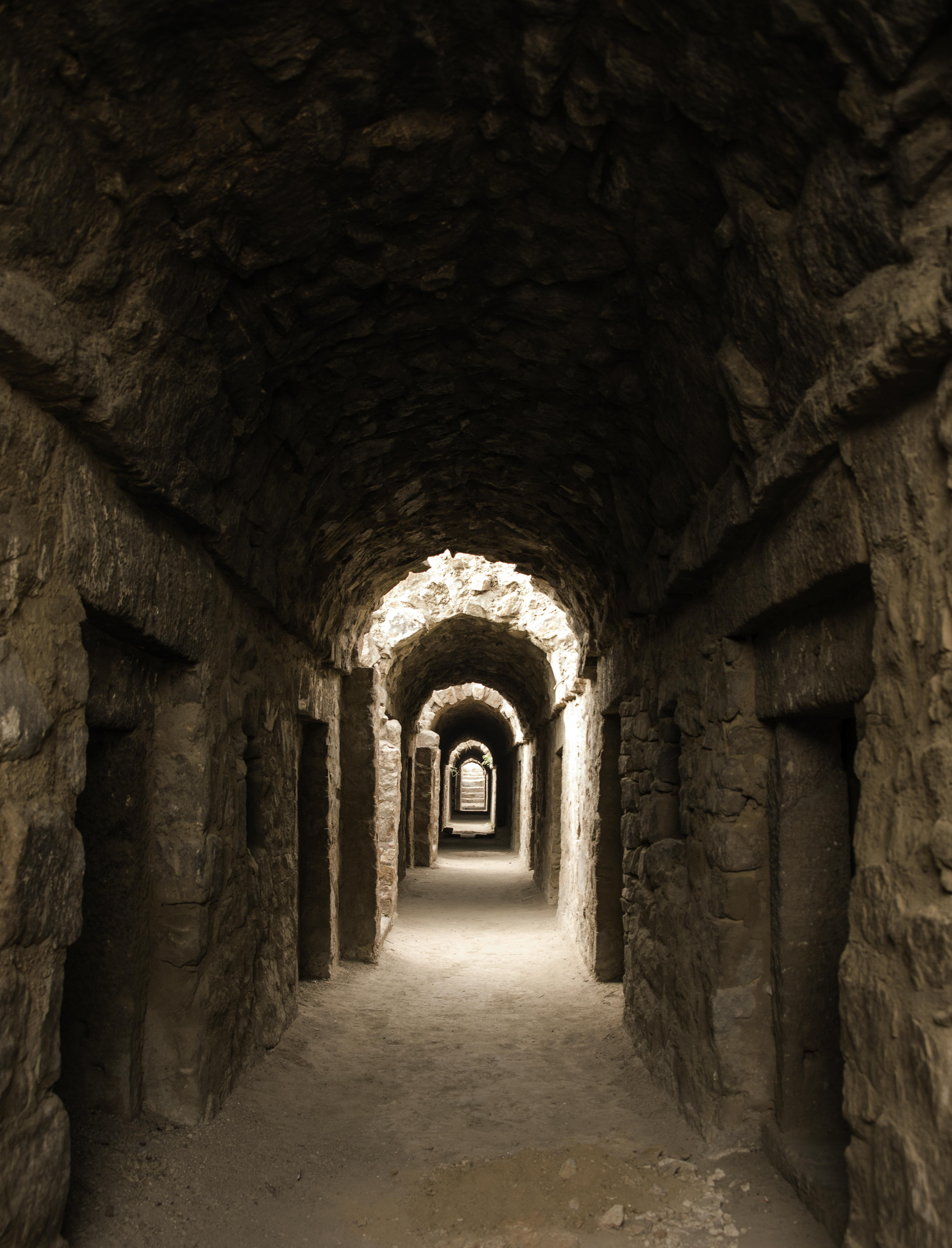
Meena Bazar in the basement

Today, the vast majority of the city is inaccessible owing to dense thorny vegetation and neglect. An ever increasing part of the former city area is occupied by a burgeoning modern illegal settlement, especially in the vicinity of its lakes.

South of Tughlaqabad was a vast artificial water reservoir within the fortified outpost of Ghiyath al-Din Tughluq's Tomb. This well-preserved mausoleum remains connected to the fort by an elevated causeway that still stands today.

Visible to the southeast are the remains of the Fortress of Adilabad, built years later by Ghiyath al-Din's successor, Muhammad bin Tughluq (1325–1351). It shares the main construction characteristics with the Tughlaqabad Fort.

== Gallery ==
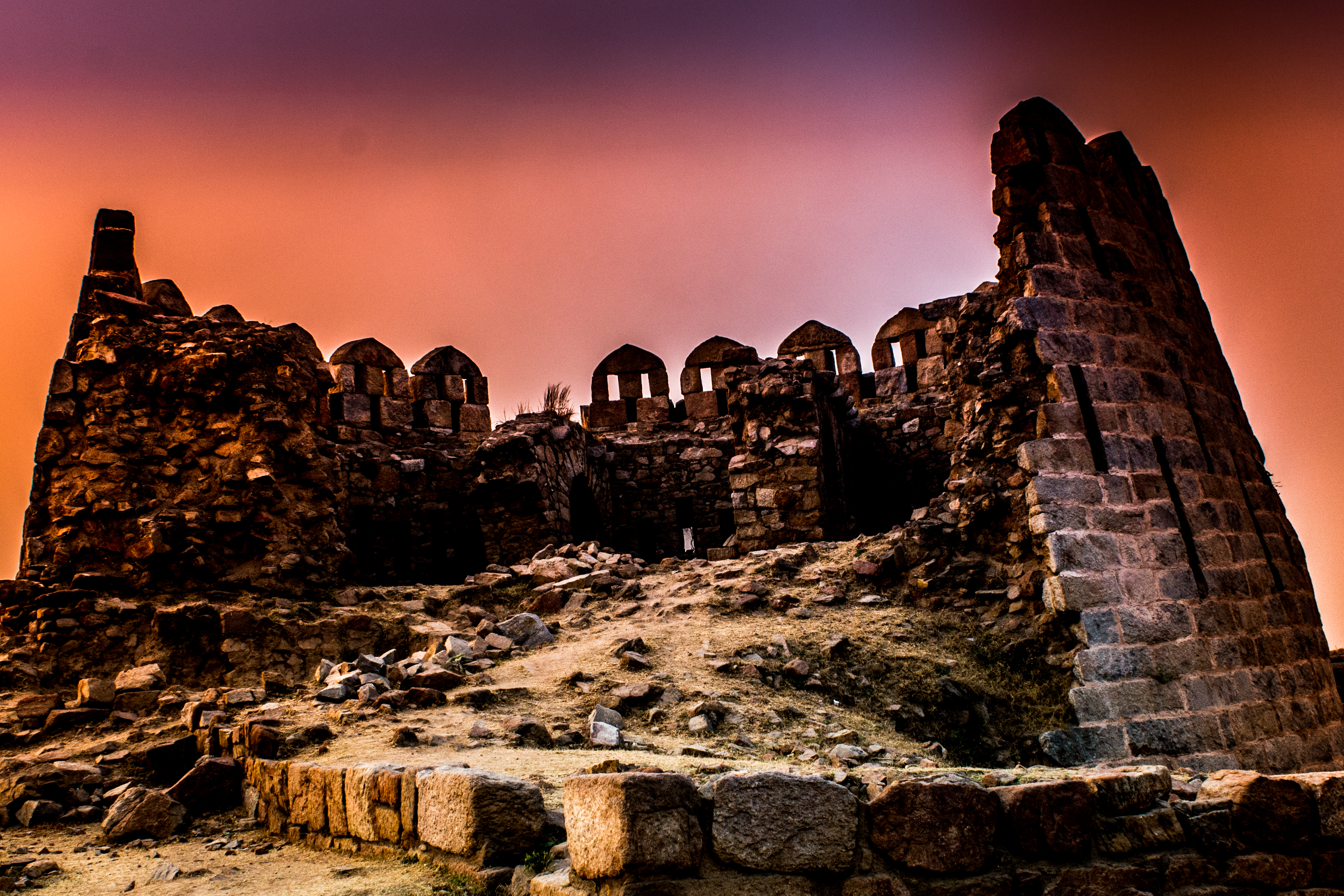
A view of ruined fort of Tughlaqabad during sunset

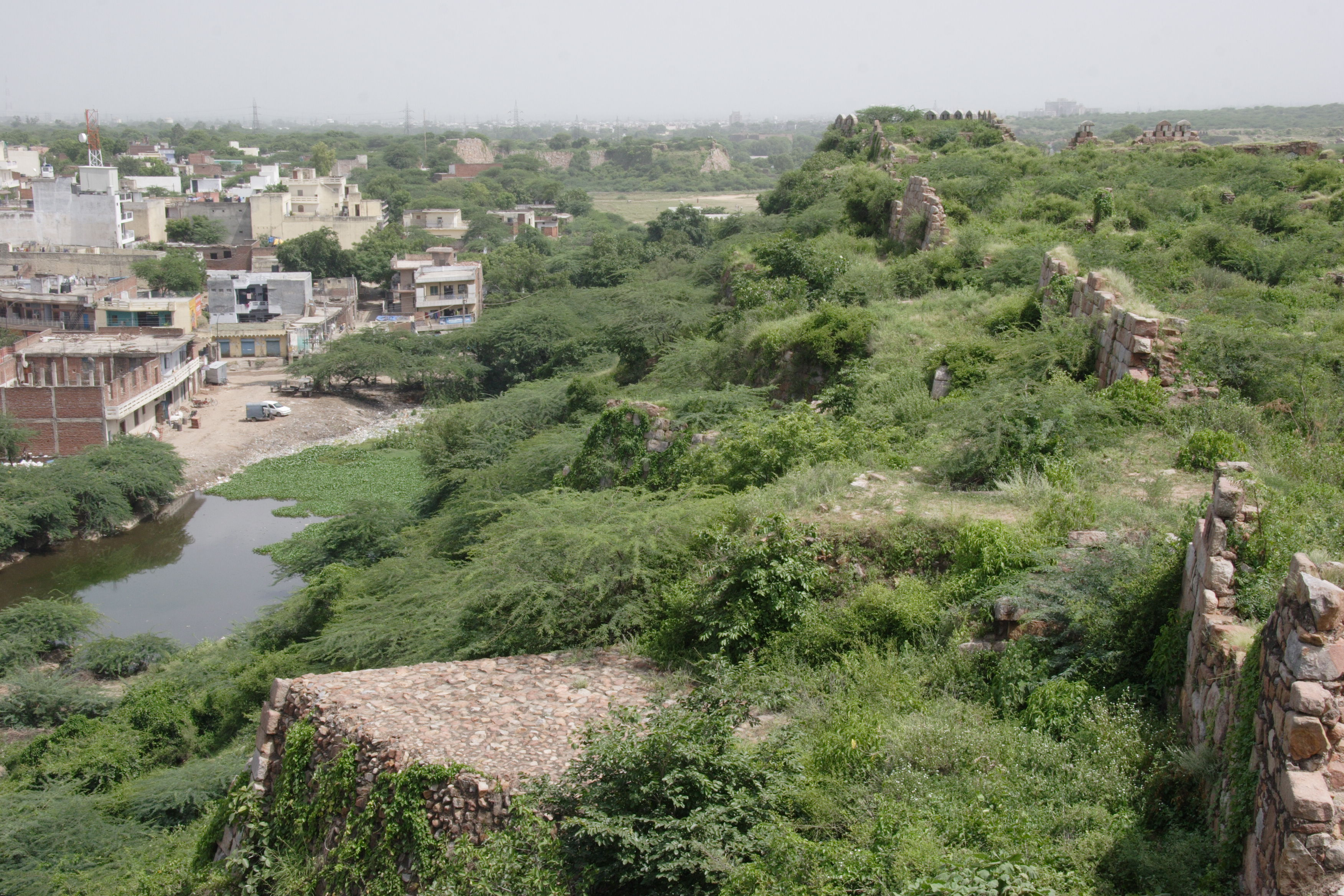
Modern settlement activity spreading in the area of the old city just below the citadel

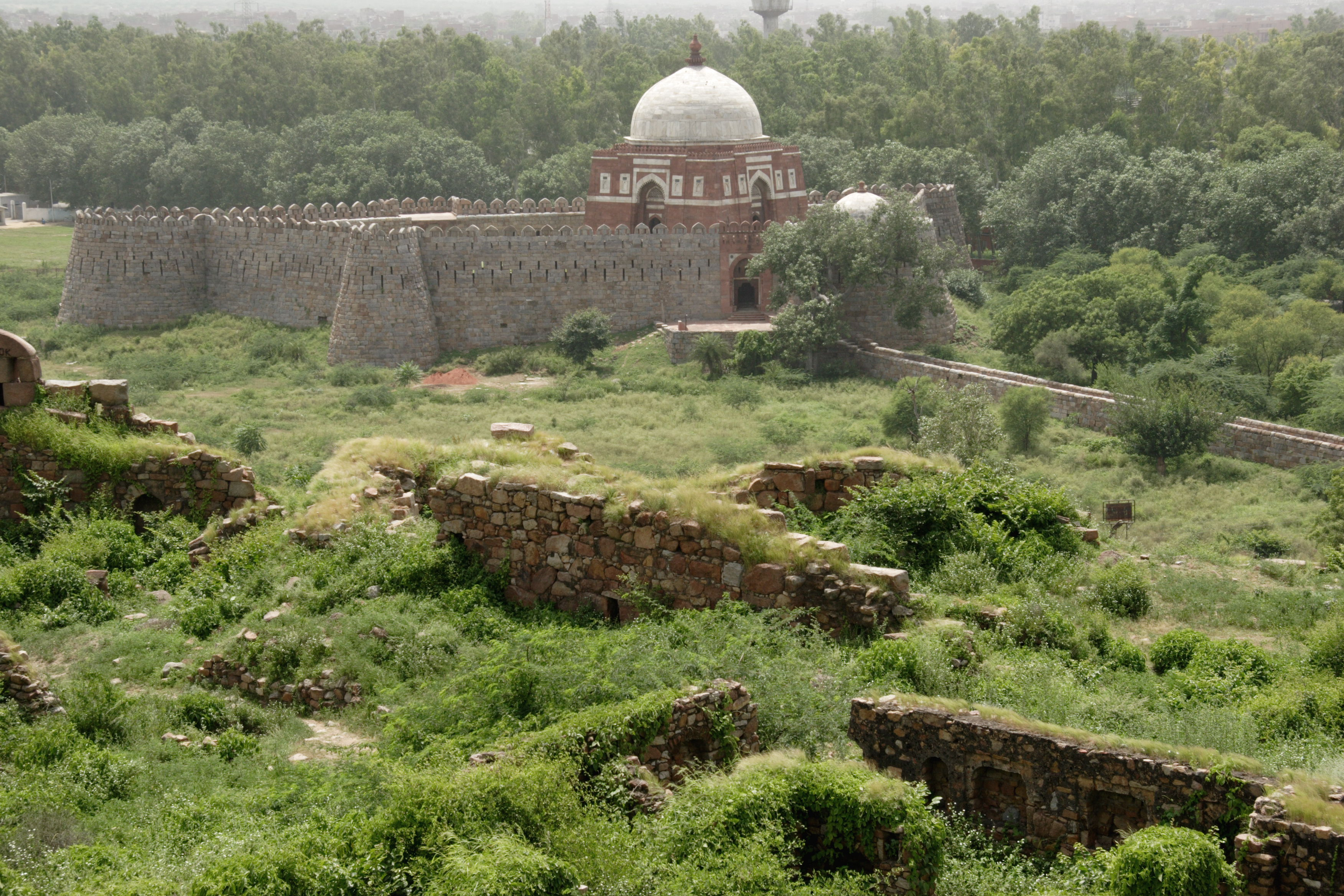
Ghiyath al-Din Tughluq's tomb as seen from Tughluqabad

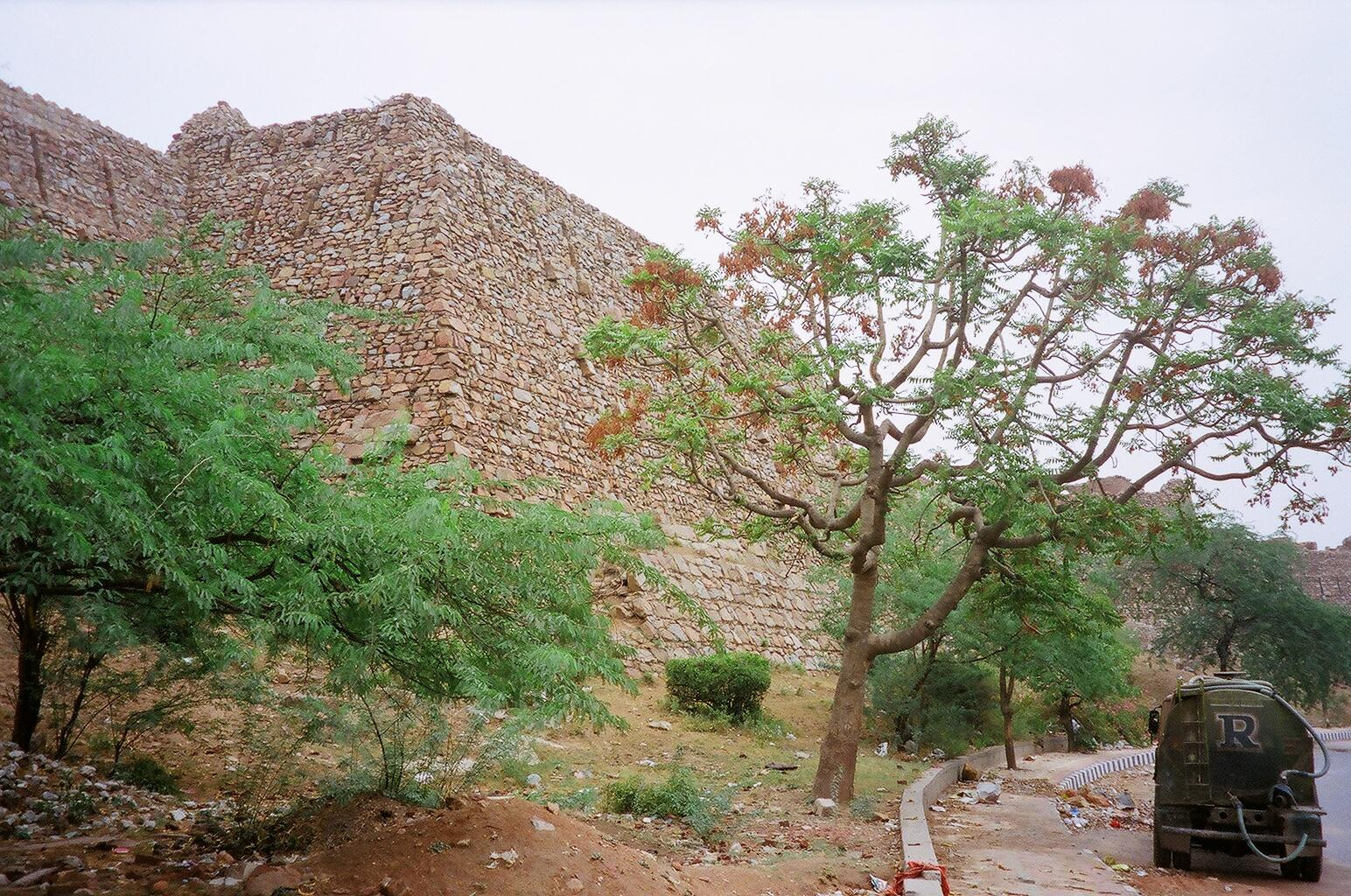
Tughlaqabad massive fort wall

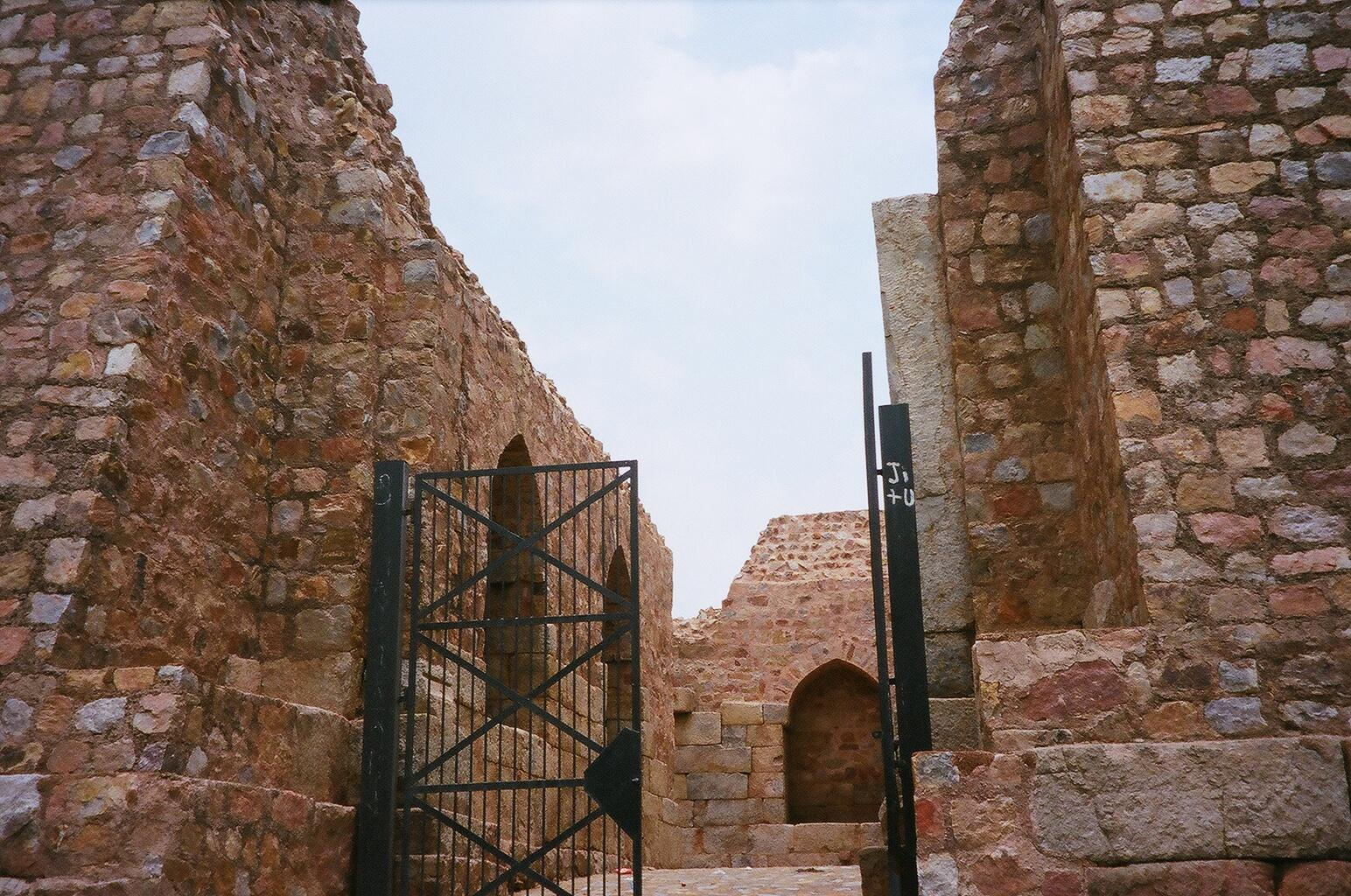
South gate entry to Tughlaqbad fort

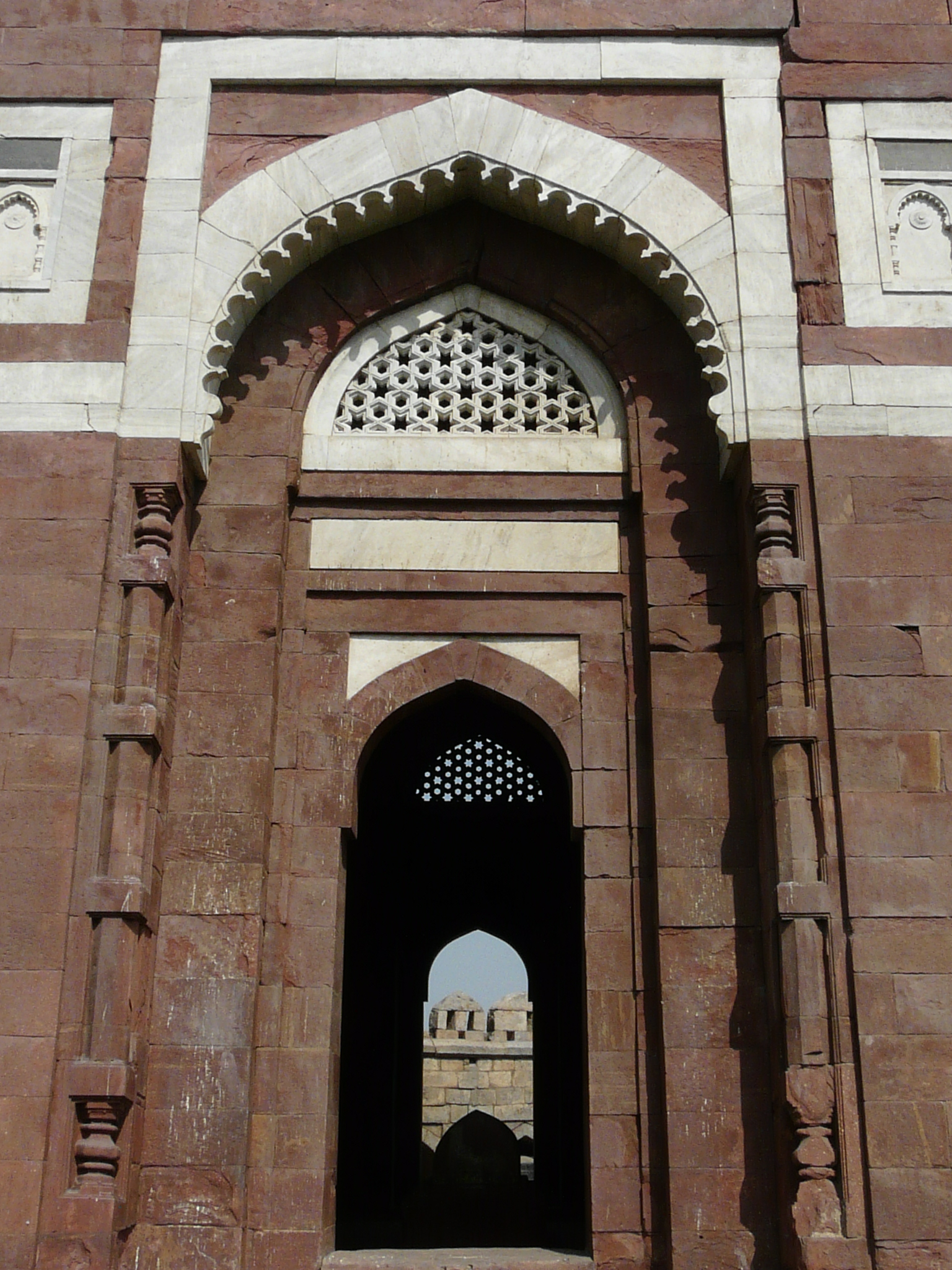
Entrance of the Mausoleum of Ghiyath al-Din Tughluq

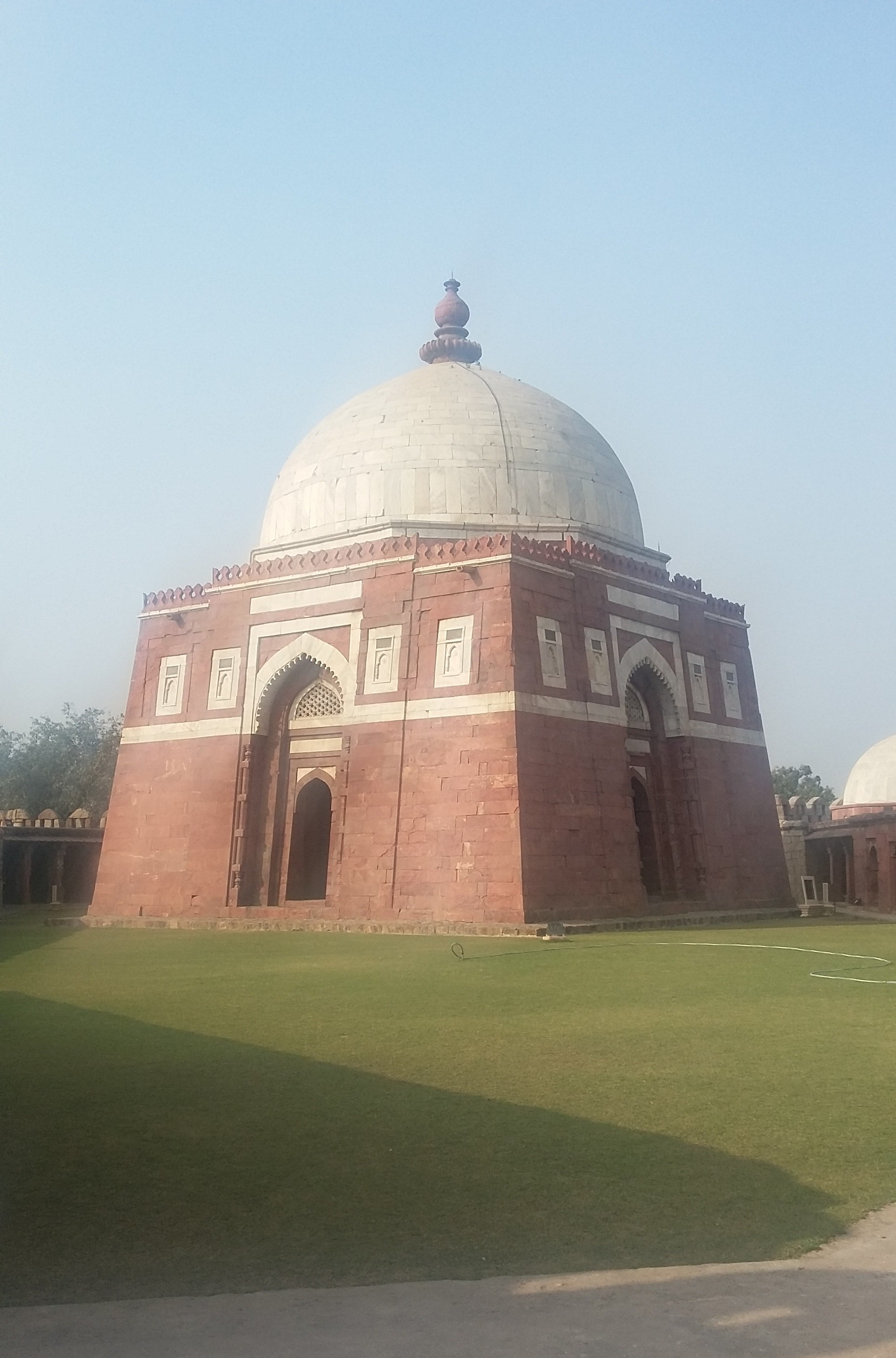
Tomb of Ghiyath al-Din Tughluq and his son Muhammad Bin Tughlaq

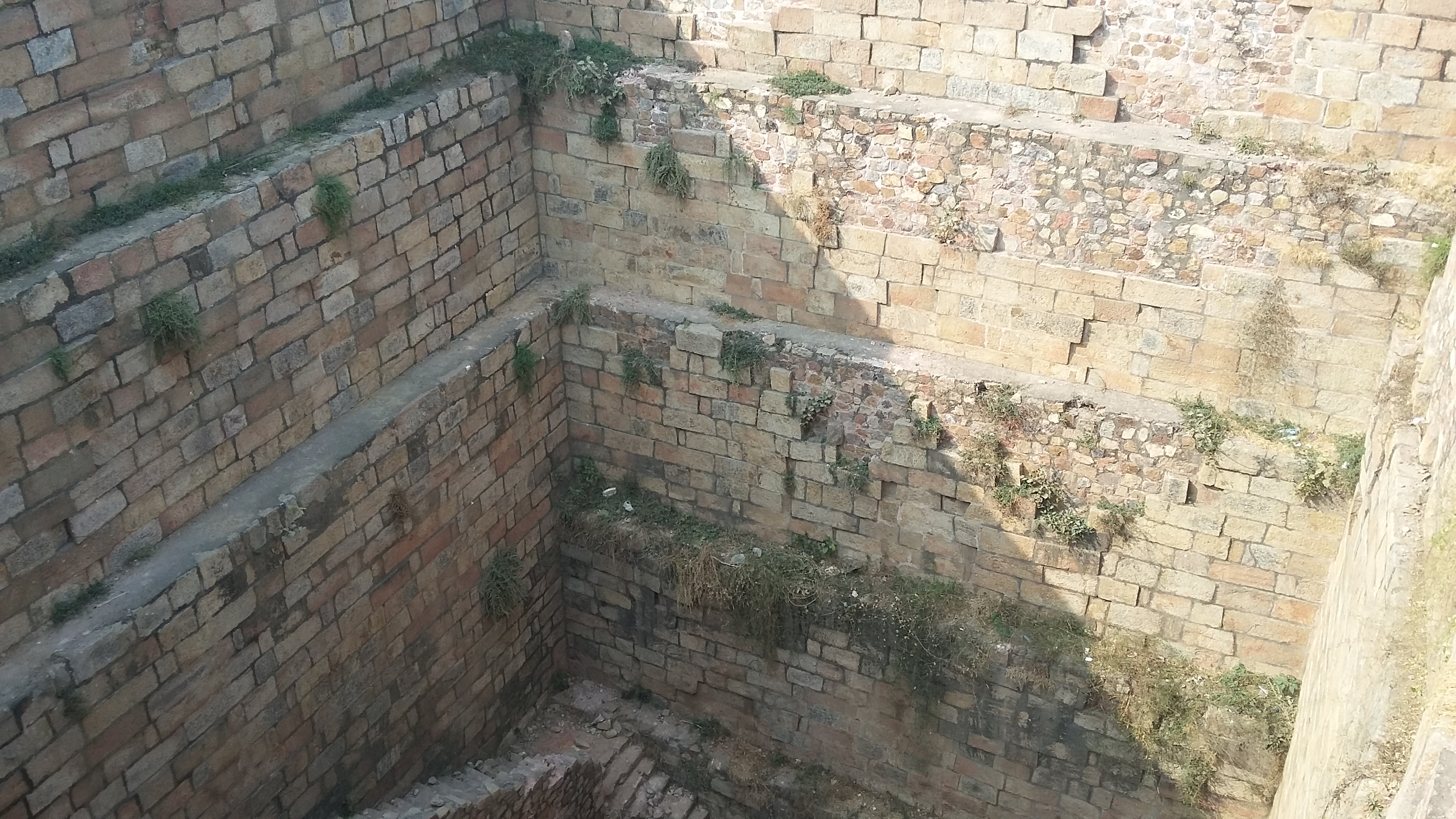
A well inside Tughlaqabad Fort

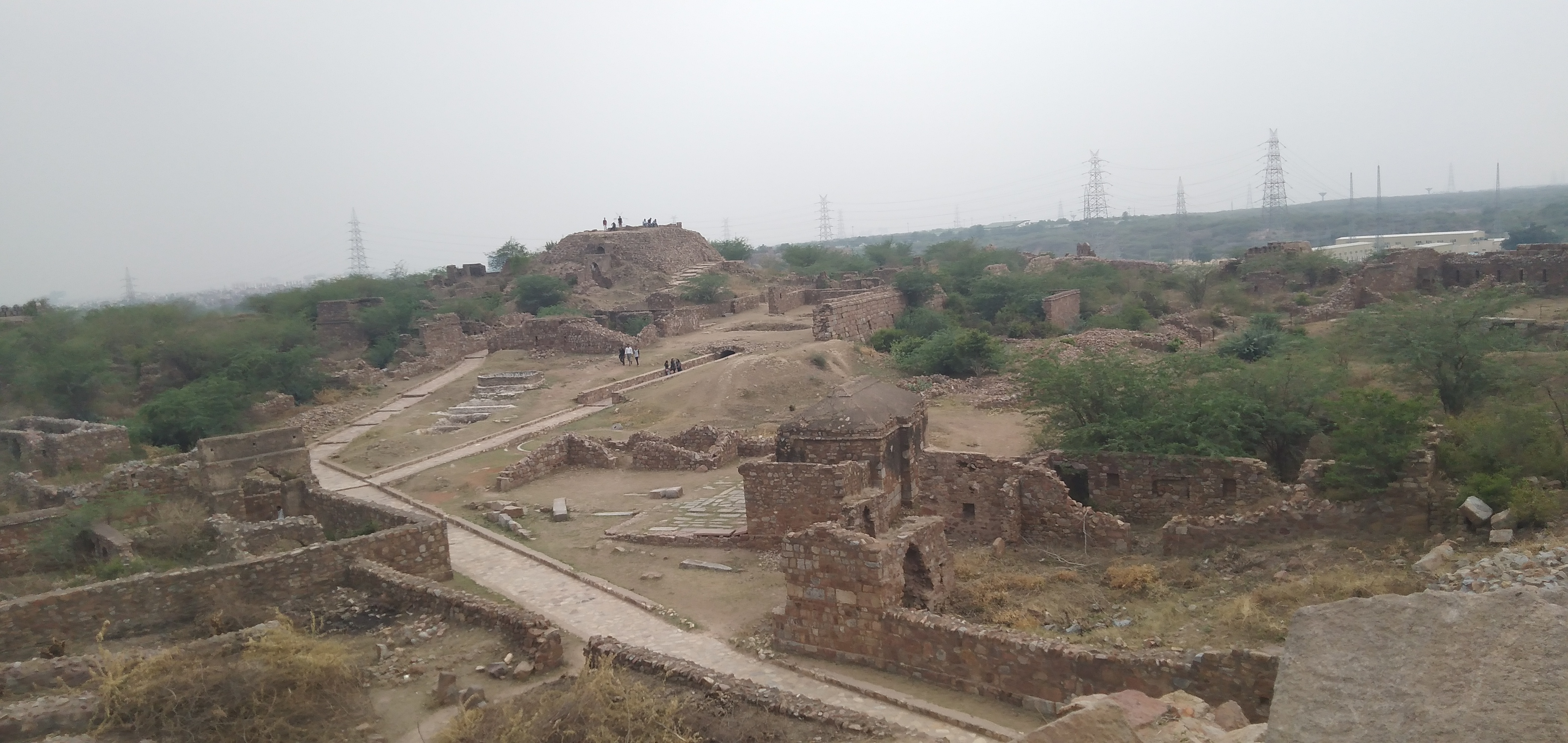
Tughlaqabad Fort Architecture

== See also ==
- Capital forts/palaces in Delhi, oldest first
  - Purana Qila, earliest Hindu rulers
    - Indraprastha, earlier than 1000 BCE
    - Ashokan Edicts in Delhi (r. 268 to 232 BCE) of Maurya Empire
  - Anangpur, by Anangpal I of Tomara dynasty (r. 736–1152 CE)
  - Qila Rai Pithora
    - Lal Kot, by Tomara dynasty (1152–1177 CE) as capital
    - Qila Rai Pithora, the Lal Kot expended by Prithviraj Chauhan (also called Rai Pithora, r. 1177–92 CE) of Chauhan dynasty
  - Siri Fort, by Alauddin Khalji (r. 1296–1316), second ruler of Khalji Dynasty
  - Tughlaqabad Fort, by Ghiyassudin Tughluq (r. 1320–25 CE) of Tughluq dynasty
  - Feroz Shah Kotla, by Feroz Shah Tughluq (r. 1351–88 CE) of Tughluq dynasty
  - Salimgarh Fort, in 1546 CE by Salim Shah Suri (r. 1545–54 CE), son of Sher Shah Suri
  - Red Fort, built in 1639–48 CE by Mughal emperor Shah Jahan when he moved his capital from Agra to Delhi
  - Rashtrapati Bhavan, built in 1912–29 by colonial British raj
- History of Delhi
  - Paleolithic sites in & around Tughlaqabad Fort
  - Stepwells of Delhi
