= Kanneda =

2025 Indian television series

- Promotional release poster
- Genre: Crime; Drama
- Written by: Sandeep Jain; Rajiv Walia; Chandan Arora
- Directed by: Chandan Arora
- Starring: Parmish Verma; Mohammed Zeeshan Ayyub; Ranvir Shorey; Arunoday Singh; Aadar Malik; Jasmin Bajwa
- Music by: Parmish Verma
- Country of origin: India
- Original language: Hindi
- No. of episodes: 8

Production
- Producer: Ajay G. Rai
- Camera setup: Multi-camera
- Production company: JAR Pictures

Original release
- Network: JioHotstar
- Release: 21 March 2025

Kanneda is a 2025 Indian Hindi-language crime drama television series directed by Chandan Arora. Produced under JAR Pictures, it stars Parmish Verma, Mohammed Zeeshan Ayyub, Ranvir Shorey, Arunoday Singh, Aadar Malik and Jasmin Bajwa. The series premiered on 21 March 2025 on JioHotstar.

It follows the tale of an Indian Punjabi rapper in Vancouver, Canada surviving with discrimination, diss and drugs.

== Cast ==
- Parmish Verma as Nirmal Chahal
- Mohammed Zeeshan Ayyub as Rawat
- Ranvir Shorey as Ranjit bajwa
- Arunoday Singh as Sarabjit
- Aadar Malik as Daljeet
- Jasmin Bajwa as Harleen

== Production ==
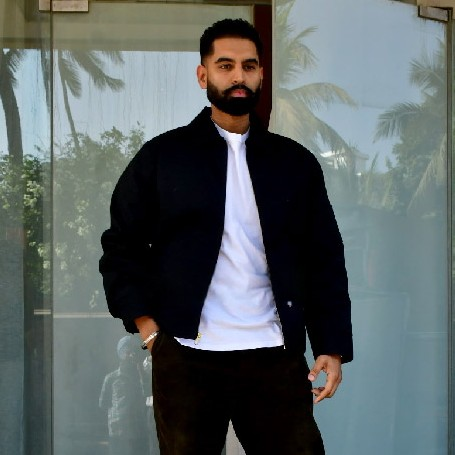
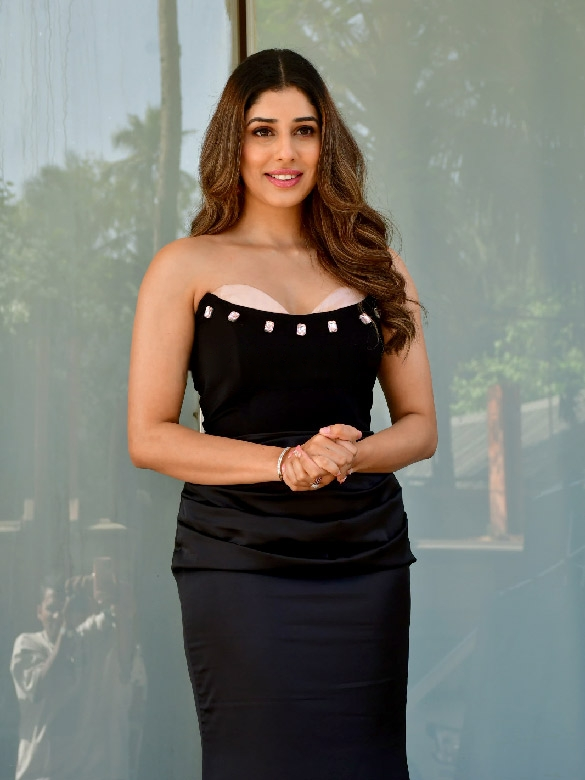
Parmish Verma as Nimma (left) and Jasmin Bajwa as Harleen (right).

Principal photography of the series reportedly began in 2023. The trailer of the series was released on 26 February 2025.

== Music ==
Kanneda

Soundtrack album by Parmish Verma
- Released: 28 February 2025
- Genre: Soundtrack
- Length: 11:41
- Language: Hindi
- Label: Parmish Verma Films

The music for Kanneda is composed by Parmish Verma.

Tracklisting
No.	Title	Length
1.	"Assin Munde Aan Punjab De"	2:06
2.	"Desiya Da Daur"	2:05
3.	"Je Dar Kolon Daronge"	2:17
4.	"Saah"	3:01
5.	"Gori Police (Laal Rang Dian Akhan)"	2:12
Total length:		11:41

== Release ==
The series was made available to stream on JioHotstar on 21 March 2025.

== Reception ==
Devesh Sharma of Filmfare gave three and a half stars out of five. Kanneda received 4 out of 5 stars from Vineeta Kumar of India Today.
