= Imran Zahid =

Indian actor (born 1982)

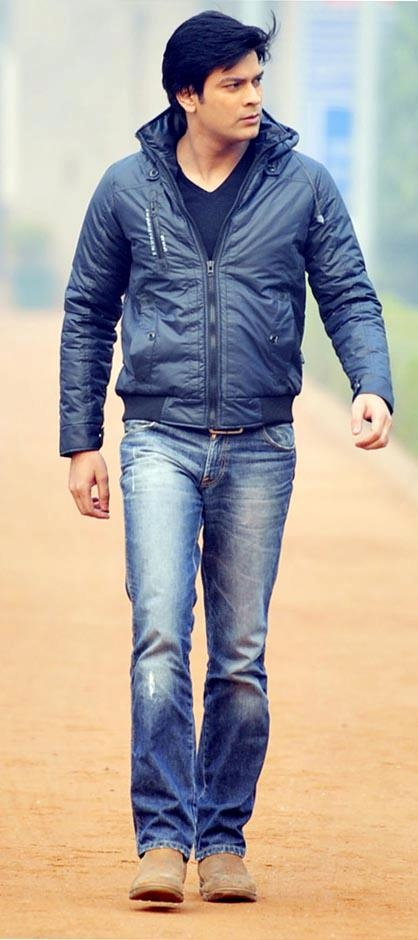
- Imran Zahid
- Born: January 11, 1982 (age 44); Bokaro Steel City, Bokaro district, Jharkhand
- Occupation: Actor
- Years active: 2010–present

Imran Zahid (born 11 January 1982) is an Indian actor in both theatre and Bollywood. He has acted in Mahesh Bhatt's The Last Salute, based on Iraqi journalist Muntadhar al-Zaidi's book of the same title and the stageplay The Arth, based on Bhatt's movie Arth. His latest play was Daddy based on Bhatt's movie of the same name.

== Early life ==
Imran Zahid was born in Bokaro Steel City, Bokaro district of Jharkhand.

He began acting while at DAV Public School, Sector IV in Bokaro Steel City. He then attended Hindu College, Delhi University, from where he got a B.Com degree.

== Acting ==
While at university Zahid became involved with a theatre group run by Arvind Gaur. He continued acting while being employed as a professor.

Zahid has said that he had neither the desire nor the need to work in Mumbai. It had been announced in 2010 that he would act in the lead role for Chandu, a film by Mahesh Bhatt about Jawaharlal Nehru University student leader and Communist Party of India (Marxist–Leninist) Liberation member Chandrashekhar Prasad, who was shot dead on 31 March 1997 during a political rally. He had met Bhatt at a conference in Dubai in 2007 and it was then that Bhatt asked him to take part in the film. The proposed film attracted criticism from students at the university. In 2013, the project was scrapped due to opposition to its production and concerns of potential legal hurdles as a result of the cases related to the assassination being sub judice at the time. The project was revived in 2016 and is currently under production.

He played the role of Muntadhar Al Zaidi in The Last Salute, Bhatt's production based on the shoe-hurling incident involving George W. Bush. Bhatt has proposed to make a film of it with Zahid reprising the role.

It was announced that Zahid would act in Bhatt's Bollywood film Jannat 2 but he subsequently pulled out of the role in favour of playing the part of a narcotics detective in another Bhatt film, Jism 2.

Zahid played the role of the protagonist - a journalist investigating atrocities - in a Bhatt-produced play, Trial of Errors, that opened on 29 March 2013 in Delhi.

Zahid played the lead role in a stage adaptation of Bhatt of his movie, Arth. Zahid also played the lead role of the father in Mahesh Bhatt theatrical adaptation of his film Daddy. Zahid will play the lead role in a remake of Bhatt autobiographical movie, Janam.

He additionally played the lead role in stage adaptation of bhatt's self-portraying movie Hamari Adhuri Kahani in which Bhatt has sung a cover version of the title track for this play and actor Zahid cheered for his depiction as lead actor.

In 2016, Zahid played the part of Protheus in an adaptation of Shakespeare's The Two Gentlemen of Verona.

== Recognition ==
The Hindustan Times has said that

Imran Zahid, Mahesh Bhatt's latest discovery, surprises you in more than one way. First, he's not a regular newcomer who's bitten by the 'ambition' bug; he wants to rather fly very very slow with the support of his mentor Mahesh Bhatt. Second he's still based in Delhi, despite having reportedly securing two big films Bollywood films; and third he has a composure of a veteran who's been there and seen it all.

== Personal life ==
Zahid has said that his preference is to have an arranged marriage and that as of 2010 he was not dating.

== Filmography ==
=== Films ===
Year	Title	Role	Notes	Ref.
2012	Jannat 2	Inspector Vijay Thakur	Debut film	
2012	Jism 2	a Narcotics Detective and Kabir's assistant	Hindi film	
2017	Angrezi Mein Kehte Hain	Ravi	Hindi film	
2019	Marksheet	Ranjit Don	Hindi film	
2023	Ab Dilli Dur Nahin	Lead role as Abhay Shukla		

=== Telivision ===
Year	Title	Role	Notes	Ref.
2014-2015	Mere Rang Mein Rangne Waali	Sudhakar Pathak	Debut Serial	
