= Jasmin Bajwa =

Indian actress and model

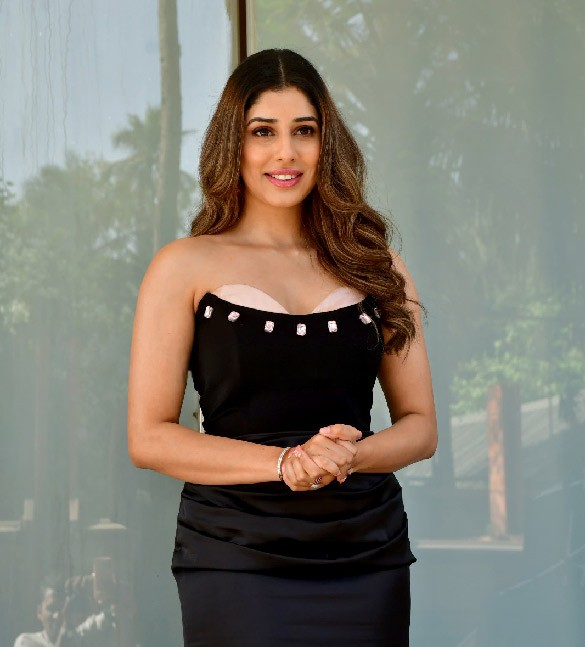
- Bajwa in March 2025
- Occupations: Actress and model
- Years active: 2018–present

Jasmin Bajwa is an Indian actress and model who predominantly works in Punjabi films. Bajwa made her acting debut with the Punjabi web series Yaar Jigree Kasooti Degree and made her Hindi film debut with Soorma. She acted in the music video of the Sharry Mann song "Birthday Gift". She played the lead role in the Punjabi films Doorbeen and Gaddi Jaandi Ae Chalaangaan Maardi.

== Career ==
Bajwa made her career debut in the 2018 web series Yaar Jigree Kasuti Degree. She later worked in the Hindi films Soorma and Manmarziyaan. In 2019, She played the lead role in the Punjabi film Doorbeen.

She later acted in other Punjabi films such as Sufna, Fuffad Ji, Sohranyan Da Pind Aa Gaya and more. She started her modeling career in 2020 with Sharry Mann's song "Birthday Gift".

She played a supporting role in the Punjabi-language comedy film Jatt and Juliet 3 directed by Jagdeep Sidhu, alongside Diljit Dosanjh and Neeru Bajwa. It became the 2nd highest-grossing Punjabi film of all time. She worked in Parmish Verma web series Kanneda, which came out in 2025. This web series was released on JioHotstar.

== Filmography ==
=== Films ===
Key
†	Denotes films that have not yet been released

Year	Title	Role	Language	Notes	Ref.
2018	Soorma	Minaxi Singh	Hindi	Debut Hindi film	
2018	Manmarziyaan	Keraat	Hindi		
2019	Doorbeen	Sohnai	Punjabi	Debut Punjabi film	
2020	Sufna	Tasveer	Punjabi		
2021	Fuffad Ji	Paali	Punjabi		
2022	Khaao Piyo Aish Karo		Punjabi		
2023	Sohranyan Da Pind Aa Geya	Sanjh	Punjabi		
2023	Gaddi Jaandi Ae Chalaangaan Maardi		Punjabi		
2024	Jatt & Juliet 3		Punjabi		

=== Web series ===
Year	Title	Role	Language	Notes	Ref.
2018	Yaar Jigree Kasooti Degree	Daizy Garewal	Punjabi		
2025	Kanneda	Harleen	Hindi		
