= Pukhraj Bhalla =

Indian actor and singer (born 1994)

- Born: India
- Education: Punjabi University
- Occupations: Actor; singer
- Years active: 2013–present
- Known for: Yaar Jigree Kasooti Degree
- Spouse: Dishu Sidhu (2022-present)
- Parents: Jaswinder Bhalla (father); Parmdeep Bhalla (mother)

Pukhraj Bhalla is an Indian-Punjabi actor and singer. He is the son of comedian-actor Jaswinder Bhalla. He is best known for the web-series Yaar Jigree Kasooti Degree directed by Rabby Tiwana.

== Career ==
Pukhraj who made his debut in Pollywood with "Stupid 7″ in 2013 has been already seen unveiling his prowess in acting skills in supporting roles in movies Golak Bugni Bank Te Batua, Vaisakhi List, Harjeeta and Afsar. Now it is going to be performed for his fans to see him performing as a lead actor. The popular Punjabi web-series "Yaar Jigree Kasooti Degree" did not only make its audience re-live their lively college days but it also helped Pukhraj. The webseries depicted real acting prowess of Pukhraj. He is the son of ace comedian of Punjabi industry Jaswinder Bhalla who has set a landmark of his acting. He made his debut in lead role with film Teriyan Meriyan Hera Pheriyan that was released in 2019. In an interview, Bhalla disclosed that, unlike his father, he likes grey shades.

== Filmography ==
Year	Film	Role	Notes
2013	Stupid 7	Sahab	
2013	R.S.V.P.	Heera	
2016	Vaisakhi List	Guri	
2018	Golak Bugni Bank Te Batua	Kala	Directed by Ksshitij Chaudhary
2018	Harjeeta	Manpreet	
2018	Afsar	Sunny	with Tarsem Jassar
2018	Yaar Jigree Kasooti Degree	Jass	Season 1 - Rabby Tiwana
2019	How To Become A Hit Punjabi Singer	Neela Filma Wala	Part-4
2020	Yaar Jigree Kasooti Degree	Jass	Season 2 - Rabby Tiwana
2024	Teriyan Meriyan Hera Pheriyan		blockbuster movie
2024	Meri Vohti Da Vyah		Lead Actor
2021	Jinne Jamme Saare Nikamme		
2022	Haterz		
2022	Mahi Mera Nikka Jeha	Nikka	

== Singles ==
Year	Title	Music Producer	Label	Notes
2018	Zaalma	JT Beats, Kru172	Troll Punjabi	From Yaar Jigree Kasooti Degree (Season 1, Episode 9) Singer - Pukhraj Bhalla, Lyrics - JT Beats
2020	Countless	JT Beats ft. Alaap Sikander	Speed Records	Singer – Pukhraj Bhalla Lyrics – Karan Sandhawalia and Pukhraj Bhalla
2020	Hostel Boliyan	JT Beats	Troll Punjabi	From Yaar Jigree Kasooti Degree (Season 2, Episode 8) Singer – Pukhraj Bhalla Lyrics – Bhindi Tolawal
2020	Dil Haare	JT Beats	Troll Punjabi	From Yaar Jigree Kasooti Degree (Season 2, Episode 13) Singer – Pukhraj Bhalla Lyrics – Karan Sandhawalia
