= Ghund Kadh Le Ni Sohreyan Da Pind Aa Gaya =

Indian Punjabi-language comedy film

- First look poster
- Directed by: Ksshitij Chaudhary
- Written by: Amberdeep Singh
- Produced by: Ankit Vijan; Navdeep Narula; Kiran Yadav; Gurjit Singh
- Starring: Gurnam Bhullar; Sargun Mehta; Jass Bajwa; Jasmin Bajwa
- Cinematography: Ravi Kumar Sana
- Edited by: Bharat S Rawat
- Music by: Gurcharan Singh
- Production companies: Shri Narotam Ji Films Production; Big Bash Producers LLP; Bollywood Heights
- Distributed by: Zee Studios
- Release date: 8 July 2022
- Running time: 130 minutes
- Country: India
- Language: Punjabi

Ghund Kadh Le Ni Sohreyan Da Pind Aa Gaya (In-laws's village has come) is a 2022 Indian Punjabi-language, romantic comedy film directed by Ksshitij Chaudhary and produced by Ankit Vijan, Navdeep Narula and Gurjit Singh. The film was made under the banner of Shri Narotam Ji Films Production, Big Bash Producers LLP and Bollywood Heights and stars Gurnam Bhullar and Sargun Mehta in lead roles. It was released on 8 July 2022 by Zee Studios.

== Synopsis ==
It is story of the 1990s of two lovers, who, wishing to get married, send a matchmaker to the girl's parents to get their permission. As per plan, when the matchmaker arrives, the girl consents to the alliance. Later she realises the match was another boy and she inadvertently agreed to marry him, who also lives in her lover's village. Now if she marries him, she will be living in the same village as her ex-lover. The girl cannot say no to the proposal, and this breaks the boy's heart. To take revenge he starts looking for a girl from the girl's village for marriage. And the rest is shown in a hilarious way including a fight between couples.

== Cast ==
- Gurnam Bhullar as Raja Singh
- Sargun Mehta as Roopinder Kaur Rupi (Roopi)
- Jasmin Bajwa as Sanjh
- Mintu Kapa
- Jass Bajwa as Jassa
- Shivika Diwan
- Hardip Gill
- Baljinder Kaur

== Production ==
The film was announced in 2019 shortly after the release of Surkhi Bindi in August 2019 and principal photography began on 13 September 2019 in Ganganagar, Rajasthan. Due to COVID-19 pandemic the film production was indefinitely postponed. Now after completing the film it is slated for release in July.

== Music ==
Soundtrack of the film is composed by Laddi Gill, V RAX Music, Daoud Music and Chet Singh and lyrics are written by Gurnam Bhullar. The soundtrack is released on Zee Music Company. First track "Sohreyan Da Pind Aa Gaya" was released on June 25, 2022. Second track "Jaan War Daa" was released on 28 June.

=== Track list ===
No.	Title	Lyrics	Music	Singer(s)	Length
1.	"Sohreyan Da Pind Aa Gaya"	Gurnam Bhullar	Laddi Gill	Gurnam Bhullar	2:48
2.	"Jaan War Daa"	Gurnam Bhullar	Daoud Music	Gurnam Bhullar	2:48
3.	"Mishri Di Dali"	Gurnam Bhullar	V Rakx Music	Gurnam Bhullar	3:05
4.	"Saheli"	Gurnam Bhullar	Chet Singh	Gurnam Bhullar	2:35
5.	"Dil Rukda"	Gurnam Bhullar	Daoud Music	Gurnam Bhullar	3:21

== Release ==
On 2 July 2022 the title of the film was changed from "Sohreyan Da Pind Aa Gaya" to "Ghund Kadh Le Ni Sohreyan Da Pind Aa Gaya" The film was initially scheduled for release on 29 May 2020, but, it was indefinitely postponed due to the COVID-19 pandemic. It was released on 8 July 2022 by Zee Studios.

=== Home media ===
The film was available for streaming on Zee5 from 23 September 2022.

== Reception ==
Neha Vashist rated the film with 3.5 stars out of 5 and appreciated the story by Amberdeep Singh, writing, "we have to appreciate the writer Amberdeep Singh as well for the hysterical lines and punches", and also appreciated direction of Ksshitij Chaudhary stating, "Ksshitij Chaudhary as the captain of the ship also did great work in directing every sequence in a way that leaves the audience laughing in their seats." Praising the performance of Sargun Mehta and Gurnam Bhullar, she wrote, "it is hard to beat their on-screen chemistry." Vashist criticised the length of the film and ending stating, "ending seemed a bit predictable and abrupt at the same time". Concluding the review for The Times of India, she said, "all we have to say is that it is a hilarious love-revenge story that will give you a good dose of laughter." Kiddan rated the film with 4 stars out of 5 and praised the performances of lead actors writing, "Gurnam Bhullar and Sargun Mehta were phenomenal in their characters." Praising the direction they wrote, "Kshhitij has managed to give the right direction to every character, scene and story like a pro". They were critical of climax, as they stated, "The only reason behind the deduction of one star is the weak climax and ending of the film." Kidaan concluded, "it definitely is a must-watch for everyone. It is a project which we can call a true entertainer, light on mind and a bundle of joy."
