= Shruti Sodhi =

Indian actress

- Born: 22 September 1988 (age 37); New Delhi, India
- Occupation: Actress

Shruti Sodhi is an Indian film actress who works primarily in Telugu and Punjabi films. She was born on 22 September 1988, in New Delhi.

== Career ==
Shruti Sodhi studied in New Delhi, and has a degree in philosophy. Shruti worked as a news anchor in two Hindi channels. Shruti made her Telugu debut with Pataas, which released in January 2015. Shruti has also worked in four Punjabi films like Happy Go Lucky, Mr & Mrs 420, Vaisakhi List and Dil Vil Pyaar Vyaar.

== Filmography ==
Year	Title	Role	Language	Notes	Ref.
2014	Happy Go Lucky	Jas	Punjabi	Debut film	
2014	Dil Vil Pyaar Vyaar	Jas	Punjabi		
2014	Mr & Mrs 420	Jasmeet	Punjabi		
2015	Pataas	Mahathi	Telugu	Telugu debut	
2016	Vaisakhi List	Aman	Punjabi		
2016	Supreme	Herself	Telugu	Special appearance in "Taxi Vaala" song	
2016	Meelo Evaru Koteeswarudu	Priya	Telugu		
2017	Buddies in India	Princess Iron Fan	Mandarin		
2023	Ab Dilli Dur Nahin	Niyati	Hindi		
2025	Oka Padhakam Prakaram	Kavitha	Telugu		
