= Vaisakhi List =

2016 Indian film by Smeep Kang

- Directed by: Smeep Kang
- Screenplay by: Vaibhav Suman; Shreya Srivastava
- Story by: Vaibhav Suman; Shreya Srivastava
- Produced by: Munish Sahni
- Starring: Jimmy Sheirgill; Shruti Sodhi; Sunil Grover; Jaswinder Bhalla; B.N. Sharma; Binnu Dhillon
- Cinematography: Binendra Menon
- Edited by: Ajay Sharma
- Music by: Jaidev Kumar
- Production company: Gakhal Bros. Ent.
- Distributed by: White Hill Studios; Gakhal Entertainment Inc.
- Release date: 22 April 2016
- Running time: 133 minutes
- Country: India
- Language: Punjabi

Vaisakhi List is a 2016 Punjabi film directed by Smeep Kang, starring Jimmy Sheirgill, Shruti Sodhi and Sunil Grover as the main cast. The film was released on 22 April 2016.

== Plot ==
Prisoner Tarsem Lal is seen coming out of a hole in the jail's garden, and is almost caught by Jailer Jalaur Singh Johal, who is very friendly with the prisoners. After talking to each other, they hear another prisoner, Jarnail Singh, arguing with Aman, a girl who was his bride-to-be before being arrested.

After arguing with Aman, Tarsem Lal goes to comfort Jarnail, and asks about the argument. Jarnail tells his story. Before being arrested, Jarnail was a dairy farmer who sold milk in the village. He goes to meet Aman's family, and wants to marry her. Aman, talking to Jarnail privately, says that she wants a love marriage, while Aman's brother wants her to marry his friend, in exchange for drugs. Jarnail decides to refuse the marriage proposal on Aman's behalf, and tells his friend, Baljit.

Sometime later, Jarnail finds that Aman teaches English to the elderly. Jarnail decides to join Aman's class, and Aman eventually falls in love with him. Jarnail goes back to Aman's family, and re-establish the marriage proposal, but Aman's brother seems unhappy.

On the way back home from Aman's house, he is stopped and checked by a Police officer, who finds opium in one of his milk cans. Although Jarnail claims innocence, he is still arrested, and Aman's family breaks ties with him. Jarnail believes that Aman's brother is responsible for his arrest, but Aman doesn't believe him. Aman came to the jail today to tell him that her marriage is fixed, and she will be married tomorrow, on Vaisakhi. Tarsem then tells Jarnail that they can escape the jail, but Jarnail, who knows that Tarsem has tried escaping multiple times, doesn't believe him.

Later, Tarsem tells his story. Prior to his arrest, Tarsem sold toys on his bike, and his only joy was his son. While he wanted his son to go to school, he wasn't worried about his son's grades, only that his son was happy. One day, while walking his son back from school, a police officer almost runs over Tarsem's son on his scooter. Tarsem, angry at the officer, slaps him. He is arrested for attacking an officer. While his original time in prison was supposed to be for a few months, his multiple attempts at escaping(including pole-vaulting over the walls, have failed, and have caused him to increase his jail time. Tarsem tells Jarnail that his only reason for escaping is so he can see his son again. Jarnail asks Tarsem how he plans to escape. Tarsem explains that he dug a tunnel in the jail's garden, and that he has a copy of each cell block's keys.
That night, Jarnail and Tarsem escape through the tunnel, and steal two guys' shirts and car. Jarnail drops Tarsem off at his house, and Jarnail goes to Aman's house. Aman and Jarnail elope. Tarsem goes to see his grandparents, but they are all unhappy to see him, as he tells that he escaped, when he had only one month left. Tarsem then sees son, but when his son unwilling to come with him, Tarsem is hurt. He then stays outside the house, hoping his son will forgive him.

The next morning, Jalaur is preparing the jail for a Vaisakhi Celebration, and the Jail Minister is coming. He also asks for the constables to bring Jarnail and Tarsem to his office, but they are nowhere to be found.

Jarnail and Aman make a stop, where Jarnail wants to call Jalaur, as he doesn't want Jalaur's job to suffer for his and Tarsem's escape. Jalaur answers, in a good mood, although surprised that Jarnail is calling him. Jalaur tells Jarnail that he has a surprise for him: On Vaisakhi day, those who were arrested for minor crimes are to be released, which includes Jarnail and Tarsem. Jarnail tells Jalaur that they escaped through a tunnel last night. Jalaur then tells Jarnail to find Tarsem and get back to the jail via the tunnel as soon as possible, or they will all be in trouble. Jalaur then tells the constables to keep Jarnail and Tarsem's escape a secret, and find Tarsem's tunnel. They do, but fill it with sand before telling Jalaur, who is now more upset.

Jarnail and Aman go back and find Tarsem, and show him today's newspaper. He shows it to his son, where it shows that Tarsem and Jarnail are to be officially released. Tarsem then leaves, saying he'll be back once his name is cleared.

Tarsem and Jarnail first stop at Baljit house. At first, Jarnail talks to Baljit, as he wants Baljit to hide Aman from her family until his name is cleared. However, Aman calls Jarnail back when Baljit is not looking, as Aman is engaged to Baljit. The three then head back to the prison, while avoiding Aman's brother.

Meanwhile, Tarsem's brother-in-law, Bheem, sees in the newspaper about Tarsem's release, and goes to the prison to greet him. However, after finding out that Tarsem escaped, Jalaur has Bheem take one of his constables to Tarsem's favorite places, so that they can find Tarsem.

As Tarsem and Jarnail are driving back to the prison, they are chased by a police officer, along with the people that they stole the car from. Fortunately, Bheem and the constable are nearby and stall the constable.

Meanwhile, Jalaur must stall a pair of news-reporters(one who is the niece of the Jail Minister), who want to interview Tarsem and Jarnail. After trying to get them to eat sweets and snacks, as well as give them a tour of the place, Jalaur decides to scare them by giving them two other prisoners to interview, who are also named Tarsem and Jarnail, but have only been recently been put in prison for 1st-degree murder.

As Tarsem and Jarnail are getting close, they are soon stopped by Baljit, Baljit's father, and some thugs. He tells him that he is here for Aman, as they are getting married today, and reveals that he wanted to marry Aman before. After Jarnail's first marriage proposal broke, Baljit sent his own proposal, which broke after Aman agreed to marrying Jarnail. Baljit angry, decided to hide drugs in Jarnail's milk cans, and told the police officer to check the cans when Jarnail came by. Baljit won't allow Jarnail to pass unless he leaves Aman. Jarnail, with help from Tarsem then fights Baljit and his thugs. After knocking them out, they continue on their way.

At the prison, the Jail Minister, MLA Satpal Mander, and his assistant has arrived, making Jalaur even more nervous. Jalaur and the constables then try and stall the Minister, hoping Tarsem and Jarnail hurry and arrive.

Once outside the prison walls, Tarsem goes to the tunnel entrance, only to find that it's been filled with sand. Knowing it would take too long to dig out the sand, the two then try multiple ways to get over the walls, all which fail. As Jarnail suggests pole-vaulting over, Tarsem starts giving up hope. Jarnail convinces him that he will do it, that he must do it, for his son's sake.

At the same time, The Jail Minister is making a speech, and then asks Jalaur to come up and say a few words before bringing out Tarsem and Jarnail. Jalaur, feeling hopeless, decides to come clean. However, before he can admit the pair's escape, Tarsem and Jarnail jump and land in front of everyone.

Tarsem and Jarnail's release is officially signed. As the Jail Minister is leaving, his assistant says that it seemed like they broke in by the way they appeared. However, the Jail Minister ignores this. Tarsem meets with his family, and he and his son reconcile. Jarnail meets with Aman's family, having learned of Baljit's trickery and once again fix the alliance between Jarnail and Aman.

== Cast ==
- Jimmy Sheirgill as Jarnail Singh
- Shruti Sodhi as Aman
- Sunil Grover as Tarsem Lal
- Jaswinder Bhalla as Jailer Jalaur Singh Johal
- Binnu Dhillon as MLA Satpal Mandher
- Rana Ranbir as Bheem Chand (Tarsem's brother-in-law)
- B.N. Sharma as Sub-Inspector Bahadur Singh
- Bal Mukand Sharma as Head Constable Tulsi Das
- Prince Kanwaljit Singh as Head Constable Baljeet Singh
- Nisha Bano as News reporter
- Mannat Singh as Second news reporter
- Pukhraj Bhalla as Guri (Aman's brother)
- Seema Kaushal as Balbir Kaur (Aman's mother)
- Sunny Gill as Aman's father
- Gurinder Dimpy as Jeeta (MLA's PA)
- Abhiroy Cheema as Baljeet
- Darshan Aulakh as Inspector in town
- Gurpreet Bhangu as Tarsem's mother-in-law
- Vijay Tandon as Tarsem's father-in-law
- Anmol Verma as Tarsem's son
- Gurbachchan Singh as Chacha
- Harpal Singh as Jarnail (another qaidi in jail)
- Gurinder Makna as Tarsem (another qaidi in jail)
- Harby Sangha as Jeep owner (guest appearance)
- Karamjit Anmol as Cyclist (guest appearance)
- Naresh Kathooria as Cycle rider
- Jaswinder Makrauna as Binder (Guri's friend)

== Release ==
Vaisakhi List was released on 22 April 2016.
