= Ab Dilli Dur Nahin (2023 film) =

Drama Film

- theatrical poster
- Directed by: Kamal Chandra
- Written by: Dinesh Gautam
- Produced by: Vinay Bhardwaj; Syed Z Sanjay Mawar
- Starring: Mahesh Bhatt; Imran Zahid; Shruti Sodhi; Satyakam Anand
- Cinematography: Shrikant Asati
- Edited by: Ramkishan Suthar
- Production companies: Moonlight Film and Theater Studios; Shining Sun Studios
- Release date: 12 May 2023
- Country: India
- Language: Hindi

Ab dilli dur nahin (transl. Now Delhi is not far away) (Note: A play on the phrase Delhi is still far off (meaning the work is still not complete).) is a 2023 Indian Hindi-language drama film written by Dinesh Gautam and directed by Kamal Chandra. It is produced by Moonlight Film and Theater Studios & Shining Sun Studios. The film is inspired by the life of Govind Jaiswal, an IAS officer from Bihar.

== Plot ==
"Ab Dilli Dur Nahin" is an emotional drama that follows the inspiring journey of Abhay Shukla, a young man from a small town in Bihar who dreams of becoming an IAS officer. With his family struggling to make ends meet, Abhay moves to Delhi to pursue his aspirations, encountering numerous obstacles along the way. Inspired by the real-life story of Govind Jaiswal, a rickshaw puller's son who became an IAS officer in 2007, the film explores the themes of success and failure through Abhay's struggles to achieve his goal. Actor Zahid, who portrays Abhay, had the privilege of meeting Jaiswal to gain insight into his character and willpower, which further motivated him to portray the role with authenticity. From facing societal norms and political issues to cultural ironies, Abhay's journey is an arduous one, filled with insurmountable hurdles that he must overcome to fulfill his dreams and lift his family out of poverty.

== Cast ==
- Mahesh Bhatt as Devesh Kapoor
- Imran Zahid as Abhay Shukla
- Shruti Sodhi as Niyati
- Satyakam Anand as Shanu
- Rajiv Mishra as Sunny

== Production ==
Most of the shooting of the film 'Ab Dilli Door Nahi' has been done at places like Mukherjee Nagar, Delhi University, Kamla Nagar, Rajendra Nagar, Connaught Place, Tihar Jail and Govindpuri Police Station in Delhi. Some parts of the film have also been shot in Noida.

== Music ==
The music for Ab Dilli Dur Nahin was composed by Ajay Singha, Abhijeet Gadwe and Tarun Sharma.

== See also ==
- Dilli Abhi Door Hai
