= Dilli Abhi Door Hai =

Hindu-Urdu phrase

"Dilli Abhi Door Hai" (Hindi: दिल्ली अभी दूर है, Urdu: دلی ابھی دور ہے, romanized: dillī abhī dūr hai) is a Hindustani (Hindi-Urdu) phrase from Persian: هنوز دهلی دور است, romanized: hanūz dihlī dūr ast, lit. 'Delhi is still far', meaning there is still work to be done. It was first used by Hazrat Nizamuddin Auliya, a Sufi saint of the Chishti Order. It may be used to invoke a sense of nonchalance about far off threats. It has also been used as a political slogan during the Indian general elections.

== History ==
Hazrat Nizamuddin Auliya and Ghiyasuddin Tughlaq, Sultan of the Tughlaq dynasty, had a strained relationship. Auliya cursed Tughlaq, telling him he could not come to Delhi. Within four years, the region of Tughlaqabad was destroyed, as was the newly made fort in Tughlaqabad.

== Uses ==
The slogan was used by Mughal Emperor Bahadur Shah Zafar when the East India Company was capturing Indian states rapidly.

In modern times, the slogan has been used by politicians, including by Asaduddin Owaisi in reference to Indian National Congress leader and Member of Parliament Rahul Gandhi.

== See also ==
- Ab Dilli Dur Nahin (1957 film)
- Ab Dilli Dur Nahin (2023 film)
