= Ab Dilli Dur Nahin (1957 film) =

- Original Hindi poster
- Directed by: Amar Kumar
- Written by: Rajinder Singh Bedi; Muhafiz Hyder
- Screenplay by: Akhtar Mirza
- Story by: Akhtar Mirza
- Produced by: Raj Kapoor
- Starring: Romi; Sulochana; Yakub; Motilal
- Cinematography: Jaywant Pathare
- Edited by: G. G. Mayekar; Dinakar Shetye
- Music by: Dattaram
- Production company: R. K. Films Ltd.
- Distributed by: R. K. Films Ltd. Shemaroo Video Pvt. Ltd.
- Release date: 1957
- Country: India
- Language: Hindi

Ab Dilli Dur Nahin (transl. Now Delhi is not far away) (Note: A play on the phrase Delhi is still far off (meaning the work is still not complete).) is a 1957 Indian Hindi-language film directed by Amar Kumar and written by Rajinder Singh Bedi and Muhafiz Hyder. The film was produced by Raj Kapoor and starred Yakub, Anwar Hussain, Motilal, Jagdeep and Amjad Khan (in a very minor role).

It follows a young boy in 1951 who travels to Delhi, wanting to meet Prime Minister Jawaharlal Nehru to seek justice for his father who has been wrongly sentenced to death.

== Cast ==
- Romi as Ratan
- Sulochana as Bela
- Motilal as Hariram
- Yakub as Ghaseeta
- Jagdeep as Maseeta
- Anwar Hussain as Mukundlal
- Amjad Khan as Lachhu
- Nand Kishore
- Baij Sharma
- C.S. Dubey as Ram Bharose
- Shivaji Rathore
- Om Prakash
- Manohar Gir
- Mohan Choti as Mithu
- Suraj Prakash
- Baby Chand as Shalu
- Pappu
- Ghanshyam (as Ghansham)
- Ram Kumar
- Chandan Mukherji
- Tillu
- Iftekhar as Inspector
- Hari Shivdasani as Prosecuting Lawyer
- Nana Palsikar as Defending Lawyer
- Bhudo Advani (as Budo Adwani)
- Bhupendra Kapoor as Guest Appearance (as Bhupendra Kapur)

== Music ==
The music for Ab Dilli Dur Nahin was composed by Dattaram, the lyrics penned by Shailendra and Hasrat Jaipuri, including the popular song "Chun Chun Karti Aayi Chidiya".

=== Soundtrack ===
1. "Mata O Mata Jo Tu Aaj Hoti" – Sudha Malhotra
2. "Yeh Chaman Hamara Apna Hai" – Asha Bhosle, Geeta Dutt
3. "Raghupati Raghav Raja Ram Ramleela" – Shamshad Begum, Geeta Dutt, Asha Bhosle
4. "Chun Chun Karati Aai Chidiyaa" – Mohammed Rafi
5. "Jiyo Lal Mere Tum Lakho Baras" – Lata Mangeshkar
6. "Bhej Chhana Chhan" – Mohammed Rafi, S. Balbir
7. "Lo Har Chiz Lelo Zamane Ke Logo" – Geeta Dutt, Asha Bhosle
8. "Malik Tere Jahan Mein" – Sudha Malhotra

The song "Yeh Chaman Hamara Apna Hai" is set in the Hindustani raga Kalyan.

== Release ==
The film premiered in 1957.

== See also ==
- Dilli Abhi Door Hai
