= Gur Sidhu discography =

Discography

- Studio albums: 3
- EPs: 2
- Soundtrack albums: 4
- Singles: 34
- Collaborative albums: 2
- As featured artist: 21
- As music producer: 243

Gur Sidhu is an Indian Punjabi singer-rapper and record producer, known for his contributions to Punjabi music and films. He has released three studio albums, two collaborative albums, four soundtrack albums, two extended play, 243 music productions and 33 singles.

== Albums ==
=== Studio albums ===
| Title | Album details | Writer(s) |
|---|---|---|
| Nothing Like Before | Released: 28 September 2021; Label: Brown Town Music; Producer: Nav Sandhu; Formats: CD, digital download, streaming | Gur Sidhu, Kaptaan, Jassa Dhillon, Jassi Lohka, Harman Binner, Kulshan Sandhu, Preet Cheema |
| Special Delivery | Released: 2 October 2023; Label: Brown Town Music; Formats: Digital download, streaming | Veet Baljit, Kaptaan, Nawab |
| Longway | Released: 23 July 2025; Label: Brown Town Music; Formats: Digital download, streaming | Kaptaan |
| Bonafide | Released: 12 February 2026; Label: Brown Town Music; Formats: Digital download, streaming | Cheema Y, Kaptaan, Preeta, Balkar, Nikeet Dhillon |

=== Collaborative albums ===
| Title | Album details | Peak chart positions |
| Title | Album details | NZ |
|---|---|---|
| Above All (with Jassa Dhillon) | Released: 21 March 2021; Label: Brown Town Music; Formats: Digital download, streaming | |
| Anyway (with Cheema Y) | Released: 30 January 2023; Label: Brown Town Music; Formats: Digital download, streaming | — |
| Young G.O.A.T. (with Cheema Y) | Released: 19 February 2025; Label: Brown Town Music; Formats: Digital download, streaming | 23 |
| The Simpsons (with Cheema Y) | Released: 11 October 2025; Label: Brown Town Music; Formats: Digital download, streaming | 19 |

== Extended plays ==
| Title | EP details |
|---|---|
| Love War (with Jassa Dhillon) | Released: 16 March 2022; Label: Brown Town Music; Format: Digital download, streaming |
| Step Up EP Vol 1 | Released: 11 August 2022; Label: Brown Town Music; Lyrics: Kaptaan; Producer: Nav Sandhu; Distribution: Believe Music; Format: Digital download, streaming |
| Dripster (with Cheema Y) | Released: 13 December 2023; Label: Brown Town Music; Format: Digital download, streaming |
| Cloud 9 (with Cheema Y) | Released: 8 May 2024; Label: Brown Town Music; Format: Digital download, streaming |

== Singles ==
=== As lead artist ===
| Title | Year | Lyrics | Peak chart position | | Record label | Album |
| Title | Year | Lyrics | UK Asian | UK Punjabi | Record label | Album |
|---|---|---|---|---|---|---|
| "Moved On" | 2019 | Gumnaam | — | — | Brown Town Music | |
| "Yaari" | 2019 | Jagga | — | — | Troll Punjabi | Yaar Jigree Kasooti Degree soundtrack |
| "Gal Dil Di" | 2019 | Jagga | — | — | White Hill Music | |
| "Bro Oye" (featuring Pardhaan) | 2019 | Kirat Gill | — | — | White Hill Music | |
| "Sham Da Laara" | 2020 | Jassa Dhillon | — | — | Brown Town Music | |
| "Fragrance" | 2020 | Preet Cheema | — | — | Brown Town Music | |
| "Jatt Hunne Aa" | 2020 | Kaptaan | — | — | Brown Town Music | |
| "Kaafla" (featuring Gurlez Akhtar) | 2020 | Jassa Dhillon | — | — | Brown Town Music | |
| "Oh Munde" | 2020 | Jassa Dhillon | — | — | Brown Town Music | |
| "Company" | 2020 | Babbu | — | — | Saga Music | |
| "Gang Life" (featuring Jassa Dhillon) | 2020 | Jassa Dhillon | — | — | Brown Town Music | |
| "Vaddi Gallbaat" | 2021 | Kulshan Sandhu | — | — | Brown Town Music | |
| "Sau Putt" | 2021 | Jassa Dhillon | — | — | Speed Records | |
| "Talja" (with Jassa Dhillon and Deepak Dhillon) | 2021 | Jassa Dhillon | 8 | 4 | | |
| "Gabru" | 2021 | Harman Binner | — | — | VIP Records | |
| "Yaarane" | 2021 | Jassa Dhillon | — | — | Brown Town Music | |
| "Jeep" | 2021 | Taaj Kang | — | — | | |
| "Yaraane" | 2021 | Jassa Dhillon | — | — | | |
| "Taakre" (with Jassa Dhillon) | 2021 | Jassa Dhillon | — | — | | Nothing Like Before |
| "Goli" (featuring Deepak Dhillon) | 2021 | Kulshan Sandhu | — | — | | Nothing Like Before |
| "Ashke Ashke" | 2021 | Kaptaan | — | — | | Nothing Like Before |
| "Dila Ve" | 2021 | Jassa Dhillon | — | — | | Nothing Like Before |
| "Dekhi Jau" | 2021 | Kaptaan | — | — | | Nothing Like Before |
| "Taara Tuttya" | 2021 | Jassi Lohka | — | — | | Nothing Like Before |
| "Bamb Aagya" (with Jasmine Sandlas) | 2022 | Kaptaan | 12 | 5 | | |
| "Compulsory" | 2022 | Kaptaan | — | — | | Step Up EP |
| "Gaddi" (with Gurlez Akhtar) | 2022 | Kaptaan | — | — | | Step Up EP |
| "Aho Aho" (featuring Sultaan) | 2022 | Kaptaan | — | — | | |
| "Pecha" (with Deepak Dhillon) | 2023 | Veet Baljit | — | — | | |
| "Routine" (with Jasmine Sandlas) | 2023 | Kaptaan | 27 | 18 | | |
| "Cool Cool" | 2023 | Kaptaan | — | — | | Special Delivery |
| "Anyway" (with Cheema Y) | 2023 | Cheema Y | — | — | Brown Town Music | Anyway |
| "California Love" (with Cheema Y) | 2023 | Cheema Y | 25 | 38 | Brown Town Music | Anyway |
| "Trump" (with Cheema Y) | 2024 | Cheema Y | 30 | — | Brown Town Music | |
| "Mutiyaar" | 2024 | Kaptaan | — | — | Brown Town Music | |
| "Punjab" | 2024 | Kaptaan | — | — | Brown Town Music | |
| "Moon Calling" (with Neha Kakkar) | 2025 | Kaptaan | — | — | Brown Town Music | |
| Snake (with Cheema Y) | 2025 | | 19 | | Brown Town Music | |
| Young GOAT (with Cheema Y) | 2025 | Cheema Y | 4 | | Brown Town Music | Young G.O.A.T. |
| Police (with Cheema Y & Gurlez Akhtar) | 2025 | Cheema Y | 7 | | Brown Town Music | Young G.O.A.T. |
| "Vancover" (with Cheema Y) | 2025 | Cheema Y | 21 | — | Brown Town Music | Young G.O.A.T. |
| "Avoid" (with Cheema Y) | 2025 | Cheema Y | — | — | Brown Town Music | Young G.O.A.T. |
| "DXB" (with Cheema Y) | 2025 | Cheema Y | 12 | | Brown Town Music | The Simpsons |
| "23" (with Cheema Y) | 2025 | Cheema Y | — | — | Brown Town Music | The Simpsons |

=== As featured artist ===
| Title | Year | Lyrics | Peak chart positions | | Record label | Album |
| Title | Year | Lyrics | IND | UK Asian | Record label | Album |
|---|---|---|---|---|---|---|
| "No Retake" (Aarsh Benipal feat. Gur Sidhu) | 2019 | Jagga | — | — | Brown Town Music | |
| "8 Parche" (Baani Sandhu featuring Gur Sidhu) | 2019 | Jassi Lohka | — | — | White Hill Music | |
| "Khrey Khrey Jatt" (Jass Bajwa feat. Gur Sidhu) | 2019 | Kaptaan | — | — | Desi Junction | |
| "Paapi Munda" (Mankirt Aulakh feat. Gur Sidhu) | 2020 | Kaptaan | — | — | Saga Hits | |
| "Jatt War" (Jai Bhullar feat. Gur Sidhu) | 2020 | Jai Gorya | — | — | Brown Town Music | |
| "Asle" (Gurman Sandhu feat. Gur Sidhu) | 2020 | Jassi Lohka | — | — | Brown Town Music | |
| "Bell Bottom" (Baani Sandhu feat. Gur Sidhu) | 2020 | Jassi Lohka | — | — | Desi Junction | |
| "Grandson" (Taaj King feat. Gur Sidhu) | 2020 | Taaj & Manak | — | — | Brown Town Music | |
| "Above All" (Jassa Dhillon feat. Gur Sidhu) | 2021 | Jassa Dhillon | — | — | Brown Town Music | Above All |
| "1 on 1" (Jassa Dhillon feat. Gur Sidhu) | 2021 | Jassa Dhillon | — | — | Brown Town Music | Above All |
| "Panga" (Gurman Sandhu feat. Gur Sidhu) | 2021 | Jassi Lohka | — | — | White Hill Music | |
| "Tere Bina" (Kulshan Sandhu feat. Gur Sidhu) | 2021 | Kulshan Sandhu | — | — | VIP Records | |
| "Majestic Laane" (Gurnam Bhullar feat. Gur Sidhu) | 2022 | Kaptaan | — | — | Desi Junction | Majestic Laane |
| "Zehar Lagde" (Bajwa feat. Gur Sidhu) | 2022 | Bajwa | — | — | Desi Junction | |
| "2 Number" (Jass Bajwa feat. Gur Sidhu) | 2022 | Kaptaan | — | — | Zora Studios | |
| "Life Goal" (Baani Sandhu feat. Gur Sidhu) | 2022 | Jassi Lohka | — | — | Desi Junction | The Boss Lady |
| "Theth Punjaban" (Baani Sandhu feat. Gur Sidhu) | 2022 | Jassa Dhillon | — | — | Desi Junction | The Boss Lady |
| "Taljo Madam Ji" (Sandhu Lahoriya feat. Gur Sidhu) | 2022 | Kaptaan | — | — | Flame Music | |

=== Soundtracks ===
| Film/Web Series | Year | Track | Lyrics | Music | Label | Notes |
|---|---|---|---|---|---|---|
| Yaar Jigree Kasooti Degree | 2019 | Yaari | Jagga | Gur Sidhu | Troll Punjabi | Web Series |
| Ardab Mutiyaran | 2019 | Challa (with Harpi Gill) | Gur Sidhu | Gur Sidhu | White Hill Music | Film |
| Shareek 2 | 2022 | Bang Bang (with Jassa Dhillon) | Jassa Dhillon | Gur Sidhu | White Hill Music | Film |
| Yaar Challe Bahar | 2022 | Yaar Challe Bahar - Titile Song | Gurdas Sandhu | Gur Sidhu | Troll Punjabi | Web Series |

== Production discography ==
=== Singles ===
list of singles credited as record producer
| Title | Year | Artist(s) | Record label | Album |
|---|---|---|---|---|
| Tralle | 2019 | Anmol Gagan Maan | Saga Hits | |
| Agg | 2019 | Himanshi Khurana | Himanshi Khurana Music | |
| Yaar Mere | 2019 | Aarsh Benipal | Saaz Records | |
| Luqior Store | 2019 | Deep Shergill | Times Music | |
| Debate | 2019 | Deep Shergill | Times Music | |
| Pyar Bolda | 2019 | Jassa Dhillon | Brown Town Music | |
| Jhanjar | 2019 | Jassa Dhillon | Brown Town Music | |
| Punjaban | 2019 | Baani Sandhu | Brown Town Music | |
| Gunman | 2019 | Garry Atwal | Aish Audio | |
| Chardikala | 2019 | Gora Chak Wala | Brown Town Music | |
| Top Di Gaddi | 2019 | Amrit Virk | White Hill Music | |
| Jimidar Gabru | 2020 | Jass Bajwa | Hey Yolo | Aah Chak 2020 |
| Regret | 2020 | R Nait | Speed Records | |
| Taare | 2020 | Harlal Baath and Sidhu Moose Wala | Sony Music India | |
| Subah Jatt Da | 2020 | Amrit Maan and Gurlez Akhtar | Bamb Beats | |
| Manke | 2020 | Jassa Dhillon | Brown Town Music | |
| Jatt Rule | 2020 | Aarsh Benipal and Gurlez Akhtar | Swagger Music | |
| Raje Jatt | 2020 | Jagga Bajwa | Jass Records | |
| When I Am Gone | 2020 | Sidhu Moose Wala | Sidhu Moose Wala | Snitches Get Stitches |
| Faraar | 2020 | Jassa Dhillon | Brown Town Music | |
| Chote Chote Ghar | 2020 | Ranjit Bawa | Nupur Audio | |
| Jatt Jaffe | 2020 | Jassa Dhillon and Gurlez | Brown Town Music | |
| Jhanjar | 2020 | AKM Singh | Jass Records | |
| Jatt Tenu Saunh | 2020 | Amrit Singh | White Hill Music | |
| Tere Te Si Mardi | 2020 | Harsimran | T-Series | |
| Black On Black | 2020 | Harman Binner | White Hill Music | |
| Poppy Seed | 2020 | Love Dhillon & Deepak Dhillon | Single Track Studios | |
| Ghadi Teri | 2020 | Raman Gill | Speed Records | |
| Yaar Puchde | 2020 | Kamal Khaira | Desi Junction | |
| Mitha Mitha | 2020 | Jaskaran Riar | Jass Records | |
| Hathan Vich Hath | 2020 | Gurpinder Panag | Jass Records | |
| Debate | 2020 | Amar Sehmbi | Jass Records | |
| Mutiyaare Ni | 2020 | Jassa Dhillon feat. Bohemia | Yash Raj Films | |
| Eddan Ni | 2020 | Amrit Maan feat. Bohemia | Bang Music | |
| Jitange Jarur | 2021 | Veet Baljit | G Hawk Studios | |
| Pyaar Hogya | 2021 | Jassa Dhillon | Brown Town Music | |
| Dilbar | 2021 | Khan Bhaini | Single Track Studios | |
| Same Here | 2021 | Sunny Kahlon, G Noor | T-Series (company) | |
| All Tracks | 2021 | Jassa Dhillon, Gurlez Akhtar | Brown Town Music | Above All |
| All Tracks | 2021 | Jassa Dhillon, Gur Sidhu | Brown Town Music | Above All |
| Agg Att Koka Kehar | 2021 | Baani Sandhu, Gurnam Bhullar | Desi Junction | |
| Bhabhi | 2021 | Kamal Khaira | Desi Junction | |
| Pistol | 2021 | Baani Sandhu, Jassa Dhillon | Desi Junction | |
| Laare | 2021 | Naaz Aulakh, Singga | Desi Junction | |
| Timeless | 2021 | Raavi Gill | Brown Town Music | |
| Hush | 2021 | Gursim Singh | Chakk 22 Entertainment | |
| Jatti Teri Fan | 2021 | Gurman Sandhu, Gurlez Akhtar | Desi Junction | |
| Bandook | 2021 | Arjun Majitha, Gurlez Akhtar | Brown Town Music | |
| 7 Mann | 2021 | Kaafar Kang, Gurlej Akhtar | Western Vibes | |
| Badmashi | 2021 | Kulshan Sandhu, Gurlez Akhtar | VIP Records | |
| Hobby | 2021 | Sukhman Heer | Swagger Studio | |
| Kardi Aa Worry | 2021 | Sahaz | T-Series Apna Punjab | |
| Timeless | 2021 | Raavi Gill | Brown Town Music | |
| Cadillac | 2021 | Shubh Goraya | Aim Music Records | |
| Think About It | 2021 | Harvi Harinder | Beat Gang Music | |
| Morni | 2021 | Jimmy Kaler, Gurlez Akhtar | Crown Records | |
| Counter Attack | 2021 | Jaskaran Riar, Gurlez Akhtar | Jass Records | |
| Rough Tone | 2021 | Dilbag Sandhu, Gurlez Akhtar | Turn Music | |
| Bahaan Teriyan | 2021 | Kulshan Sandhu | VIP Records | |
| Diamond Koka | 2022 | Gurnam Bhullar | Desi Junction | Majestic Lane |
| Majestic Lane; Shoulder; Empty; Bhabi | 2022 | Gurnam Bhullar | Desi Junction | Majestic Lane |
| Dil Te Dimaag? | 2022 | Manna Datte Aala | Brown Town Music | |
| Rajdhani | 2022 | Gulab Sidhu, Gurlez Akhtar | Leaf Records | |
| Lakeer | 2022 | Raavi Gill | Brown Town Music | |
| Jatt Ohi Ae | 2022 | Amar Sehmbi, Gurlez Akhtar | Jass Records | |
| Menace | 2022 | Deep Dhaliwal | Tking Records | |
| Living Stlye | 2022 | Love Dhillon | Love Dhillon Music | |
| Akh Da Taara | 2022 | Kaash | Ranokx Entertainments | |
| Theek Chal Da | 2022 | Love Dhillon | 47 Records | |
| Wrong Route | 2022 | Lambadar, Gurlez Akhtar | Wrangler Productions | |
| Phone Na Katti | 2022 | Abhi Lahoria | Fam Studioz | |
| Bad Jatt | 2022 | Cali Jass | Boss Life Studios | |
| Saau Chobbar | 2022 | Shahjeet Bal, Deepak Dhillon | Jivi Records | |
| Pistol | 2022 | Sabar Sandhu, Gurlez Akhtar | Sabar Sandhu Music | |
| Jhanjar | 2022 | Baani Sandhu | Desi Junction | The Boss Lady |
| Life Long; Theth Punjaban; Chacha Deputy; Engagement; Tenu Ki | 2022 | Baani Sandhu | Desi Junction | The Boss Lady |
| Ford Jatt | 2022 | Jimmy Kaler, Deepak Dhillon | Jimmy Kaler Music | |
| Example | 2022 | Gurnam Bhullar | DiamondStar Worldwide | |
| Dekhya Kite | 2022 | Davvy, Simar Kaur | Brown Town Music | |
| Time Kadh Ke | 2022 | Arjun Majitha ft. Neha Jethwani | Brown Town Music | |
| Nikli Koi Gal | 2022 | Ranjit Bawa | T-Series (company) | |
| Chal Payi Chal Payi | 2022 | R Nait, Gurlez Akhtar | R Nait Music | |
| Winnipeg | 2022 | Deep Dhillon, Gurlez Akhtar | Brown Town Music | |
| Ailaan | 2022 | Gulab Sidhu, Gurlez Akhtar | Leaf Records | |
