= Sardaar Ji 3 =

2025 Indian film by Amar Hundal

- Theatrical release poster
- Directed by: Amar Hundal
- Written by: Dheeraj Rattan; Manila Rattan
- Produced by: Gunbir Singh Sidhu; Manmord Sidhu; Diljit Dosanjh
- Starring: Diljit Dosanjh; Hania Aamir; Neeru Bajwa; Jasmin Bajwa; Sapna Pabbi; Manav Vij; Gulshan Grover
- Cinematography: Baljit Singh Deo
- Edited by: Gurjeet Hundal
- Music by: MixSingh
- Production companies: White Hill Studios; Story Time Productions
- Distributed by: White Hill Studios
- Release date: 27 June 2025
- Running time: 134 minutes
- Country: India
- Language: Punjabi
- Budget: ₹35 crore
- Box office: ₹70.10 crore

Sardaar Ji 3 is a 2025 Indian Punjabi-language, horror-comedy film directed by Amar Hundal and produced by Gunbir Singh Sidhu, Manmord Sidhu, and Diljit Dosanjh under White Hill Studios and Story Time Productions. It is the third installment in the Sardaar Ji film series, succeeding Sardaar Ji and Sardaar Ji 2, and stars Diljit Dosanjh, Hania Aamir, Neeru Bajwa, Jasmin Bajwa, Gulshan Grover, Sapna Pabbi and Manav Vij in supporting roles.

The film released on 27 June 2025, excluding Indian theatres due to political tensions between India and Pakistan.

The film emerged as a hit and became the fifth highest-grossing Punjabi film of all-time and highest-grossing Punjabi film of all time in overseas, surpassing another Diljit Dosanjh starrer, the trequel Jatt & Juliet 3 (2024). It is currently the highest-grossing Punjabi film of the year and the second-highest-grossing film overall in the history of Pakistan after The Legend Of Maula Jatt.

== Cast ==
- Diljit Dosanjh as Jaggi
- Hania Amir as Noor
- Neeru Bajwa as Rani Churail aka Pinky
- Jasmin Bajwa as IT Churail
- Sapna Pabbi as Monica
- Manav Vij as KK and JK
- Gulshan Grover as Kala Lahoriya
- Monica Sharma
- Nasir Chinyoti as TT
- B.N. Sharma as Jaggi's master/teacher
- DJ Henaary
- DJ Fluke

== Music ==
The music for Sardaar Ji 3 features lyrics by Zafar Sandhu, Jaani, and Happy Raikoti, with vocals by Diljit Dosanjh, Jasmeen Akhtar and music by MixSingh, Bunny. The soundtrack was released by White Hill Music on 20 June 2025 and includes six tracks.

=== Track listing ===
No.	Title	Lyrics	Music	Singer(s)	Length
1.	"Sohni Lagdi"	Zafar Sandhu	MixSingh	Diljit Dosanjh	2:35
2.	"Sardaar Ji 3 Title Track"	Zafar Sandhu	MixSingh	Diljit Dosanjh	2:27
3.	"Pasoorian"	Happy Raikoti	MixSingh	Diljit Dosanjh	2:39
4.	"Chill Mardi"	Jaani	Bunny	Diljit Dosanjh	2:50
5.	"Daaru Mukgi"	Zafar Sandhu	MixSingh	Diljit Dosanjh, Jasmeen Akhtar	2:42
6.	"Bahana"	Zafar Sandhu	MixSingh	Diljit Dosanjh	1:59
Total length:					15:12

== Production ==
The film Sardaar Ji 3 was officially announced in July 2024 by Diljit Dosanjh, alongside producers Gunbir Singh Sidhu and Manmord Sidhu of White Hill Studios, in collaboration with Story Time Productions. It is directed by Amar Hundal and continues the horror‑comedy style of the franchise. Filming began in late 2024, with principal photography taking place in Punjab, India, followed by an international schedule in the United Kingdom. Diljit shared behind-the-scenes photos from the UK set in June 2025, showing scenes with Neeru Bajwa and hinting at upcoming ghostly and romantic sequences.

The film marks the first collaboration between Diljit Dosanjh and Pakistani actress Hania Aamir. Initial social media teasers sparked speculation, as fans spotted Hania in several BTS images. Her involvement was later confirmed in the official teaser trailer, released on 22 June 2025, which presented a humorous yet eerie tone and announced a 27 June 2025 global release. Though the film premiered internationally, it was not released in Indian cinemas because of ongoing political tensions between Pakistan and India, and objections from the Federation of Western India Cine Employees (FWICE).

== Release ==
The film was theatrically released on 27 June 2025, targeting Punjabi speaking audiences in overseas markets mainly in Australia, Canada, Middle East, North America, Pakistan etc. It was not released in the domestic market of India, in response to political tensions and industry calls, including requests from the Federation of Western India Cine Employees (FWICE) to deny certification for films featuring Pakistani actors.

== Reception ==
Muttahir Ahmed Khan of The Express Tribune said that “However, despite the fresh setting, the storyline remains structurally similar to the earlier installments, leaning heavily on familiar tropes — bumbling heroes, exaggerated and even comic villains, and a chaotic narrative full of comic misunderstandings.”

== Controversy ==
In April 2025, following a terror attack in Pahalgam that worsened India–Pakistan relations, FWICE demanded a ban on Pakistani artists appearing in Indian films. This led to widespread speculation that Hania Aamir was removed from Sardaar Ji 3, though the production team did not confirm these reports. Diljit Dosanjh’s release of a new poster of the film with Hania's image further fueled debate. The film's trailer further confirmed the casting of the Pakistani actress Hania Amir. In a rare move, the makers decided to release the film overseas but not in India. The film emerged as a major box office success.

== See also ==
- List of Punjabi films of 2025
