= List of Punjabi films of 2014 =

This is a list of Punjabi films of 2014.

== List of films ==
Title	Director	Cast	Genre	Release date	Producer	Ref.
Bade Changey Ne Mere Yaar Kaminey	Munish Sharma	Karan Kundra, Inderjit Nikku, Gaurav Kakkar, Sonia Mann, Isha Rikki, Kajal Jatin	Comedy	3 January 2014	Kapil Batra Production, Kapil Batra, Rajan Batra, Talwinder Singh Vicky	
Patiala Dreamz	Abhishek Saxena	Sarwar Ahuja, Madalsa Sharma, B.N. Sharma, Sardar Sohi, Rana Jang Bahadur, Maninder Velli, Usha Bachani	Drama, comedy, action	10 January 2014	Kapoor Films, Showbiz, Anmol Kapoor, Parminder Kapoor	
Veeran Naal Sardari	Harinder Gill	Rai Jujhar, Jaspinder Cheema, Sapna Thakur, Harry Ahluwalia, Armaan Kagra, Gurchet Chitrakar, Sukhbir Razia	Drama, romance, action	17 January 2014	Wild Rose Films, Bharat Bhushan Madaan, Preetpal Shergill	
YDYP Assi Haan Yaar Punjabi	Chander Aggarwal	Harpaal Josan, Manjit Rupowalia, Kamaljeet Kaur, Anamika, Surinder Sharma, Bhotu Shah	Drama	31 January 2014	Friends Star Films, Jagjeet Singh, Parveen Kumar, Amarjeet Singh, Vikas Goswami	
Kirpaan: The Sword of Honour	Amrik Gill	Roshan Prince, Gurleen Chopra, Samiksha Singh, Kulbhushan Kharbanda, Sunita Dhir, Shavender Mahal, Jatinder Bhardwaj, Harry Josh	Drama	7 February 2014	Rabaab Records Pvt. Ltd., Rajinder Pal Singh Banwait	
Ishq Brandy	Amit Prasher	Roshan Prince, Alfaaz, Japji Khaira, Wamiqa Gabbi, Binnu Dhillon, B.N. Sharma, Shivendra Mahal, Karamjit Anmol	Romance, comedy	21 February 2014	Future Cine Vision; Mahesh Garg, Satish Aggarwal, Randhir Singh Dheera, Dimple Mittal, Baboo Mittal	
Fateh	Jaspreet Rajan	Nav Bajwa, Samiksha Singh, Yaad Grewal, Puneet Issar, Deep Dhillon, Shivendra Mahal, Navneet Nishan, Gurpreet Ghuggi, Karamjit Anmol, Supreet Bedi, Sunita Dhir, Dr Ranjit, Jatinder Sharma	Action, drama, comedy	7 March 2014	Big Vision Films Pvt Ltd, Jyotdeep Singh, Munjan Preet Singh	
Kaum De Heere	Ravinder Ravi	Raj Kakra	Drama, crime	14 March 2014 (overseas market; banned in India)	Parminder Takhar, Kanwaljit Singh, Sukhpal Mann	
Mr & Mrs 420	Ksshitij Chaudhary	Yuvraj Hans, Jassi Gill, Babbal Rai, Shruti Sodhi, Avantika Hundal, Swati Kapoor, Jaswinder Bhalla, Binnu Dhillon, Vijay Tandon, Mani Boparai, Hardeep Gill, Kuldeep Sharma	Comedy	14 March 2014	Friday Rishh Motion Pictures, Rupali Gulati	
Marriage da garriage	Jaswinder Singh	Navraj Hans, Keeya Khanna, Jaswinder Bhalla, B N Sharma, Upasna Singh, Shakti Kapoor, Rana Jung Bahadur, Razak Khan	Comedy	28 March 2014	30ty Productions	
Inquilab 2013	Gaurav Sharma	Rajinder Singh Marshal, Jazzy Lahoria, Manreet Kaur	Action	4 April 2014	Sir Marshal Films	
Proud To Be A Sikh	Satdeep Singh, Dr. Rupinder Singh	Amritpal Singh, Satish Kaul, Harvinder Singh, Rakinder Kaur, Harkirat Singh, Prince Chibuisieze, Tarlochan Singh, Gurkaran Singh, Pansy Dhawan, Sifat Sidhu, Shubh Goyal, Gaurav Gaba, Satpal Singh, Atinder Singh, Amrinder Singh, Jaspreet Singh Rehan, Jaskaran Singh and Padamvir Singh Syan	Drama, romance	4 April 2014	Shan E Khalsa	
Disco Singh	Anurag Singh	Diljit Dosanjh, Surveen Chawla	Romantic comedy	11 April 2014	PTC Motion Pictures, Rajiee M. Shinde, Rabindra Narayanan	
Jatt James Bond	Rohit Jugraj	Gippy Grewal, Zarine Khan, Rahul Dev, Yashpal Sharma, Gurpreet Ghuggi, Vindu Dara Singh, Mukesh Rishi, Sardar Sohi	Romance, action	25 April 2014	Fortune House Productions Inc	
Dil Vil Pyaar Vyaar	Manjeet Mann	Gurdas Mann, Neeru Bajwa, Jassi Gill, Manav Vij, Raj Jhinger, Meher Vij, Khushdeed Maan, Shruti Sodhi, Rajiv Thakur	Family, drama	2 May 2014	Sai Productions	
Myself Ghaint	Akashdeep S Batth	Gaurav Kakkar, Dolly Sidhu, Maninder Velly, Aditi Govitrikar, Brownie Prashar, Banny Chauhan	Comedy	9 May 2014	United Space Productions, Silver Hawk Productions	
Romeo Ranjha	Navaniat Singh	Jazzy B, Garry Sandhu, Parul Gulati	Action, comedy	16 May 2014	White Hill Production, Speed Surya Films, Gunbir Singh Sidhu, Manmord Sidhu	
47 to 84 Hun Main Kisnu Watan Kahunga	Rajiv Sharma	Natasha Rana, Zafar Dhillon	Drama, historical	30 May 2014	Shemaroo Entertainment Limited, Babli Singh	
Mundeyan Ton Bachke Rahin	Navinder Kirpal Singh	Roshan Prince, Jassi Gill, Simran Kaur Mundi, Sunny Gill, Bharti Singh, Anshu Sawhney, Minto, Hobby Dhaliwal, Sunita Dhir, Manoj Sabharwal	Romantic comedy	30 May 2014	Aum Moviez, Gill Pictures Entertainment, Pawan Gill, Aman Gill, Arun Mehra	
Arsho	Shapinder Pal Singh	Mannat Singh, Dakssh Ajit Singh, Sonia Gill, Shakti Anand	Romance	13 June 2014	Tasbee Muzic, Wisdom Tree Pictures Private Limited, Dakssh Ajit Singh	
Tu Kii Jaane Sajjna	Deepak Salghotra (DK)	Abhay Dheeraj Singh, Supriya Chauhan, Tavleen Kaur	Romance, drama	13 June 2014	Jai Maa Productions, Ram Dhan Dhiman	
Punjab 1984	Anurag Singh	Diljit Dosanjh, Sonam Bajwa, Kirron Kher, Pawan Malhotra, Arun Bali, Rana Ranbir, Manav Vij, Vishwas Kini, Vansh Bhardwaj, G.S. Channi	Drama, family	27 June 2014	White Hill Basic Brothers Entertainment, Gunbir Singh Sidhu, Manmord Sidhu	
Ho Javey Je Pyaar	Shirin Anandita	Feroz Kaur Heer, Zorawar Singh, Bhotu Shah, Anita Meet, Surender Sharma, Parminder Gill	Romance	11 July 2014	Celionce Films Pvt Ltd	
Yaaran Da Katchup	Abhey Baiju Chabbra	Mehar Mittal, Jaswinder Bhalla, B.N. Sharma, Rana Ranbir, Anita Hassanandani, Yuvika Chaudhary, Manreet Kaur, Shagun Jaswal, Varun Sharma, Hardy Sandhu	Romantic comedy	18 July 2014	Vikram Bansal	
Pher Chalo School Ji Oh My Pyo Ji	Niharika Sahni, Rai Yuvraj Singh	Babbal Rai, Binnu Dhillon, Jaswinder Bhalla, Bhanushree Mehra, Sardar Sohi, Dakshita Kumaria	Comedy	25 July 2014	Niharika Sahni Productions	
Paisa Yaar N Panga	Virender Singh	Gavie Chahal, Mukul Dev, Kushboo Grewal, Flora Saini, Karan Sekhon, Rishita Monga, Veer Vashisht	Comedy	1 August 2014	Blockbuster Motion Pictures	
Aa Gaye Munde U.K. De	Manmohan Singh	Jimmy Shergill, Neeru Bajwa, Om Puri, Gurpreet Ghuggi		8 August 2014	Sunny Trehan, Trehan Productions	
Control Bhaji Control	Gaurav Singh	Karan Kundra, Sangram Singh, B.N. Sharma, Upasna Singh, Rana Jung Bahadur, Savita Bhatti, Bhottu Shah, Kake Shah, Harpal Singh, Nachattar Gill	Comedy	22 August 2014	Real World Entertainment	
Double Di Trouble	Smeep Kang	Dharmendra, Gippy Grewal, Poonam Dhillon, Rana Ranbir, Mannisha Lamba, Kulraj Randhawa, Gurpreet Ghuggi	Comedy	29 August 2014	Mukta Arts Entertainment, Subhash Ghai, Ashok Ghai	
Goreyan Nu Daffa Karo	Pankaj Batra	Amrinder Gill, Amrit Maghera, Binnu Dhillon, Rana Ranbir, Yograj Singh, Sardar Sohi, Karamjit Anmol, Aman Khatkar	Comedy	12 September 2014	Speed Records, Rhythm Boyz, Suresh Kumar, Monty Shoor, Sukhjinder Bhachu, Aman Khatkar	
Idiot Boys	Anand Nirola	Meet Surmeet, Rammi Mittal, Diljott, Rama Vij, Darshan Aulakh, Kake Shah, Amritpal Chotu	Drama	26 September 2014	Captab Entertainments, Yashraj Mittal Films	
Police in Pollywood Balle Balle	Sunita Dhir	Anuj Sachdev, Mani Kapoor, Sunita Dhir, Anuj Sachdeva, Bhagwant Mann, Raj Brar, Sardool Sikander, Parmod Mautho, Baljinder Singh Atwal, Preeto, Surinder Bath, Anita Meet, Jagdeep Jaggi, Raghveer Bali	Comedy, drama, romance	10 October 2014	Gautam Productions	
Yoddha The Warrior	Mandeep Benipal	Kuljinder Singh Sidhu, Rahul Dev, Girija Shankar, Unnati Dawara	Drama	31 October 2014	OXL Films	
Chaar Sahibzaade	Harry Baweja		3D animation film	6 November 2014	Baweja Movies Pvt. Ltd	
Baaz	Simerjit Singh	Babbu Maan, Pooja Verma, Aditi Sharma, Mukul Dev, Sardar Sohi, Rana Ranbir	Action, drama	14 November 2014	Maan Films s, Babbu Maan	
Dilli 1984	Ashok Gupta	Gugu Gill, Rama Vij, Gurdeep Mehndi, Jessica Singh, Preet Bal, Seema Kullar, Jazzy Lahoria, Nirmal Rishi, Anita Meet, Malkeet Rauni		14 November 2014 (overseas market only; banned in India)	Subhash Gupta	
Happy Go Lucky	Amarpreet G S Chhabra (Prince)	Amrinder Gill, Harish Verma, Sumeet Sandhu, Gurpreet Ghuggi, B N Sharma, Praneet Bhatt, Kuldeep Sharma, Parminder Gill	Comedy	21 November 2014	Baweja Films Pvt Ltd, Harry Baweja	
Proper Patola	Harish Vyas	Neeru Bajwa, Harish Verma, Yuvraj Hans	Romantic comedy	28 November 2014	Country Media PVT LTD	
Pyaar Na Manne Haar	Pappu Sharma	Hasan Ali Khan, Komal Dhillon	Romance	28 November 2014	SC Film Production	
Cross Connection	Nishant Bhardwaj	Gary Waraich, Nancy Johal, B.N. Sharma, Upasna Singh, Gurchet Chitrakaar, Baagi Bhangu, Sumandeep Kaur, Tarsem Paul, Dr. Sahib Singh, Jasbir Dhillon, Anita Sabdeesh, Raman Dhillon, Rajinder Rozy, Dilawar Sidhu, Prakash Gadhu, Malkeet Rouni, Gulu Ji, Krishan Joshi, Neer, Jelly Jarnail	Comedy	26 December 2014	Jasbir Dhillon (Dhillon Creations Mohali Chd.)	
