= Super Singh =

2017 film directed by Anurag Singh

- Directed by: Anurag Singh
- Written by: Anurag Singh
- Screenplay by: Dheeraj Rattan; Anurag Singh
- Produced by: Shobha Kapoor; Ekta Kapoor; Anurag Singh; Pawan Gill; Aman Gill
- Starring: Diljit Dosanjh; Sonam Bajwa; Pavan Malhotra
- Cinematography: Anshul Chobey
- Edited by: Manish More
- Music by: Jatinder Shah
- Production companies: Balaji Motion Pictures; Brat Films
- Release date: 16 June 2017
- Running time: 155 minutes
- Language: Punjabi/Hindi

Super Singh is a 2017 Indian Punjabi-language superhero action comedy film written and directed by Anurag Singh. It has main starrings of actors Diljit Dosanjh, Sonam Bajwa and Alexandra Bandean. The film is a mix of comedy and action. It was filmed in Montreal, Canada, and in India. Super Singh was released worldwide on 16 June 2017. It marked the fifth collaboration between Diljit Dosanjh and director Anurag Singh.

== Plot ==
Sajjan Singh (Diljit Dosanjh), a Punjabi man resides in Canada with his mother. Circumstances bring him back to his hometown in Punjab, where he accidentally attains superpowers and sets off on a path of self realisation.

Initially, in Canada, Sajjan is a spoilt guy who only wanted to seek pleasure and wants to impress his love (a girl from Canada) but is secretly loved by his childhood friend. When her mother comes to Canada, she accidentally exchanges Sajjan's turban with a guy trying to escape death. Sajjan, who renamed himself Sam just to mix with foreigners, tries to impress Cathy through a game of rugby but is feared that he will be beaten up by her boyfriend in the game. Not realizing it first, he strangely beats them and finds that he has got some super powers.

After days of trying to find out the cause of his power, he realises that a turban was the cause of his power, when he was going to cut his hair for Cathy. He then decided to stop thinking of Cathy as she finds his culture inferior and helps others to realise all who Singh's are and thus becomes Super Singh. After many incidents and struggles, he defeats a fake guru, the Dass and saves Shree Darbar Sahib from a missile fired by Dass. Then after saving the day, he meets a fake looking web slinger and gossips with him a lot and finds out that it was an actor (played by Sharry Mann himself) who was just acting out for some reasons.

== Cast ==
- Diljit Dosanjh as Sajjan Singh/ Sam/ Super Singh
- Sonam Bajwa as Twinkle
- Pavan Malhotra as Saint
- Rana Ranbir
- Alexandra Bandean as Cathy
- Meherban Singh
- Navnindra Behl
- Alexandre Brassard
- Survinder Vicky
- Sharry Mann, guest appearance as Spider-Man

== Development ==
According to Diljit Dosanjh, the idea to make a Punjabi superhero film came to him after the release of Jatt and Juliet in the year 2012 when he saw an image of himself superimposed on the body of Superman by someone on the internet. Due to the expensive budget of the film, it took Diljit and Anurag Singh, the director of the film, nearly two years to find a Producer for the movie. It was only after Ekta Kapoor's Balaji Motion Pictures came on board as a Producer was this project given the green light. Super Singh marks the fifth collaboration of actor Diljit Dosanjh and director Anurag Singh after Jatt & Juliet, Jatt & Juliet 2, Punjab 1984 and Disco Singh, and is the maiden Punjabi production of Ekta Kapoor. The first look of the film was unveiled by Balaji Motion Pictures on 17 January 2017.

== Soundtrack ==
Super Singh

Soundtrack album by Jatinder Shah
- Released: 5 June 2017
- Genre: Feature film soundtrack
- Length: 14:50
- Label: Zee Music Company

The soundtrack of Super Singh was composed by Jatinder Shah. The lyrics were written by Ranbir Singh & Veet Baljit.

No.	Title	Lyrics	Music	Singer(s)	Length
1.	"Hawa Vich"	Ranbir Singh	Jatinder Shah	Diljit Dosanjh & Sunidhi Chauhan	03:50
2.	"Kalliyan Kulliyan"	Veet Baljit	Jatinder Shah	Diljit Dosanjh	03:24
3.	"Ho Gaya Talli"	Veet Baljit	Jatinder Shah	Diljit Dosanjh	02:11
4.	"Glorious Gallan"	Ranbir Singh	Jatinder Shah	Diljit Dosanjh	03:03
5.	"Super Singh Ji Aaye Aa"	Ranbir Singh	Jatinder Shah	Traditional Singers	02:26
Total length:					14:50

== Reception ==
=== Box office ===
The film opened at around 1100 screens worldwide. Widest for a Punjabi film. It was released alongside Cars 3 (in India) and Bank Chor.

=== Critical reception ===
Divya Pal of News18 praised the performance of Diljit Dosanjh, giving it a rating of 2.5 stars out of 5 and saying, "Director Singh deserves credit for thinking different, aiming high to surprise viewers, but this time out, it doesn't quite come together. The reason? There is no freshness in the script. All in all, predictable plot and safe script, dilutes the impact of the film." Manjusha Radhakrishnan of Gulf News gave the film a rating of 2 stars out of 5, and said, "While it's sweet at first, it gets cloyingly virtuous toward the second half. A predictable story line and stereotypical villains make it a tedious watch." The Hindustan Times gave the film a rating of 2 stars out of 5, saying, "Diljit comes across as somewhat anxious in his efforts to woo audiences in his new avatar. The performance lacks the effortlessness of Udta Punjab. The special effects are cringe-worthy, and when Diljit flies, he looks like Ashok Kumar marching across the army base in a comatose condition in Manoj Kumar's Clerk." Jyoti Sharma Bawa of The Indian Express praised the humour of the film saying, "Diljit Dosanjh film is a goofball comedy and a superhero caper all rolled into one. What it lacks in script and CGI, it more than makes up in jokes and Diljit's easy charm." and gave the film a rating of 3 stars out of 5.
