= Anugrah Bohrey =

Indian screenwriter

- Born: New Delhi
- Occupation: Film-maker

Anugrah Bohrey is a Canada-based Indian Filmmaker. He started his film career with White Hill Production Inc. as a screenwriter for Best of Luck (2013). He is currently involved with producing a sport-based film, Himmat Singh. He is an alumnus of Vancouver Film School and London Film School.

== Career ==
Bohrey worked as an assistant director on Jatt and Juliet before his writing assignment with White Hill Production Inc. in 2011. He also worked as an assistant director in Jatt and Juliet 2. Apart from Best of Luck (2013) and Himmat Singh, Bohrey is scripting a Bollywood project.

== Select filmography ==
Year	Film	Role(s)
2014	Untitled Bollywood Film	Writer, Director
2013	Himmat Singh	Writer, Assistant Director
2013	Best of Luck (2013)	Writer
2013	Jatt and Juliet 2	Assistant Director
2013	Singh vs Kaur	Production Assistant (2nd Schedule)
2012	Jatt and Juliet	Assistant Director

Year	Film	Role(s)
2015	Shumshaan Voraag	Director of Photography
2014	Last Night of a Dying fair	Director of Photography
2013	The Passage	Assistant Cinematographer
