= Jind Mahi =

2022 Indian Punjabi-language romantic drama film

- Official poster
- Directed by: Sameer Pannu
- Screenplay by: Manmord Sidhu Sameer Pannu Jatinder Lall
- Story by: Manmord Sidhu Sameer Pannu
- Produced by: Gunbir Singh Sidhu Manmord Sidhu
- Starring: Sonam Bajwa Ajay Sarkaria
- Cinematography: Ravi Kumar Sana
- Production company: White Hill Studios
- Release date: 5 August 2022
- Running time: 130 Minutes
- Country: India
- Language: Punjabi

Jind Mahi is a 2022 Indian Punjabi-language romantic drama film, starring Sonam Bajwa and Ajay Sarkaria. Directed by Sameer Pannu, this film has been produced under White Hill Studios and was earlier scheduled to be released in the theatres on 8 July 2022. The film was eventually released on 5 August 2022.

== Cast ==
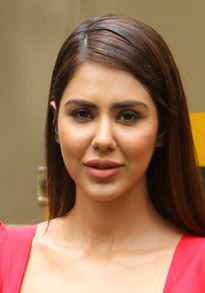
Sonam Bajwa is the lead actress of the film.

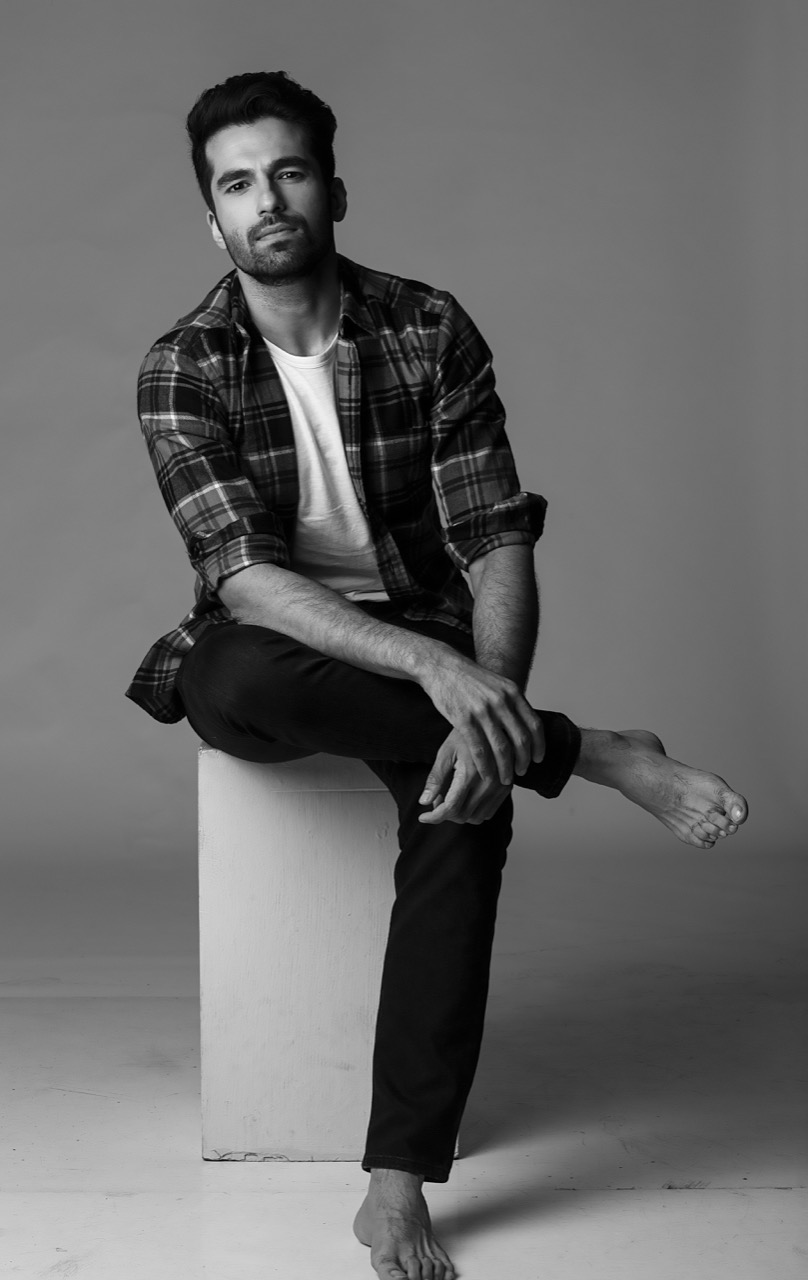
This marks Ajay Sarkaria's second film after Ardab Mutiyaran.

- Sonam Bajwa as Lakhwinder Kaur "Laddo"
- Ajay Sarkaria as Har Narayan "Harry"
- Raj Shoker as Sabreen
- Sukhwinder Chahal as Harry's grandfather
- Samreen Kaur
- Shavinder Mahal as Rajinder: Harry's father
- Baninder Bunny as Balli: Harry's friend
- Gurnam Bhullar as Pinder Maan (Guest Appearance)
- Ginni Kapoor (Guest Appearance)
- Harman Dhaliwal (Guest Appearance)

== Production ==
The film was announced in August 2021 after the success of lead pair's 2019 film Ardab Mutiyaran, with the same pair Sonam Bajwa and Ajay Sarkaria. Thus this is the second project where Sonam and Ajay will be seen together on screen. Raj Shoker, from Udaarian song fame is all set to make her acting debut with the film.

Principal photography for the film commenced in September 2021.

== Soundtrack ==
Jind Mahi

Soundtrack album by Desi Crew, Goldboy & Oye Kunaal
- Released: 2022
- Genre: Feature film soundtrack
- Language: Punjabi
- Label: White Hill Music

=== Track list of Jind Mahi ===
No.	Title	Lyrics	Music	Singer(s)	Length
1.	"Rabba Mainu"	Farmaan	Oye Kunaal	Gurnam Bhullar	3:21
2.	"Shiddat"	Youngveer	Goldboy	Gurnam Bhullar	3:08
3.	"Baahn Fadke"	Mandeep Mavi	Desi Crew	Dilpreet Dhillon; Gurlez Akhtar	3:12
4.	"Jind Mahi Title Track"	Raahi	Oye Kunaal	Oye Kunaal	3:06
5.	"Sada De Layi"	Youngveer	Goldboy	Goldboy	3:14
6.	"Mahi Ve"	Raahi	Oye Kunaal	Oye Kunaal	2:20
7.	"Wafa"	Raahi	Oye Kunaal	Ninja	3:33
8.	"Hanju"	Farmaan	Oye Kunaal	Afsana Khan	3:18
Total length:					25:12

== Release ==
The movie was theatrically released on 5 August 2022. It is also available for streaming on Chaupal Ott.
