= Rohit Jugraj Chauhan =

Indian film director and writer

- Occupations: Film director, screenwriter, producer

Rohit Jugraj Chauhan is an Indian film director, writer, and producer active in both Punjabi and Hindi cinema. He began his career as an assistant to directors Sanjay Leela Bhansali and Ram Gopal Varma before making his Bollywood debut with the film James (2005).

During the 2010s he shifted focus to Punjabi cinema, directing the popular films Jatt James Bond (2014) and the Sardaarji franchise (2015–2016), becoming one of the few directors to helm hit franchises starring Diljit Dosanjh and Gippy Grewal.

He wrote screenplay for the Bollywood action-thriller Players (2012). In 2022, he directed the Hindi web series Yeh Kaali Kaali Ankhein, followed by the Sony LIV musical-drama Chamak (2023), described as being based on true-life events.

== Personal life ==
Rohit Jugraj was in a relationship with the late model Viveka Babajee during the mid-2000s; they met while working on his debut film James.

== Filmography ==
Year	Title	Language	Role
2002	Kehtaa Hai Dil Baar Baar	Hindi	Assistant director
2003	Bhoot	Hindi	Assistant director
2003	Darna Mana Hai	Hindi	Assistant director
2005	James	Hindi	Director
2008	Superstar	Hindi	Director
2012	Players	Hindi	Screenplay writer
2013	Best of Luck	Punjabi	Creative director
2014	Jatt James Bond	Punjabi	Director
2015	Sardaar Ji	Punjabi	Director
2016	Sardaar Ji 2	Punjabi	Director
2018	Khido Khundi	Punjabi	Director
2019	Arjun Patiala	Hindi	Director
2023	Chamak	Hindi	Director
