= Muklawa =

2019 Indian Punjabi-language comedy-drama film

- Directed by: Simerjit Singh
- Written by: Upinderpal Waraich (story); Jagjit Saini (story)
- Screenplay by: Upinderpal Waraich, Jagjit Saini
- Produced by: Gunbir Singh Sidhu; Manmord Sidhu
- Starring: Ammy Virk; Sonam Bajwa; Gurpreet Ghuggi; Karamjit Anmol; B.N. Sharma
- Cinematography: Suresh Beesaveni
- Edited by: Rohit Dhiman
- Music by: Gurmeet Singh
- Production companies: White Hill Studios; Vikrant Studio
- Distributed by: White Hill Studios
- Release date: 24 May 2019
- Running time: 112 minutes
- Country: India
- Language: Punjabi
- Box office: ₹25.52 crore

Muklawa is a 2019 Indian Punjabi-language, comedy-drama film directed by Simerjit Singh under the banner of Ammy Virk Productions. The film is produced by Gunbir Singh Sidhu and Manmord Sidhu. The film stars Ammy Virk, Sonam Bajwa, Gurpreet Ghuggi, Karamjit Anmol and B.N. Sharma in leading roles with Gurpreet Bhangu, Sukhwinder Chahal, Rakhi Hundal, Drishtii Garewal and Sarbjit Cheema in supporting roles. Muklawa was released worldwide in cinemas on 24 May 2019.

== Plot ==
The whole film is based on the consequences of the old tradition of Punjabi culture after the wedding when a newly-wed bride is taken back to her husband's home for the first time to stay for 1 week.

== Cast ==
- Ammy Virk
- Sonam Bajwa
- Gurpreet Ghuggi
- Karamjit Anmol
- B.N. Sharma
- Gurpreet Bhangu
- Nirmal Rishi
- Sukhbir Singh Batth
- Sukhwinder Chahal
- Drishtii Garewal
- Sarabjit Cheema
- Rose Sardana
- Rakhi Hundal
- Tarsem Paul
- Anita Shabdeesh
- Sameer Pannu
- Sahib Singh Sandhu
- Parminder Gill

== Production ==
The film is Ammy Virk's home production where he launched his banner White Hill Studios along with Vikrant Studio. The whole movie was filmed in parts of Sri Ganganagar, Rajasthan, India.

== Music ==
The music of the film is composed by Gurmeet Singh and Mannat Noor, Happy Raikoti, Kamal Khan and Sukhy Maan are the playback singers.

Tracklist
No.	Title	Music	Singer(s)	Length
1.	"Kala Suit"	Gurmeet Singh	Ammy Virk, Mannat Noor	2:12
2.	"Gulabi Paani"	Gurmeet Singh	Ammy Virk, Mannat Noor	2:39
3.	"Muklawa"	Gurmeet Singh	Happy Raikoti, Harpi Gill	3:34
4.	"Rabb Jaane"	Gurmeet Singh	Kamal Khan	4:52
5.	"Jutti"	Gurmeet Singh	Ammy Virk, Mannat Noor	3:02
6.	"Boliyan"	Gurmeet Singh	Mannat Noor, Minda	2:05
7.	"Dawayi"	Gurmeet Singh	Karamjit Anmol	2:27
8.	"Ehnu Muklawa Aakhde"	Gurmeet Singh	Sukhy Maan, Vijay Yamla	3:05

== Reception ==
The film is includes in the list of high grossing Punjabi movies across the India, Pakistan, Australia, Canada, England and United States and have been done almost $474,162 revenue gross worldwide.

== Awards ==
The Muklawa blockbuster film received 1 best PTC Punjabi Film Awards as an best music and 2 times nominee of this award as best film and best director.
