= Disco Singh =

- Film poster
- Directed by: Anurag Singh
- Written by: Anurag Singh
- Produced by: Rajiee M. Shinde; Rabindra Narayanan
- Starring: See below
- Cinematography: Anshul Chobey
- Edited by: Manish More
- Music by: Jatinder Shah
- Production company: PTC Motion Pictures
- Release date: 11 April 2014
- Running time: 141 minutes
- Country: India
- Language: Punjabi
- Budget: ₹6 crore (US$630,000)
- Box office: ₹18.00 crore (US$1.9 million)

Disco Singh is a 2014 Punjabi comedy film directed by Anurag Singh and starring Diljit Dosanjh and Surveen Chawla. This is the third collaboration between Singh and Dosanjh after the blockbusters Jatt and Juliet (2012) and Jatt & Juliet 2 (2013). The shooting of Disco Singh began on 19 November 2013 in New Delhi apparently. The film released on 11 April 2014 to excellent box office collections all over Punjab. Despite receiving disastrous reviews from critics, it performed exceptionally well at the box office, breaking several records.

It is loosely based on 2009 Bollywood film Do Knot Disturb which in turn was a remake of the 2006 French film The Valet (French: La Doublure). Disco Singh was remade in Bengali as Haripad Bandwala under the banner of Shree Venkatesh Films starring Ankush Hazra and Nusrat Jahan in the lead roles.

== Plot ==
The story follows a singer named Lattu (Diljit Dosanjh) who is in love with Sweety (Surveen Chawla), a model. When don Bhupinder Singh (Manoj Pahwa) hires Lattu to perform at a wedding which Sweety also attends, a picture of the trio is captured by a spy who was hired by Bhupinder's wife Pammi (Upasna Singh) who suspects he is having an affair. When the news of Bhupinder cheating on his wife with Sweety is published in the newspaper, Bhupinder tells Pammi that Sweety is Lattu's girlfriend as he was also captured in the photo. Bhupinder's henchmen kidnap Lattu and Bhupinder tells him to pretend to be Sweety's boyfriend in order to make his wife's suspicion go away. Whilst pretending, Sweety and Lattu enter a real relationship which soon enrages Bhupinder who decides to take matters into his own hands, leading to a hilarious climax.

== Cast ==
- Diljit Dosanjh as Bandmaster Lattu Singh
- Surveen Chawla as Model Sweety
- Manoj Pahwa as Don Bhupinder Singh
- Upasna Singh as Pammi
- Prem Chopra as Papaji
- B.N. Sharma as Ikki
- Karamjit Anmol as Baai
- Apoorva Arora as Priya
- Rana Ranbir as Director
- Chandan Prabhakar as CID Officer

== Soundtrack ==
No.	Title	Artist(s)	Length
1.	"Ae Ji Oo Ji"	Diljit Dosanjh
2.	"Beautiful Billo"	Diljit Dosanjh
3.	"Disco Singh"	Diljit Dosanjh, Adrija
4.	"Faisley"	Kamal Khan
5.	"Happy Birthday"	Diljit Dosanjh
6.	"Lattu"	Diljit Dosanjh, Sunidhi Chauhan
7.	"Sweetoo"	Diljit Dosanjh

== Box office ==
According to Box Office India, Disco Singh has been overwhelmingly successful. In its first week in theatres, it grossed over ₹7 crore (US$740,000), making it the biggest Punjabi film ever in terms of opening numbers.

== PTC Punjabi Film Awards 2015 ==
Disco Singh won six awards at the 5th PTC Punjabi Film Awards in 2015.

Category	Winner's Name
Best Dialogues	Anurag Singh / Amberdeep Singh
Best Music Director	Jatinder Shah
Best Popular Song Of The Year	Diljit Dosanjh for Happy Birthday
Best Performance in a Comic Role	B.N. Sharma
Best Supporting Actress	Upasna Singh
Best Actress	Surveen Chawla
