= Sharan Kaur =

Indian actress

- Born: Sharan Kaur; Gurdaspur, Punjab, India
- Occupation: Actress
- Years active: 2018–

Sharan Kaur is an Indian actress and model active in Punjabi cinema. She played the leading female roles in Munda Faridkotia and the 2022 Punjabi film Shareek 2.

Sharan Kaur recently worked with Dev Kharoud and Jimmy Shergill in Shareek 2, directed by Navaniat Singh.

She played the leading female role in Munda Faridkotia and Punjabi film Shareek 2.

== Early life and modelling career ==
Sharan Kaur was born in Gurdaspur and is a Punjabi film actress. She studied at Panjab University, Chandigarh, and moved to Mumbai in 2015. She has appeared in the TV serials Thapki Pyar Ki and Savitri Devi College & Hospital. She received the best debut actress award at the PTC Punjabi Film Awards in 2020.

== Filmography ==
Year	Title	Role	Language	Notes
2019	Munda Faridkotia	Mariyam	Punjabi	Punjabi debut
2020	Shareek 2	Rupi	Punjabi	Filming
2020	Sayonee	Gurleen	Punjabi	Filming

== Awards and nominations ==
Year	Film	Award ceremony	Category	Result
2020	Munda Faridkotia	PTC Punjabi Film Awards 2020	Best Debut Actress	Won
