= Shareek 2 =

2022 Punjabi film

- Official poster
- Directed by: Navaniat Singh& Bobby Aujla
- Written by: Inderpal Singh
- Produced by: Vivek Ohri; Gunbir Singh Sidhu; Manmord Sidhu; Daljit Singh Thind
- Starring: Jimmy Sheirgill; Dev Kharoud; Sharan Kaur
- Cinematography: Harmeet Singh
- Edited by: Rohit Dhiman
- Music by: Salil Amrute
- Production companies: Ohri Productions; White Hill Studios; Thind Motion Films
- Distributed by: White Hill Studios; Ohri Productions
- Release date: 8 July 2022
- Country: India
- Language: Punjabi
- Box office: ₹18.62 crore (Note: India Nett - 8.30cr India Gross - 9.62cr Overseas - 9cr Total Worldwide Collection - 18.62cr)

Shareek 2 is a 2022 Punjabi drama film, produced under the banner of Ohri Productions, White Hill Studios & Thind Motion Films. This is a sequel to the 2015 film Shareek. Shareek 2 stars Jimmy Sheirgill in a dual role alongside Dev Kharoud, and Sharan Kaur. Just like the prequel, Shareek 2 was directed by Navaniat Singh. Jimmy Sheirgill and Mukul Dev were the only actors from the prequel to star in this film. The film released on 8 July 2022. The film marked Jimmy's comeback to Punjabi Cinema after a 4 year break.

== Cast ==
- Jimmy Sheirgill in a dual role as
  - Sardar Jaswinder/Jaswant Singh Randhawa a.k.a. Jassa, a royal Bhupinder Singh Randhawa and Amrit Kaur's son, Gurbaaz Singh Randhawa's Step-brother, Rupinder Kaur's husband and Fateh Singh Randhawa's father.
  - Fateh Singh Randhawa, Sardar Jaswant Singh Randhawa and Rupinder Kaur's son.
- Dev Kharoud as Gurbaaz Singh Randhawa a.k.a. Gurbaaz, Bhupinder Singh Randhawa and Parkash son and Sardar Jaswant Singh Randhawa's Step-brother.
- Sharan Kaur as Rupinder Kaur a.k.a. Rupi, Gurbaaz Singh Randhawa's lover, Sardar Jaswant Singh Randhawa's wife and Fateh Singh Randhawa's mother
- Yograj Singh as Bhupinder Singh Randhawa, Narinder Singh Randhawa's brother, Amrita Kaur and Parkasho's husband, and father to Jaswant Singh Randhawa, Gurbaaz Singh Randhawa, Gurtej Singh Randhawa, and Sargi Kaur Randhawa.
- Mukul Dev as Narinder Singh Randhawa, Bhupinder Singh Randhawa's brother and uncle to Jaswant Singh Randhawa and Gurbaaz Singh Randhawa.
- Mahavir Bhullar as loyal well-wisher of Randhawa family
- Anita Meet as mother to Rupinder Kaur Randhawa
- Aman Sutardhar as Gurtej Singh Randhawa, Bhupinder Singh Randhawa and Parkasho's younger son, Gurbaaz Singh Randhawa's Brother and Jaswant Singh Randhawa's step brother.
- Amar Noorie as Parkasho Kaur Randhawa, Sardar Bhupinder Singh Randhawa's second wife and mother to Gurbaaz Singh Randhawa and Gurtej Singh Randhawa
- Sunita Dhir as Amrita Kaur, Sardar Bhupinder Singh Randhawa's first wife and mother to Jaswant Singh Randhawa and Sargi Kaur Randhawa

== Soundtrack ==
Shareek 2

Soundtrack album by Gur Sidhu, Desi Crew, MixSingh, GoldBoy, Inder Dhammu, Jaidev Kumar
- Released: 22 June 2022
- Genre: Feature film soundtrack
- Length: 23:00
- Label: White Hill Music
External audio
- Jukebox on YouTube

Tracklist
No.	Title	Lyrics	Music	Singer(s)	Length
1.	"Bang Bang"	Jassa Dhillon	Gur Sidhu	Jassa Dhillon & Gur Sidhu	02:22
2.	"Piche Piche Jatt"	Kaptaan	Desi Crew	Dilpreet Dhillon & Harpi Gill	03:31
3.	"Musafir"	Maninder Buttar	MixSingh	Maninder Buttar	02:45
4.	"Udeek len De"	Youngveer	Goldboy	Goldboy	04:35
5.	"Ranjishan"	Amninder Pal Singh	Inder Dhamnu	Hassan Manak	03:00
6.	"Mere Saiyaan"	Jassa Sidhu	Jaidev Kumar	Yasir Hussain	06:59
Total length:					23:00

== Release ==
The movie was released on the big screens on 8 July 2022. It was also available for streaming on Chaupal Ott.
