= Anurag Singh (director) =

Indian filmmaker (born 1975)

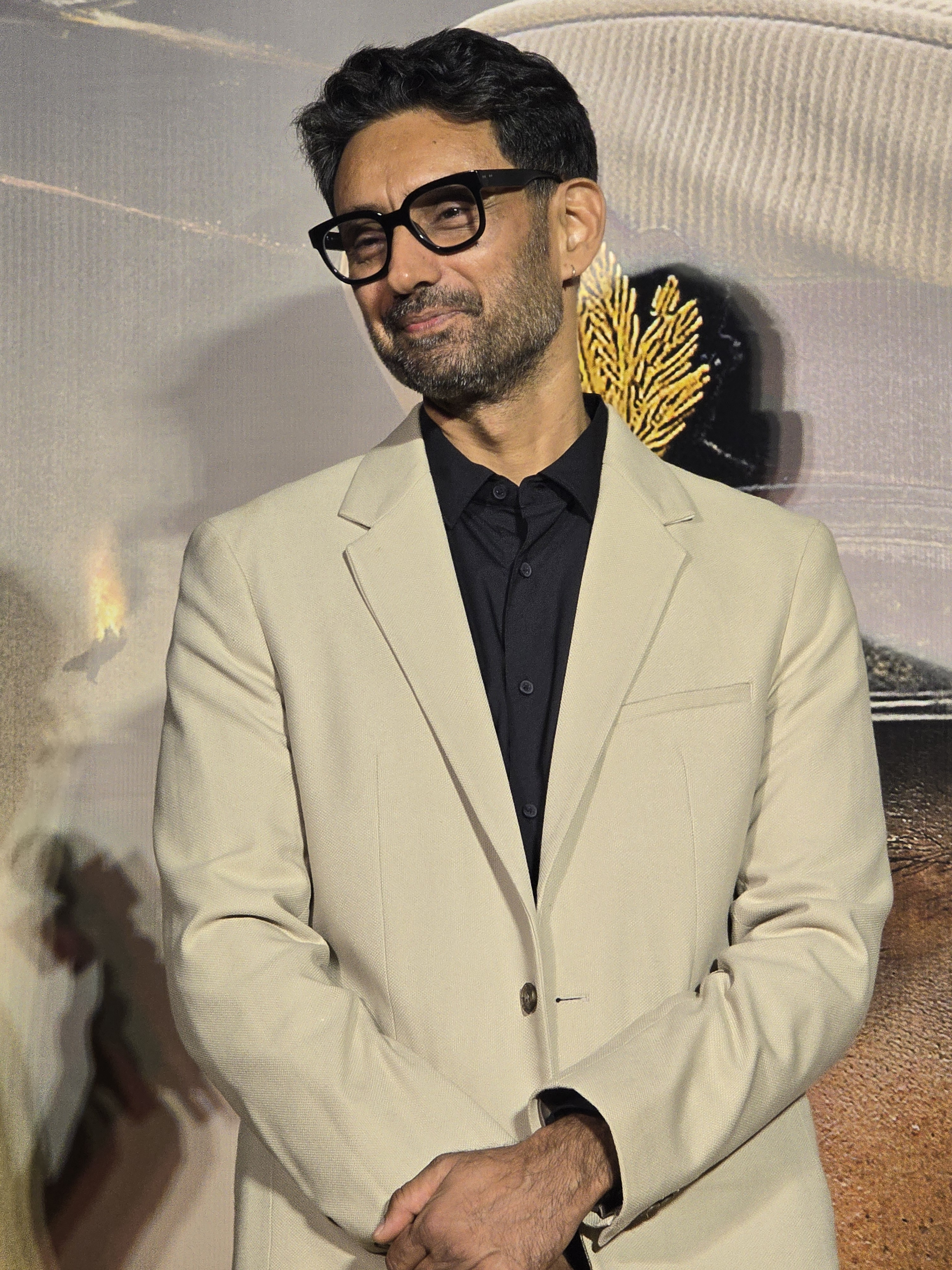
- Singh in 2025
- Born: Anurag Singh Thind; 17 November 1979 (age 46); Jalandhar, Punjab, India
- Occupations: Film director; screenwriter; producer
- Years active: 1997-present
- Notable work: Border 2; Kesari; Punjab 1984
- Spouse: Madhurjeet Sarghi (m. 2005)
- Children: 1

Anurag Singh Thind (born 17 November 1979) is an Indian film director, screenwriter and producer who mainly works in Punjabi and Hindi cinema. His directorial work includes the critically and commercially successful Hindi films Kesari (2019) and Border 2 (2026), alongside Punjabi movies such as Jatt & Juliet (2012) and Jatt & Juliet 2 (2013). He also directed the National Award Winning Punjabi film Punjab 1984 (2014).

== Early and personal life ==
Anurag Singh was born in Jalandhar, Punjab, into a family of professors. Singh, a medical student, travelled to Australia to study film. Singh was brilliant in studies throughout his schooling. The former Head Boy of St Joseph’s Boys School, Jalandhar, Anurag bagged an under 10 rank in medical entrance test. However he followed his passion and went into direction. He grew up in Jalandhar and is currently living in Mumbai, Maharashtra.

He married his childhood sweetheart Madhurjeet Sarghi, a theatre artist and actress who also hails from Jalandhar in 2005. In 2016, Singh and Sarghi had a child together.

== Career ==
During his early career, he assisted Bollywood director Raj Kanwar for several years before directing a Bollywood film of his own for Kanwar's production house. The film Raqeeb starring Jimmy Shergill, Sharman Joshi, and Tanushree Dutta was a commercial letdown. Upon release, it received mixed-to-negative reviews and was a box office flop.

Singh began working in Punjabi cinema and directed his debut film Yaar Annmulle with actor Arya Babbar in the lead role. The coming of age comedy film emerged as a breakout project for Singh as it was declared a 'hit' by Box Office India. He established himself in Pollywood with the movie Jatt & Juliet in 2012. Starring Diljit Dosanjh and Neeru Bajwa, it followed the rivalry and eventual friendship of the two characters played by the pair of actors, while navigating foreign life. The romantic comedy turned out to be a blockbuster and emerged as the highest grossing Punjabi film up to that point. It was also awarded several accolades.

Following the success of Jatt & Juliet, he worked exclusively with Diljit Dosanjh in several films in the Punjabi language, which achieved record-breaking success, including the comedies Jatt & Juliet 2 (2013) and Disco Singh (2014), the period drama Punjab 1984 (2014), and the superhero comedy Super Singh (2017). He also produced Shadaa (2019) starring Dosanjh, another major success. These films won him the PTC Punjabi Film Award for Best Director three times. His film Punjab 1984 won the Best Feature Film in Punjabi award at 62nd National Film Awards.

Singh made his return to Bollywood with the 2019 war film Kesari, which is based on the historic Battle of Saragarhi. The film featured Akshay Kumar and Parineeti Chopra in the lead roles, supported by an ensemble cast, and was co-produced by Karan Johar and Zee Studios. Upon its release, Kesari received mixed reviews but achieved significant commercial success. It earned ₹201 crore and became the highest-grossing film of Singh's career.

In 2021, he produced the Punjabi romantic comedy Puaada, starring Ammy Virk and Sonam Bajwa. Similar to his previous films, it was well received, and became the first Indian box office hit of the year following the COVID-19 pandemic. In 2022, he penned the story for Bollywood film Jugjugg Jeeyo.

Singh next directed Border 2, the sequel to the cult classic Border (1997). It stars Sunny Deol, who was previously offered the lead role in Kesari (2019), but turned it down. It also features Varun Dhawan, Diljit Dosanjh, and Ahan Shetty, marking Dosanjh's first collaboration with Singh since Shadaa (2019).

== Filmography ==
Year	Work	Credited as			Language
Year	Work	Director	Writer	Producer	Language
2007	Raqeeb	Yes	Yes	No	Punjabi
2011	Yaar Annmulle	Yes	Yes	No	Punjabi
2012	Jatt & Juliet	Yes	No	No	Punjabi
2013	Jatt and Juliet 2	Yes	Yes	No	Punjabi
2014	Disco Singh	Yes	Yes	No	Punjabi
2014	Punjab 1984	Yes	Yes	No	Punjabi
2017	Super Singh	Yes	Yes	Yes	Punjabi
2019	Kesari	Yes	Yes	No	Hindi
2019	Shadaa	No	No	Yes	Punjabi
2021	Puaada	No	No	Yes	Punjabi
2022	Jugjugg Jeeyo	No	Yes	No	Hindi
2026	Border 2	Yes	Yes	No	Hindi

Assistant director

- Ab Ke Baras (2002)
- Andaaz (2003)
- Humko Deewana Kar Gaye (2006)

== Awards and nominations ==
Award	Year	Category	Nominated work	Result	Ref(s)
ETC Bollywood Business Awards	2020	The 100 Crore Club	Kesari	Won	
Filmfare Awards Punjabi	2018	Best Film	Super Singh	Nominated	
Filmfare Awards Punjabi	2020	Best Film	Shadaa	Nominated	
National Film Awards	2015	Best Feature Film (Punjabi)	Punjab 1984	Won	
PTC Punjabi Film Awards	2012	Best Director	Yaar Annmulle	Nominated	
PTC Punjabi Film Awards	2012	Best Screenplay	Yaar Annmulle	Nominated	
PTC Punjabi Film Awards	2012	Best Dialogues	Yaar Annmulle	Nominated	
PTC Punjabi Film Awards	2013	Best Director	Jatt & Juliet	Won	
PTC Punjabi Film Awards	2014	Best Director	Jatt & Juliet 2	Won	
PTC Punjabi Film Awards	2014	Best Screenplay	Jatt & Juliet 2	Nominated	
PTC Punjabi Film Awards	2015	Best Director	Punjab 1984	Nominated	
PTC Punjabi Film Awards	2015	Best Director (Critics)	Punjab 1984	Won	
PTC Punjabi Film Awards	2015	Best Story	Punjab 1984	Won	
PTC Punjabi Film Awards	2015	Best Screenplay	Punjab 1984	Nominated	
PTC Punjabi Film Awards	2015	Best Dialogues	Punjab 1984	Nominated	
PTC Punjabi Film Awards	2015	Best Screenplay	Disco Singh	Nominated	
PTC Punjabi Film Awards	2015	Best Dialogues	Disco Singh	Won	
