= Sidhus of Southall =

Indian Punjabi film

- Directed by: Navaniat Singh
- Screenplay by: Inderpal Singh
- Produced by: Gunbir Singh Sidhu; Manmord Sidhu
- Starring: Sargun Mehta; Ajay Sarkaria; Prince Kanwaljit Singh; B. N. Sharma; Iftikhar Thakur; Amar Noorie; Jatinder Kaur
- Production company: White Hill Studios
- Release date: 19 May 2023
- Language: Punjabi

Sidhus of Southall is a Punjabi film starring Sargun Mehta, Ajay Sarkaria, Prince Kanwaljit Singh, B. N. Sharma, Iftikhar Thakur, Amar Noorie Harpreet Kaler and Jatinder Kaur. The film has been directed by Navaniat Singh and produced by Gunbir Singh Sidhu and Manmord Sidhu. Sidhus of Southall released on 19 May 2023. The screenplay for the film has been written by Inderpal Singh whereas the dialogues have been written by Bhindi Tolawal.

== Release ==
Sidhus of Southall premiered in theaters on 19 May 2023, and was subsequently released for digital streaming on the Chaupal OTT platform.

== Music ==
The music for the film consists of four songs sung by Oye Kunaal, Nachhatar Gill, Prabh Gill and Akhil (singer).

=== Track list of Sidhus of Southall ===
No.	Title	Lyrics	Singer(s)	Length
1.	"Deedar"	Happy Raikoti	Akhil (singer)	2:52
2.	"Allah"	Happy Raikoti	Prabh Gill	3:53
3.	"Godday Godday Chaa"	Raahi	Oye Kunaal	2:32
4.	"Sidhus of Southall (Title Track)"	Raahi	Nachhatar Gill	1:47
