= Jatt & Juliet 3 =

2024 Indian film by Jagdeep Sidhu

- Directed by: Jagdeep Sidhu
- Written by: Jagdeep Sidhu
- Produced by: Balwinder Singh; Dinesh Auluck; Gunbir Singh Sidhu; Darshan Singh Grewal; Manmord Sidhu; Diljit Dosanjh
- Starring: Diljit Dosanjh; Neeru Bajwa; Jasmin Bajwa
- Cinematography: Vineet Malhotra
- Edited by: Manish More
- Music by: Jaani
- Distributed by: White Hill Studios Speed Records
- Release date: 27 June 2024
- Running time: 137 minutes
- Country: India
- Language: Punjabi
- Box office: est. ₹110 crore

Jatt & Juliet 3 is a 2024 Indian Punjabi-language romantic comedy film written and directed by Jagdeep Sidhu. It is a spiritual successor to Jatt & Juliet (2012) and Jatt & Juliet 2 (2013). It stars Diljit Dosanjh and Neeru Bajwa, reprising their roles from the previous films, alongside, Jasmin Bajwa, Rana Ranbir, B. N. Sharma, and Nasir Chinyoti. The film follows two police officers on a mission in the UK, both secretly in love but believing their feelings are unreciprocated, leading them to try to make the other confess first. The film was a major success and emerged as the second highest grossing Punjabi film of all time.

== Plot ==
Two police officers from Punjab travel to the UK city of Bristol on a mission that takes an unexpected turn, leading to complications.

== Cast ==
- Diljit Dosanjh as Fateh Singh
- Neeru Bajwa as Senior Constable Pooja Singh
- Jasmin Bajwa as Divjot Kaur
- Rana Ranbir as Shampy
- B.N. Sharma as Shampy’s Dad
- Nasir Chinyoti
- Gurmeet Saajan
- Satwant Kaur
- Hardeep Gill
- Akram Udas
- Mohini Toor
- Mintu Kapa
- Kulvir Soni

== Release ==
Jatt & Juliet 3 was released worldwide on 27 June 2024.

=== Home media ===
Jatt & Juliet 3 was released on Chaupal OTT on 19 September 2024.

== Reception ==
=== Box office ===
The film collected ₹23.1 crore in first week in India. In second week it collected over ₹8.7 crore in India. The film is grossed over ₹107 crore worldwide becoming highest grossing Indian Punjabi film worldwide.

=== Critical response ===
Sukhpreet Kahlon of The Indian Express gave the film 4 out of 5, writing, "An overall enjoyable entertainer, Jatt & Juliet 3 has high-spirited humour, witty one-liners, good performances and foot-tapping music."

Saibal Chatterjee of NDTV rated 2 stars and wrote, "The unapologetically middle-brow and easy-flowing romantic comedy ticks all the boxes but trips just a touch in trying to articulate a surfeit of messages about gender equality, social harmony and other issues of contemporary relevance."

== Music ==
Track listing
No.	Title	Lyrics	Singer(s)	Length
1.	"Tu Juliet Jatt Di"	Sagar	Diljit Dosanjh	3:25
2.	"Sheraan Da"	Jaani	Diljit Dosanjh, Sultaan	2:17
3.	"Ki Hoya"	Jaani	B Praak, Afsana Khan	3:40
4.	"Haye Juliet"	Jaani	Diljit Dosanjh	2:56
5.	"Lehanga"	Jaani	Diljit Dosanjh	3:10
6.	"Je Main Rab Hunda"	Jaani	Bilal Saeed	3:43
Total length:				10:04
