= Gunbir Singh Sidhu =

Indian movie producer

- Born: Gunbir Singh Sidhu; Hoshiarpur
- Occupations: Film Producer, Distributor, Exhibitor
- Years active: 2012–Onwards
- Organisation(s): White Hill Production India Pvt. Ltd. & White Hill Music & Entertainment Pvt. Ltd.
- Awards: National Award for the Best Film (Punjab 1984) PTC Awards for best film Jatt & Juliet, Jatt & Juliet 2, Sardaarji and Punjab 1984.

Gunbir Singh Sidhu is an Indian movie producer. He did his schooling from Saint Stephen's School, Chandigarh & bachelors in technology from NIT Jalandhar and then went on to pursue his master's degree in electric engineering from Imperial College, London.

== Career ==
After completing his master's degree, he returned to India in 2004. He began his career as a trader of used cars. After a while, he established multiple business like real estate, education, agriculture & finance. Sidhu marked his debut into the film industry as the producer of blockbuster Punjabi film Jatt and Juliet in 2012 which was a massive success. He is the co owner of White Hill Production & White Hill Music with his brother and Partner Manmord(Sunny) Sidhu. He has produced some of the most successful Punjabi music videos.

== Filmography ==
- Jatt & Juliet 2012 (Producer)
- Jatt & Juliet 2 2013 (Producer)
- Tu Mera 22 Main Tera 22 2013 (Producer)
- Best of Luck 2013 (Producer)
- Romeo Ranjha 2014 (Producer)
- Punjab 1984 2014 (Producer)
- Sardaarji 2015 (Producer)
- Sardaarji 2 2015 (Producer)
- Saab Bahadar 2017 (Producer)
- Channa Mereya 2017 (Producer)
- Carry on Jatta 2 2018 (Producer)
- Muklawa 2019 (Producer)
- DSP Dev 2019 (Producer)
- Ardab Mutiyaran 2019 (Producer)
- Lekh 2022 (Producer)
- Shareek 2 2022 (Producer)
- Jind Mahi 2022 (Producer)
- Sidhus of Southall 2023 (Producer)
- Gaddi Jaandi Ae Chalaangaan Maardi 2023 (Producer)
- Jatt & Juliet 3 2024 (Producer)
- Nikka Zaildar 4 2024 (Producer)

== Distribution ==
- Daddy Cool Munde Fool
- Jatts In Golmaal
- Jatt & Juliet 2
- Fer Mamla Gadbad Gadbad
- Best of Luck
- Young Malang
- Nabar
- Heer & Hero
- Ishq Garaari
- Patiala Dreams (2014)
- Control Bhaji Control (2014)
- Honour Killing (2014)
- Bhatinda Express (2014)
