= Romeo Ranjha =

- Directed by: Navaniat Singh
- Written by: Dheeraj Rattan
- Produced by: Gunbir Singh Sidhu and Manmord Sidhu
- Starring: Jazzy B Garry Sandhu; Monica Bedi; Parul Gulati; Rana Ranbir; Yograj Singh; Rana Jung Bahadur; Sangha Jagir
- Edited by: Manish More
- Music by: Jatinder Shah
- Production company: White Hill Studios
- Distributed by: White Hill Studios
- Release date: 16 May 2014
- Country: India
- Language: Punjabi

Romeo Ranjha is a 2014 Punjabi language Indian action comedy film starring Jazzy B and Garry Sandhu written by Dheeraj Ratan, directed by Navaniat Singh, who also directed Singh vs Kaur. Romeo Ranjha is produced by Gunbir Singh Sidhu and Manmord Sidhu.

== Plot ==
Punjabis Romeo and Ranjha meet while working in Thailand. Ranjha falls in love with a girl named Preet who runs a refugee camp with the help of her uncle. The uncle says that he may only marry Preet if he makes a large donation to help the refugees. Ranjha secretly gives a large sum that belongs equally to Romeo. It transpires that Preet and her uncle are tricksters who have returned to the Punjab and previously duped Romeo out of money.

== Cast ==
- Jazzy B as Romeo
- Garry Sandhu as Ranjha
- Monica Bedi as DSP Reet Kaur
- Parul Gulati as Preet
- Rana Ranbir as Slaty
- Yograj Singh as Rancho
- Rana Jung Bahadur
- Sangha Jagir
- Gopi Bhalla

== Production ==
The film's title was changed from Rambo Ranjha to Romeo Ranjha. The first schedule was shot in Patiala.

== Soundtrack ==
A music launch function was held on 10 May 2014 in Chandigarh.
