= Sardaar Ji =

2015 Indian film by Rohit Jugraj Chauhan

Sardaarji
- Directed by: Rohit Jugraj
- Screenplay by: Dheeraj Rattan
- Story by: Dheeraj Rattan
- Produced by: Gunbir Singh Sidhu; Manmord Sidhu; Parminder Singh
- Starring: Diljit Dosanjh; Neeru Bajwa; Ali Kazmi; Mandy Takhar
- Cinematography: Parixit Warrier
- Edited by: Sandeep Francis
- Music by: Jatinder Shah; Nick Dhammu Raju Singh
- Production companies: White Hill Studios & Ekrehmat productions
- Distributed by: White Hill Studios
- Release date: 26 June 2015
- Running time: 141 minutes
- Country: India
- Language: Punjabi
- Budget: ₹8.50 crore (US$880,000)
- Box office: ₹38.38 crore (US$4.0 million)

Sardaar Ji is a 2015 Indian Punjabi fantasy horror comedy film directed by Rohit Jugraj, and starring Diljit Dosanjh, Mandy Takhar and Neeru Bajwa in lead roles. The trailer of the film was released on 18 May 2015. Sardaar Ji is one of the first fantasy films to be made in Punjabi cinema. It was released on 26 June 2015, and had the biggest opening ever for a Punjabi film in India .

== Plot ==
Jaggi (Diljit Dosanjh) is tasked with driving away a ghost (Neeru Bajwa) who haunts a mansion in London. However hilarious situations ensue when he falls in love with the ghost.

== Cast ==
- Diljit Dosanjh as Jaggi, the ghost hunter from Samrala
- Neeru Bajwa as Pinky, the spirit
- Mandy Takhar as Jasmine Kaur
- Jaswinder Bhalla as Armeek Singh a.k.a. Master
- Amritpal Chotu as Joondi, Jaggi's friend
- Ali Kazmi as Bilal Choudary
- Anita Kailey as Ruksana Bibi, Bilal's fiancée
- Damanpreet Singh as young Jaggi
- Avy Randhawa as Jaggi's Guide Angel
- Sunita Dhir as Pinky's Mother
- Jas Heer as Jasmine's Mother
- Bhavkhandan Singh Rakhra as Jasmine's father
- Darren Andrichuk as ghost Hunter from Discovery Channel
- Jessica Singh as Ghost
- Punam Randhawa as Mrs. Sharma
- Natasha Sharma as News Reporter
- Baljinder Darapuri as villager
- Sonam Bajwa Special Appearance in Veervaar song

== Soundtrack ==
=== Track listing ===
No.	Title	Lyrics	Music	Singer(s)	Length
1.	"I Love U Ji"	Veet Baljit	Nick Dhammu	Diljit Dosanjh	2:58
2.	"Roku Keda"	Veet Baljit	Jatinder Shah	Kaur B	3:20
3.	"Sardaarji"	Veet Baljit	Jatinder Shah	Diljit Dosanjh	2:08
4.	"Taare Mutiyare"	Veet Baljit	Nick Dhammu	Diljit Dosanjh	3:39
5.	"Time"	Veet Baljit	Jatinder Shah	Diljit Dosanjh	1:58
6.	"Veervaar"	Ranveer Sandhu	Jatinder Shah	Diljit Dosanjh ft Tarunam	2:22
Total length:					00:15:06

== Reception ==
=== Box office ===
The movie had a record opening in the history of Punjabi Cinema, it opened to 100% occupancies and shattered previous openings record of Jatt & Juliet 2. It collected ₹2.5 crore (US$260,000) on its first day in Punjab while Jatt & Juliet 2 earned ₹1.5 crore (US$160,000) on its opening day. Sardaar Ji also earned ₹14.45 crore (US$1.5 million) in its opening weekend recovering its making costs of ₹11 crore (US$1.1 million). Sardaar Ji beat Bollywood film ABCD 2 at overseas box office and topped the international collection chart.

In its first running week Sardaar Ji collected over ₹28 crore (US$2.9 million), highest ever in Punjabi cinema. It was the first Punjabi movie (Chaar Sahibzaade has total collection of ₹72 crore (US$7.5 million) as that movie was released in English, Hindi and Punjabi languages) to cross ₹30 crore (US$3.1 million) mark worldwide.

=== Critical response ===
CNN-IBN, Hindustan Times & The Tribune gave positive reviews to the movie. Film was also reviewed by British media like The Guardian.

== Sequel ==
A Sequel, entitled Sardaar Ji 2, directed by Rohit Jugraj, written by Dheeraj Rattan and produced by White Hill Production, was released on 24 June 2016. Diljit Dosanjh, Monica Gill and Sonam Bajwa starring as main leads.

== Telugu remake ==
Telugu Filmmaker Vasu Manthena acquired the rights of Sardaar Ji, to produce it in Telugu cinema.

== Television viewership record ==
In December 2015, Sardaar Ji broke UK TV ratings records by delivering the biggest ever audience for a channel as it registered a huge 54,900 viewers, peaking at 90,000 viewers.

== Accolades ==
Recipient(s) and nominee(s)	Award Ceremony	Category	Result
Jatinder Lall	PTC Punjabi Film Awards 2016	Best Dialogues	Won
Mandy Takhar	PTC Punjabi Film Awards 2016	Best Supporting Actress	Won
Diljit Dosanjh	PTC Punjabi Film Awards 2016	Most Popular Song of the Year	Won
