= Gur Sidhu =

Singer-rapper & record producer (born 1997)

Gur Sidhu ਗੁਰ ਸਿੱਧੂ
- Born: Gursimran Singh Sidhu; 11 July 1997 (age 29); Bathinda, Punjab, India
- Origin: Toronto, Canada
- Genres: Pop; Hip-hop; Bhangra; Folk
- Occupations: Singer; rapper; songwriter; record producer
- Years active: 2019–present
- Labels: Brown Town Music, White Hill Music, Times Music, Bamb Beats, Sony Music India, T-Series, Desi Junction
- Member of: Brown Town Music
- Members: Nav Sandhu; Cheema Y
- Past members: Jassa Dhillon
- Website: Gur Sidhu on Instagram

Gursimran Singh Sidhu (born 11 July 1997) is an Indian singer, rapper, and record producer known for his contributions to Punjabi music and cinema. He gained widespread recognition for his unique style, blending rap, hip-hop, and traditional Punjabi sounds. Sidhu is best known for his hit songs such as "California Love", "Bamb Aagya", "Vaddi Galbaat", "8 Parche", "Gabhru", "Dekhi Jau", "Ashke Ashke", and "Taakre", among many others.

== Early life and education ==
Gursimran Singh Sidhu was born on 11 July 1997 in the village of Chak Fateh Singh Wala, located in the Bathinda district of Punjab, India, to a Jat Sikh family. His father, Sukhbir Singh Sidhu, was also a Punjabi singer, which influenced Gursimran's early interest in music.

== Career ==
Following his debut, Sidhu’s career quickly gained momentum. In September 2019, he released "8 Parche", a collaboration with Baani Sandhu, under the White Hill Music label. The track became an instant hit, appreciated for its catchy chorus and youthful energy. Shortly after, in October 2019, Sidhu collaborated with Jassa Dhillon on the song "Pyar Bolda".

In the same year, Sidhu took his talents to the big screen, contributing to the soundtrack of the Punjabi feature film Ardab Mutiyaran (2019), starring Ninja (singer) and Sonam Bajwa. Sidhu sang, wrote, and composed "Challa", a song that captured the heart of the film and was widely praised for its energetic and emotive lyrics. This opportunity allowed Sidhu to showcase his versatility not only as a recording artist but also as a composer and contributor to the broader Punjabi entertainment industry.

In addition to his performances, Sidhu proved his prowess as a composer. He composed several hit songs for other artists, including "Subaah Jatt Da" (sung by Amrit Maan), "Taare" (sung by Sidhu Moose Wala), and "Regret" (sung by R Nait). These tracks became widely popular and reinforced Sidhu’s reputation as a skilled and innovative music producer.

In 2022, Sidhu achieved another major milestone with the release of his track "Bamb Aagya", a collaboration with renowned singer Jasmine Sandlas. The song became a massive hit, charting on the UK Asian Music Chart and also appearing on YouTube's Weekly Charts. The track's success showcased Sidhu’s growing influence in the global music scene and helped him gain recognition beyond the Punjabi-speaking diaspora.

Sidhu’s continued success and international appeal culminated in 2024 with the release of "California Love", a collaboration with Cheema Y. The song became a global sensation, trending across social media platforms and receiving millions of views on YouTube. "California Love" was praised for its catchy beat, innovative production, and seamless blend of Western and Punjabi musical influences, further solidifying Sidhu’s place as one of the most influential Punjabi artists of his generation.

== Discography ==
=== Studio albums ===
- Nothing Like Before (2021)
- Special Delivery (2023)
- Young GOAT (2025) (with Cheema Y)
- Longway (2025)
- The Simpsons (2025) (with Cheema Y)
- Bonafide (2026)
- Bermuda Triangle (2026) (with Cheema Y)

=== Extended plays ===
- Love War (with Jassa Dhillon) (2022)
- Step Up (Vol. 1) (2022)
- Dripster (with Cheema Y) (2023)
- Cloud 9 (with Cheema Y) (2024)

== Controversy ==
=== "Trump" Song Controversy ===
The core of the controversy focused on the song's key lyrical boast: "Jattan de puttan nu rok sake na Trump" (English: can't stop the sons of Jats). This line, along with others such as, "We didn't seek visas from embassies, we crossed over from where it is impossible to cross over," was widely quoted by news outlets and criticized for presenting a false, glamorous narrative of illegal migration while failing to highlight the reality of the risks and exploitation involved. Punjabi news channels addressed the issue, cautioning audiences against taking such songs seriously.
