= Baani Sandhu =

Indian singer and actress

- Sandhu in 2023
- Born: Rupinder Kaur Sandhu; Amritsar, Punjab, India
- Occupations: Singer; actress
- Years active: (2018 –present)
- Musical career
- Origin: Mohali, Punjab, India
- Genre: Punjabi
- Instrument: vocals
- Labels: White Hill Music; Desi Junction; Brown Town Music; Humble Music; Single Track Studios
- Website: Baani Sandhu on Instagram

Rupinder Kaur "Baani" Sandhu is an Indian singer and actress known for her work in Punjabi-language music and films.

== Early life ==
Baani Sandhu was born as Rupinder Kaur Sandhu in Amritsar, Punjab, India.

== Music career ==
Sandhu began her singing career in 2018 with the Punjabi tune "Fauji Di Bandook." The melody was delivered under Humble Music and Gippy Grewal. Then she worked together with Dilpreet Dhillon. She got her breakthrough in 2019 with the song "8 Parche," which appeared on the Global YouTube weekly chart and UK Music Asian Charts.

== Discography ==
=== Studio albums ===
Title	Album details	Lyrics	Co-artist(s)
The Boss Lady	Released: 4 August 2022; Label:Desi Junction; Music: Gur Sidhu, The Kidd,MixSingh, Retro; No. of tracks: 10; Distribution: Believe Music; Format: digital download, streaming	Jassi Lohka Kaptaan Babbu Jassa Dhillon	Gur Sidhu; Jassa Dhillon; Gurman Sandhu

=== Extended Play ===
Title	Album details
5 Diamonds	Released: 14 January 2024; No. of tracks: 10; Format: digital download, streaming

== Singles discography ==
=== As lead singer ===
Song	Year	Music	Songwriter	Label	Notes
Fauji Di Bandook	2018	Mistabaaz	Jassi Lohka	Humble Music	Launched by Gippy Grewal
Sarpanchi	2018	Western Pendu	Jassi Lohka	VS Records	Featuring Dilpreet Dhillon
Affair	2019	The Kidd	Jassi Lohka	White Hill Music	Featuring Dilpreet Dhillon
Photo	2019	Preet Hundal	Jassi Lohka	Single Track Studios	Featuring Jass Bajwa
8 Parche	2019	Gur Sidhu	Jassi Lohka	White Hill Music	Featuring Gur Sidhu
Phulkari	2020	Western Penduz	Jassi Lohka	White Hill Music	Featuring Dilpreet Dhillon
2 Ghore	2020	The Kidd	Jassi Lohka & Harvi	Desi Junction	Featuring Kamal Khaira
Bell Bottom	2020	Gur Sidhu	Jassi Lohka	Desi Junction	Featuring Mankirt Aulakh & Gur Sidhu
Majhe Wale	2021	The Kidd	Jassi Lohka	Desi Junction	Featuring Mr. MNV
Agg Att Koka Kehar	2021	Gur Sidhu	Kaptaan	Desi Junction	Deut with Gurnam Bhullar
Pistol	2021	Gur Sidhu	Jassi Lohka & Jassa Dhillon	Desi Junction	Featuring Jassa Dhillon
Tere Piche Piche	2022	MixSingh	Babbu	Desi Junction	
Jhanjar	2022	Gur Sidhu	Jassi Lohka	Desi Junction	Featuring Gur Sidhu
8 Vaje	2024	Dj Flow	Shree Brar	Baani Sandhu	
Horse Stick	2024	Black Virus	Mandeep Mavi	Baani Sandhu	
OMG	2026	Nvee	Kaptaan	Baani Sandhu	
All Black	2026	Rxmbo	Teji	Speed Records	Featuring Umar Riaz

=== As featured artist ===
Song	Year	Lead artist	Music	Lyricist	Label	Notes
Gunday Ik Vaar Fer	2018	Dilpreet Dhillon	Western Penduz	Jassi Lohka	Humble Music	Launched by Gippy Grewal
Teekhe Nain	2021	Jassa Dhillon	Gur Sidhu	Jassa Dhillon	Brown Town Music	Album - Above All
Kuwait Wala Koka	2022	Gurman Sandhu, Gurlez Akhtar	Desi Crew	Kaptaan	Desi Junction	
Pent Straight	2022	Gurnam Bhullar	Desi Crew	Kaptaan	Desi Junction	From Album "Majestic Laane"
Nagpuri Santra	2022	Gurman Sandhu	Shev	Kaptaan	Desi Junction	From EP "Free Of Style"

=== Soundtrack ===
Year	Film	Song	Music	Label	Notes
2019	Ardab Mutiyaran	Thar Jatti Di	Jassi Katyal	White Hill Music	Special Video Appearance with Sonam Bajwa
2023	Medal	Lucky No. 7	Avvy Sra	Desi Junction	Duet song with Mankirt Aulakh.
2025	Dakuaan Da Munda 3	Morni Majhe Di	Black Virus	ZEE5	

== Filmography ==
Year	Film	Role	Notes
2023	Medal	Rupinder Kaur	Debut movie as lead co-star with Jayy Randhawa
2025	Dakuaan Da Munda	Baani	Movie as lead co-star with Dev Kharoud
