= Jassa Dhillon =

Indian singer-rapper

- Born: Jaspal Singh Dhillon; 7 November 1999 (age 26); Assandh, Haryana, India
- Genres: Punjabi; pop; R&B; hip hop; bhangra
- Occupations: Singer; rapper; songwriter
- Instrument: Vocals
- Years active: 2019–present
- Labels: Jassa Dhillon; Brown Town Music; YRF Digital; Believe Artist Services
- Formerly of: Brown Town Music
- Website: jassadhillon.com

Jaspal Singh Dhillon, known professionally as Jassa Dhillon, is an Indian singer, rapper and songwriter associated with Punjabi music. His song "Talja" has featured on the UK Asian Music Chart and also the Global YouTube weekly chart. Dhillon started his career along with his labelmate Gur Sidhu under label 'Brown Town Music'.

== Early life and education ==
Dhillon was born 7 November 1999 in Assandh, in the Karnal district, Haryana, to Ranbir Singh Dhillon and Harjinder Kaur. He is a Dhillon Jat Sikh. He graduated from JPS Academy.

== Music career ==
Dhillon works in a variety of music styles, including Punjabi, Pop, Bhangra, Romantic and Hip Hop. Dhillon was launched by Nav Sandhu with "Pyar Bolda," a single released in October 2019 under banner of Brown Town Music. In December 2019, his song "Jhanjhar" was released by Brown Town Music. In January 2021, he announced his debut album "Above All" with Gur Sidhu as music producer on the album. In February, he released the first single from album "Above All" named "Raule", which later appeared on YouTube's weekly Global Music Chart. Dhillon also become one of the most-listened-to artists in Punjab. In March 2021, he released his album Above All. The album was critically successful, containing singles such as "Talja," "Love Like Me," "1 on 1," "Bhalwani Gedi," and other songs. The song "Talja" from the album featured on the UK Asian Music Chart. The album proved to be a breakthrough in Jassa's career.

== Discography ==
=== Studio albums ===
Title	Album details
Above All	Released: 2021; Music: Gur Sidhu; Exec. Producer: Nav Sandhu; Label: Brown Town Music; Format: Digital download, Streaming
Vibin	Released: 9 January 2022; Music: Deep Jandu, ProdGk, Mxrci, Thiarajxtt, Kelly; Label: Jassa Dhillon; Format: Digital download, Streaming
Bombaa	Released: 15 December 2023; Music: Gminxr, ProdGk, Deep Jandu, Mxrci, Thiarajxtt, Wazir Patar; Label: Jassa Dhillon; Format: Digital download, Streaming

=== Extended plays ===
List of EPs, with release date, label and selected chart positions
Title	EP details
Love War (with Gur Sidhu)	Released: 2022; Music: Gur Sidhu; Exec. Producer: Nav Sandhu; Label: Brown Town Music; Format: Digital download, streaming

== Singles discography ==
=== As lead artist ===
Track	Year	Music	Peak chart position		Label	Album
Track	Year	Music	UK Asian	UK Punjabi	Label	Album
Pyar Bolda	2019	Gur Sidhu	—	—	Brown Town Music	
Jhanjar	2019	Gur Sidhu	—	—	Brown Town Music	
Low Rider	2020	Gur Sidhu	—	—	Brown Town Music	
Manke	2020	Gur Sidhu	—	—	Brown Town Music	
Surma	2020	Gur Sidhu	—	—	Brown Town Music	
Faraar	2020	Gur Sidhu	—	—	Brown Town Music	
Folk Touch	2020	Gur Sidhu	—	—	Brown Town Music	
Jatt Jaffe (with Gurkez Akhtar)	2020	Gur Sidhu	—	—	Brown Town Music	
Gang Life (with Gur Sidhu)	2020	Gur Sidhu	—	—	Brown Town Music	
Mutyaare Ni (with Bohemia)	2020	Gur Sidhu	—	—	Yash Raj Films (YRF)	
Pistol (with Baani Sandhu)	2021	Gur Sidhu	—	—	Desi Junction	
Pyar Hogya	2021	Gur Sidhu	—	—	Brown Town Music	
Raule (with Gurlez Akhtar)	2021	Gur Sidhu	—	—	Brown Town Music	"Above All"
Above All (feat Gur Sidhu)	2021	Gur Sidhu	—	—	Brown Town Music	"Above All"
Love Like Me	2021	Gur Sidhu	—	—	Brown Town Music	"Above All"
Talja (with Gur Sidhu and Deepak Dhillon)	2021	Gur Sidhu	8	4	Brown Town Music	"Above All"
Bhalwani Gedi	2021	Gur Sidhu	—	—	Brown Town Music	"Above All"
Taakre (with Gur Sidhu)	2021	Gur Sidhu	—	—	Brown Town Music	"Nothing Like Before"
Love War	2022	Gur Sidhu	—	—	Brown Town Music	"Love War (EP)"
Shadow	2022	Gur Sidhu	—	—	Brown Town Music	"Love War (EP)"
Bang Bang (with Gur Sidhu)	2022	Gur Sidhu	—	—	White Hill Music	Shareek 2 soundtrack
MOB	2022	Mxrci	—	—	Jassa Dhillon	
Kajla (with Pavitar Lasoi)	2022	ProdGK	—	—	Jassa Dhillon	
Yaad	2022	ProdGK	23	14	Jassa Dhillon	
Don’t You	2022	Thiarajxtt	—	—	Thiarajxtt	
Troublemaker	2022	Mxrci	—	—	Jassa Dhillon	
True Talks	2022	ProdGK	—	—	Jassa Dhillon	
Hukam	2023	ProdGK	—	—	Jassa Dhillon	Vibin’
Assault	2023	ProdGK	—	—	Jassa Dhillon	Vibin’
Takraar	2023	ProdGK	—	—	Jassa Dhillon	Vibin’
Spain	2023	Thiarajxtt	11	8	Jassa Dhillon	Vibin’
Pyaar Diya Gallan	2023	Deep Jandu	—	—	Jassa Dhillon	Vibin’
Spain (Extended Version)	2023	Thiarajxtt	—	—	Jassa Dhillon	Vibin’
Jhoote (with Deepak Dhillon)	2023	Proof	—	—	Jassa Dhillon	
You	2023	Mxrci			Jassa Dhillon	
Do Or Die	2023	ProdGK			Jassa Dhillon	
Ayee (with Harnoor)	2023	Big Kay SMG			Jassa Dhillon	
Angel	2023	Alter			Jassa Dhillon	Bombaa
Hasdi	2023	ProdGK	36		Jassa Dhillon	Bombaa
Gurl (featuring Harnoor)	2023	Thiarajxtt			Jassa Dhillon	Bombaa

=== As featured artist ===
Title	Year	Peak chart position		Label	Album
Title	Year	UK Asian	UK Punjabi	Label	Album
Jatta (Pavitar Lasoi featuring Jassa Dhillon)	2023	—	—	Vibe Music Studios	
21 Questions (Sukha featuring Jassa Dhillon)	2023	—	14	Sukha	Undisputed

=== Film Soundtracks ===
Film	Year	Title	Music	Label
Shareek 2	2022	Bang Bang (with Gur Sidhu)	Gur Sidhu	White Hill Music

== Songwriting discography ==
As lyrisist (songwriter)
Track	Year	Artist(s)	Music	Label	Album
Kaafla	2020	Gur Sidhu, Gurlez Akhtar	Gur Sidhu	Brown Town Music & Nav Sandhu	
Oh Munde	2020	Gur Sidhu	Gur Sidhu	Brown Town Music & Nav Sandhu	
Sham Da Laara	2020	Gur Sidhu	Gur Sidhu	Brown Town Music & Nav Sandhu	
Sau Putt	2021	Gur Sidhu	Gur Sidhu	Speed Records & Nav Sandhu	
Yaarane	2021	Gur Sidhu	Gur Sidhu	Brown Town Music & Nav Sandhu	
Cherry Cheeks	2021	Gur Sidhu	Gur Sidhu	Brown Town Music & Nav Sandhu	Nothing Like Before
Mitho	2021	Gur Sidhu, Mannat Noor	Gur Sidhu	Brown Town Music & Nav Sandhu	Nothing Like Before
Daang	2021	Gur Sidhu	Gur Sidhu	Brown Town Music & Nav Sandhu	Nothing Like Before
Parche	2021	Gur Sidhu	Gur Sidhu	Brown Town Music & Nav Sandhu	Nothing Like Before
Dila Ve (Note: also featured in music video)	2021	Gur Sidhu	Gur Sidhu	Brown Town Music & Nav Sandhu	Nothing Like Before
Theth Punjaban	2022	Baani Sandhu, Gur Sidhu	Gur Sidhu	Desi Junction	The Boss Lady
