= Manmord Sidhu =

Indo-Canadian film producer, director, and distributor

- Born: Manmord Sidhu; Chandigarh, India
- Occupations: Film director, film producer, film distributor, businessman
- Years active: Since 2005
- Organisation(s): White Hill Production India Pvt. Ltd. White Hill Music & Entertainment Pvt. Ltd. White Hill Production Inc. (Canada) White Hill Production PTY LTD. (Australia)
- Awards: National Award for the Best Film (Punjab 1984) PTC Awards for best film Jatt & Juliet, Jatt & Juliet 2, Sardaarji and Punjab 1984.

Manmord Sidhu, is an Indo-Canadian film producer, director, and distributor who is primarily known for his work in Punjabi films. Manmord Sidhu was 20 when he moved to Vancouver with his family. There he enrolled in Vancouver Film School. Sidhu made his directorial debut with the blockbuster Best of Luck.

His most famous release is Punjab 1984 released in 2014, which won The National Award in 2014.

== White Hill Studios ==
Manmord Sidhu formed production and distribution companies named White Hill Production India Pvt. Ltd., White Hill Music & Entertainment Pvt. Ltd., White Hill Production Inc. (Canada) & White Hill Production Pty Ltd. (Australia).

== Filmography ==
- Canadian Dream
- Jatt & Juliet
- Jatt & Juliet 2
- Best of Luck 2013
- Punjab 1984
- Romeo Ranjha
- Sardaar Ji
- Sardaar Ji 2
- Saab Bahadar
- Channa Mereya
- Carry on Jatta 2
- Muklawa
- DSP Dev
- Ardab Mutiyaran
- Shareek 2
- Lekh
- Jind Mahi
- Sidhus of Southall
- Gaddi Jaandi Ae Chalaangaan Maardi
- Jatt & Juliet 3

== Distribution ==
- Jatt & Juliet
- Carry On Jatta
- Jatt & Juliet 2
- Tu Mera 22 Main Tera 22
- Best of Luck
- Punjab 1984
- Romeo Ranjha
- Sadda Haq
- Bha Ji in Problem
- Drishyam
- Shareek
- Sardaarji
- Airlift
- Ghayal Once Again
- Love Punjab
- Ambarsariya
- Udta Punjab
- Sardaar Ji 2
- Pink
- Nikka Zaildar
- Rabb Da Radio
- Manje Bistre
- Begum Jaan
- Muklawa
- Kabir Singh
- Shadaa
