= Sardaar Ji 2 =

2016 Indian film by Rohit Jugraj Chauhan

- Directed by: Rohit Jugraj
- Written by: Dheeraj Rattan
- Screenplay by: Dheeraj Rattan
- Story by: Dheeraj Rattan
- Produced by: Manmord Sidhu; Gunbir Singh Sidhu
- Starring: Diljit Dosanjh; Sonam Bajwa; Monica Gill; Jaswinder Bhalla; Yashpal Sharma
- Cinematography: Sandip Patil
- Edited by: Sandeep Francis; Samar Singh
- Music by: Jatinder Shah; Nick Dhammu
- Production company: White Hill Studios
- Distributed by: White Hill Studios
- Release date: 24 June 2016
- Running time: 145 minutes
- Country: India
- Language: Punjabi

Sardaar Ji 2 (previously The Return of Sardaarji) is a 2016 Indian Punjabi action comedy film starring Diljit Dosanjh in a triple role alongside Monica Gill, and Sonam Bajwa in lead roles and directed by Rohit Jugraj Chauhan. The film was released on 24 June 2016. It is a standalone sequel to the 2015 film Sardaar Ji. On release, the film received mixed reviews.

== Cast ==
- Diljit Dosanjh in a triple role as
  - Sardaarji Jaggi Singh
  - Sardaarji Athraa Singh
  - Sardaarji Satkaar Singh
- Monica Gill as Soni
- Sonam Bajwa as Diljot
- Yashpal Sharma as Teja
- Samreen Kaur as Shiney
- Jaswinder Bhalla as Pathan Chacha
- Dev Gill as Diljyot's fiancée
- Mandy Takhar (special appearance in "Poplin")
- Amritpal Chotu as Fauji's son
- Anjana Sukhani as Dr. Teena (Anger management therapist)

== Planning and shooting ==
After the success of Sardaar Ji, producers decided on a sequel The Return of Sardaarji. The shooting of the film took place in different locations in Australia mainly. Diljit was mobbed by his Australian fans to his surprise when he reached the airport in Australia. The crew also shot at the Macarthur region of New South Wales. During the shoot, Diljit rescued Sonam and others from a horrible accident at the set. Diljit had to undergo 6 months of intensive physical training by hiring Ranbir Kapoor's personal trainer Pradeep Bhatia.

== Soundtrack ==
Sardaarji 2

Soundtrack album by Jatinder Shah & Nick Dhammu
- Released: 28 May 2016
- Genre: Feature film soundtrack
- Length: 17:17
- Label: Speed Records

The soundtrack of Sardaarji 2 was composed by Jatinder Shah & Nick Dhammu while the lyrics were written by Veet Baljit and Ranbir Singh.

The video of the film's title track Sardaarji was shot for two days in a row, created a record as it features 2500 Sardars dressed in white attires and turbans, out of which 1200 are Diljit's fans who came specially to shoot for the song.

S. No.	Track	Singer	Music	Lyrics
1.	"Desi Daaru"	Diljit Dosanjh	Jatinder Shah	Ranbir Singh
2.	"Mitran Da Junction"	Diljit Dosanjh	Jatinder Shah	Ranbir Singh
3.	"Poplin"	Diljit Dosanjh	Jatinder Shah	Veet Baljit
4.	"Razamand"	Diljit Dosanjh	Jatinder Shah	Ranbir Singh
5.	"Sardaarji"	Diljit Dosanjh	Jatinder Shah	Ranbir Singh
6.	"Rumaal"	Diljit Dosanjh	Nick Dhammu	Ranbir Singh

== Release ==
The film was released on the big screens on 24 June 2016.

== Reception ==
=== Accolades ===
Award	Year	Category	Nominee(s)	Result	Ref.
Filmfare Awards Punjabi	2017	Best Director	Rohit Jugraj	Nominated	
Filmfare Awards Punjabi	2017	Best Music Album	Jatinder Shah	Nominated	
Filmfare Awards Punjabi	2017	Best Foreign Talent	Tiffany Jones	Nominated	
Filmfare Awards Punjabi	2017	Best Lyrics	Ranbir Singh – "Mitran da junction"	Nominated	
Filmfare Awards Punjabi	2017	Best Lyrics	Veet Baljit – "Poplin"	Nominated	
Filmfare Awards Punjabi	2017	Best Playback Singer (Male)	Diljit Dosanjh – "Mitran da junction"	Won	
