= Best of Luck (2013 film) =

- Theatrical release poster
- Directed by: Manmord Sidhu
- Screenplay by: Dheeraj Rattan, Anugrah Bohrey
- Story by: Dheeraj Rattan
- Produced by: Sippy Grewal; Gunbir Singh Sidhu
- Starring: Gippy Grewal; Jazzy Bains; Simran Kaur Mundi; Sonam Bajwa
- Cinematography: Toby Gorman
- Edited by: Manish More
- Music by: Jatinder Shah
- Production company: White Hill Studios
- Distributed by: White Hill Studios
- Release date: 26 July 2013
- Countries: India, Canada
- Language: Punjabi

Best of Luck is a Punjabi film starring Gippy Grewal, Jazzy B (in his acting debut), Binnu Dhillon, Simran Kaur Mundi (Miss India Universe 2008) and Sonam Bajwa.

Music for the film was composed by Jatinder Shah. Shooting of the film started in May 2012 in Vancouver, British Columbia, Canada, and the second schedule was completed in Jalandhar, Punjab in September 2012.

== Plot ==
Kallu (Gippy Grewal) and Happy (Binnu Dhillon) accidentally kidnap Goli (Jazzy B). Goli, a gangster, then uses these two to help him win over Preet(Simran Kaur Mundi)'s Grandfather so that he can marry Preet.

== Cast ==
- Jazzy B as Goli
- Gippy Grewal as Kullu
- Simran Kaur Mundi as Preet
- Sonam Bajwa as Simran
- Binnu Dhillon as Happy
- Bobby Bedi as Shamsher singh
- Rishma Johal as Jot
- Puneet Issar as Jarnail Singh
- Karamjit Anmol as Servant Ballu
- Harpal singh as Harpal (Simran's father)
- Miss Pooja as Herself (Special Appearance)
- Parminder Bagga as Cop (Cameo)

== Music ==
Best of Luck

Soundtrack album by Gippy Grewal, Jazzy B, Javed Ali, Kamal Khan, Master Saleem
- Released: 10 July 2013
- Genre: Punjabi, Bhangra
- Label: Speed Records (India); Moviebox (UK)
- Producer: Jatinder Shah

Gippy Grewal, Jazzy B, Javed Ali, Kamal Khan, Master Saleem chronology
Carry On Jatta (2012)	Best of Luck (2013)

- "Gal 91 Ya 92" - Gippy Grewal - Music: Jatinder Shah - Lyrics: Veet Baljit
- "Goli Hik Vich" - Gippy Grewal, Jazzy B - Music: Jatinder Shah - Lyrics: Veet Baljit
- "Happy Shappy" - Gippy Grewal, Jazzy B - Music: Jatinder Shah - Lyrics: Kumaar
- "Jatt Kaym" - Jazzy B - Music: Jatinder Shah - Lyrics: Gurminder Mado-K
- "Judaiyan" (Version 1) - Javed Ali - Music: Jatinder Shah
- "Judaiyan" (Version 2) - Master Saleem - Music: Jatinder Shah
- "Papa Nu Pata Lag Ju" - Gippy Grewal - Music: Jatinder Shah - Lyrics: Kumaar
- "Rattan Lamiyan" (Version 1) - Kamal Khan - Music: Jatinder Shah - Lyrics: Javed Ali
- "Rattan Lamiyan" (Version 2) - Javed Ali - Music: Jatinder Shah - Lyrics: Javed Ali
