= Darshan Singh Grewal =

Indian Punjabi film producer

Darshan Pal Singh Grewal is a producer of Punjabi movies Jatt & Juliet (2012) and Dharti (2011). He has also produced Babbu Maan's Ekam - Son of Soil (2010) and Hero Hitler In Love (2011). His next movies as a producer are Jatt and Juliet 2 (2013) and Just U & Me (2013). He is also the owner of Punjabi music channels Josh and Tadka.

== Film career ==
He began as an executive producer for Ekam-Son of Soil (2010), as Grewalz Cine Corp.

== Filmography ==
=== Producer ===
- Jatt & Juliet 3 (2024)
- Just U & Me (2013)
- Jatt & Juliet 2 (2013)
- Jatt & Juliet (2012) (as "Darshanpal Singh Grewal") - Winner - PTC Best Film
- Hero Hitler In Love (2011) (as "Darshan Pal Singh Grewal")
- Dharti (2011) (as "D. S. Garewal") - Winner - PTC Best Film (Critics)
- Ekam - Son of Soil (2010) (Executive Producer)
