= Jatt & Juliet 2 =

2013 Indian film by Anurag Singh

- Directed by: Anurag Singh
- Written by: Dheeraj Rattan; Amberdeep Singh
- Produced by: Gunbir Singh Sidhu; Manmord Sidhu; Darshan Singh Grewal
- Starring: Diljit Dosanjh; Neeru Bajwa
- Cinematography: Anshul Chobey
- Edited by: Manish More
- Music by: Raju Rao; Jatinder Shah; Jassi Katyal
- Production company: White Hill Studios
- Distributed by: White Hill Studios
- Release date: 28 June 2013
- Running time: 141 minutes
- Country: India
- Language: Punjabi
- Budget: ₹6.75 crore
- Box office: ₹38.9 crore

Jatt & Juliet 2 is a 2013 Indian Punjabi romantic comedy film directed by Anurag Singh. The film is a spiritual sequel to the 2012 blockbuster Jatt & Juliet. Actors Diljit Dosanjh and Neeru Bajwa reprise their roles from the previous film in the sequel amongst other characters. The film released on 28 June 2013, almost a year after the release of the prequel, and received a positive response at the box office.

Jatt & Juliet 2 went on to become the highest-grossing Punjabi film ever, thus beating the record previously held by Jatt & Juliet. It is the first ever Punjabi film to be released on Blu-ray. A sequel, Jatt & Juliet 3, was released on June 27, 2024.

== Plot ==
Fateh Singh (Diljit Dosanjh) is a Punjab police constable who desperately wants a promotion to the rank of Inspector. He steals the uniform of his superior, Village Inspector Joginder Singh (Jaswinder Bhalla) and tells his family that he got promoted. The morning after the party to celebrate Fateh's "promotion", Inspector Singh reams out Fateh for stealing his uniform. During a meeting with the District Commissioner, who shares that he cannot see his daughter, Pooja (Neeru Bajwa), following a nasty divorce from her mother, the Commissioner tasks Inspector Singh with going to Canada to convince Pooja, who, to the Commissioner's knowledge, is a hairdresser in Vancouver, and Pooja's mom to move back to India. Realizing this is an opportunity to get rid of Fateh, Inspector Singh tasks Fateh with going to Canada to bring Pooja back. Fateh assumes that it should be a fairly easy task and departs.

He flies to Canada and upon reaching Vancouver, starts his mission to bring Pooja back. He receives his visa under the guise of being in a police partnership between the Punjab Police and the Vancouver Police Department to catch a criminal named "Shampy Daku". Unbeknownst to Fateh, the police officer he is paired with is actually Pooja, who left the hairdresser job to become a cop. To avoid working in this police partnership with Pooja and to seek out Pooja, Fateh fakes being sick several times. Fateh believes that Pooja's friend Preeti, who still works at the beauty salon, as Pooja herself. Fateh starts to convince Preeti (acting as Pooja) to come back to India as Fateh's husband. After being invited to Preeti's house, Fateh learns that Preeti is not Pooja and that Pooja is actually the police officer he's been partnered with.

Fateh, with the clock ticking on his Visa avoid deportation back to India, reconciles with Pooja and helps Pooja to convince her mother in getting herself roped with a Caucasian guy named Chris, whom Pooja has real feelings for. This clashes with his irreverent and unsophisticated personality, but soon the two begin to find themselves drawn to one another. Realizing his feelings for Pooja, Fateh tries to get rid of Chris by making Chris embarrass himself in front of Pooja's mom. However, not long after, Pooja learns the real reason for Fateh's visit, and angrily leaves him. With the nature of Fateh's visit uncovered, Fateh faces deportations and is now forced to back to India without Pooja. Inspired by a villager who as a subplot throughout the entire movie is battling with the Punjab Police to get to Canada, Fateh goes to the church, where Pooja and Chris are to be wed, and steals Pooja away from her wedding to get her to India. The entire drive to the airport, Fateh tries to make amends and profess his feelings for Pooja.

The movie ends with Fateh successfully reuniting the Commissioner and Pooja, and Fateh receiving a promotion to Inspector.

== Cast ==
- Diljit Dosanjh as Head Constable Fateh Singh
- Neeru Bajwa as Constable Pooja Singh
- Rana Ranbir as Shampy / Loveoshan Singh
- Jaswinder Bhalla as Inspector Joginder Singh
- B.N. Sharma as Gunoshan Singh Chawla (Shampy Da Daddy)
- Bharti Singh as Preet / Fake Pooja
- Jacob Insley as Chris
- Dolly Mattoo as Pooja's mother
- Rana Jung Bahadur as Pakistani taxi driver
- Anita Devgan as Fateh Singh's mother
- Vijay Tandon as Pooja's father
- Amrit Billa as Fateh Singh's father
- Balinder Johal as Pooja's grandmother
- Moishe Teichman as Wedding Priest
- Jazzy B in a special appearance
- Jenny Ghotra in a guest appearance in the song "Mr. Singh"

== Release ==
Jatt & Juliet 2 was theatrically released on June 28, 2013.

=== Home media ===
It is the first ever Punjabi film to be released on Blu-ray. It can also be streamed on the Chaupal streaming service.

== Reception ==
The Hindustan Times gave a positive review for Jatt & Juliet 2, praising the film's acting and music, while commenting that "audiences would do well to not compare the film with the original". On 25 October Jatt & Juliet became the first Punjabi Movie made in Punjab, India to have been released in Pakistan. The film has been released in Pakistan by Surya Basic Brothers Distribution and White Hill Studios in association with Yellow Hill Media and Entertainment (Pakistan).

== Box office ==
Jatt & Juliet 2 has emerged as the biggest blockbuster of Punjabi cinema. The film has made a box office collections nearing ₹20 crore (US$2.1 million) approx (All India). Jatt & Juliet 2 has broken all records in 12 days of run and established new benchmarks for the industry all over.

It collected approximately ₹7 crore (US$730,000)-₹7.50 crore (US$780,000) in the 1st week and dropped by just 30-35% in 2nd weekend and managed a further ₹3 crore (US$310,000). It had collected ₹10 crore (US$1.0 million) in 10 days and surpassed previous record of ₹10.50 crore (US$1.1 million) lifetime of Jatt & Juliet by end of 2nd week.

It finished with ₹11.75 crore (US$1.2 million) after two weeks and a lifetime figure was in the range of ₹17 crore (US$1.8 million)-₹18 crore (US$1.9 million), touching ₹20 crore (US$2.1 million). It also collected ₹1.75 crore (US$180,000) in the India overall which means worldwide collection stood in excess of ₹18 crore (US$1.9 million).

== Remake ==
Vasu Manthena acquired the rights of Jatt & Juliet 2, to produce it in Telugu cinema.

== Awards ==
Jatt & Juliet 2 won four awards at the 4th PTC Punjabi Film Awards in 2014.

Category	Winner's Name
Best Film	Speed Records & White Hill Productions
Best Director	Anurag Singh
Best Actor	Diljit Dosanjh
Best Actress	Neeru Bajwa
