= Ardab Mutiyaran =

2019 Punjabi language romantic drama film

- Theatrical release poster
- Directed by: Manav S Shah
- Screenplay by: Dheeraj Rattan
- Story by: Dheeraj Rattan
- Produced by: Gunbir Singh Sidhu; Manmord Sidhu
- Starring: Sonam Bajwa; Mehreen Pirzada; Ajay Sarkaria; Ninja
- Cinematography: Suresh Beesaveni
- Edited by: Bharat S Raawat
- Music by: Sandeep Saxena
- Production companies: White Hill Studios; Towchain Motion Pictures
- Distributed by: White Hill Studios
- Release date: 18 October 2019
- Country: India
- Language: Punjabi
- Budget: 4.5cr
- Box office: 21cr

Ardab Mutiyaran is a 2019 Punjabi-language romantic comedy drama film directed by Manav Shah. The film is produced by Gunbir Singh Sidhu and Manmord Sidhu under the banner White Hill Studios. Starring Sonam Bajwa, Mehreen Pirzada, Ajay Sarkaria and Ninja, the story of the film revolves around Babbu Bains (played by Sonam Bajwa), who fights evils of the society in her own style. She represents all the women, who fight for their own identity.

It was released on 18 October 2019.

== Plot ==
Babbu Bains, a young, spirited and bold girl finds her calling as a recovery agent in a finance company (Chaddha Finance) run by another headstrong girl, Shruti. Babbu’s partner Vicky is always at the receiving end of Shruti’s wrath. Owing to their constant clashes, Shruti sends Babbu for a false recovery to bring her down. This results in Babbu meeting Rinku Bansal, an only bachelor in his house dominated by his sisters-in-law. Rinku falls head over heels in love with her at first sight. Rinku and Babbu get married and Vicky ends up tying the knot with Shruti. Vickey's household is dominated by his mother Sudesh as his dad is a hen-pecked husband. Thus, begins the epic saga of power play between these women both at their workplace and their respective homes. While the men try to make peace between them but end up being pulled at both the ends in this tug of war.

== Cast ==
- Sonam Bajwa as Babbu Bains Bansal (Vicky's friend and Rinku's wife)
- Ajay Sarkaria as Rinku Bansal (Bittu's brother and Babbu's husband)
- Mehreen Pirzada as Shruti Chadda Ahuja (Vicky's wife)
- Ninja as Vicky Ahuja (Anuja and Sudesh's son, and Shruti's husband)
- B. N. Sharma as Ahuja
- Upasana Singh as Sudesh
- Sudesh Lehri as Bittu Bansal (Rinku's brother and Babbu's brother-in-law)
- Rajeev Mehra as Sunil Bansal
- Navneet Nishan as Darshana Chadda
- Inderpal Singh as Chadda Financer
- Chesta Bhagat as Saroj Bansal
- Myra Singh as Mona Bansal

== Production ==
The film was announced in July 2019, with lead cast of Sonam Bajwa, Mehreen Pirzada, Ninja and Ajay Sarkaria. It marked as Ajay Sarkaria's debut film.

== Release ==
The first look of the film was released on 17 September 2019. The official trailer of the film was released by White Hill Music on 19 September 2019. Dialogue promo was released on 4 October 2019.

The film was theatrically released on 18 October 2019.

== Soundtrack ==
Ardab Mutiyaran

Soundtrack album by Desi Crew, Jassi Katyal, Goldboy, Beat Minister, The Kidd, Gur Sidhu, Cheetah
- Released: 27 September 2019
- Recorded: 2019
- Genre: Feature film soundtrack
- Language: Punjabi
- Label: White Hill Music

The songs are composed by Desi Crew, Jassi Katyal, Goldboy, Beat Minister, The Kidd, Gur Sidhu and Cheetah on lyrics of Sidhu Moose Wala, Harmanjeet, Gur Sidhu, Sukh Sohal, Singa, Vicky Gill, Jassi Lokka, and Satta Vairowalia.

Track list
No.	Title	Lyrics	Music	Singer(s)	Length
1.	"Jatti Jeone Morh Wargi"	Sidhu Moose Wala	The Kidd	Sidhu Moose Wala	3:01
2.	"Challa"	Gur Sidhu	Gur Sidhu	Gur Sidhu & Harpi Gill	4:07
3.	"Vadde Vadde Din"	Harmanjeet	Cheetah	Manpreet	3:37
4.	"Jattan Naal Yaarane"	Satta Vairowala	Beat Minister	Gurshabad, Gulrez Akhtar	3:42
5.	"Ardab Mutiyaran (Title Track)"	Singga	Desi Crew	Singgaa	3:16
6.	"Tere Bin"	Sukh Sohal	Goldboy	Ninja	3:51
7.	"Thar Jatti Di"	Jassi Lokka, Vicky Gill	Jay K (Jassi Katyal)	Baani Sandhu	3:26

== Reception ==
=== Critical reception ===
Manpriya Singh of The Tribune praised the script as refreshing, having a good storyline and funny dialogues. Singh praised the performance of Bajwa, Ajay Sarkaria and the cameo by Navneet Nishan but concluded, "our Jatti [Bajwa] is loud and clear. This film belongs to her."
