= Jatt & Juliet =

2012 Indian film by Anurag Singh

- Theatrical release poster
- Directed by: Anurag Singh
- Screenplay by: Dheeraj Rattan
- Produced by: Darshan Singh Grewal; Gunbir Singh Sidhu
- Starring: Diljit Dosanjh; Neeru Bajwa
- Cinematography: Anshul Chobey
- Edited by: Manish More
- Music by: Jatinder Shah; Nick Dhammu
- Production companies: White Hill Studios; Grewalz Cine Corp.
- Distributed by: White Hill Studios; Speed Records
- Release date: 29 June 2012
- Country: India
- Language: Punjabi
- Box office: ₹24.84 crore

Jatt & Juliet is a 2012 Indian Punjabi-language romantic comedy film directed by Anurag Singh and produced by Darshan Singh Grewal and Gunbir Singh Sidhu. The film stars Diljit Dosanjh opposite Neeru Bajwa. It was released theatrically on 29 June 2012 and became a major commercial success at the box office, becoming the highest-grossing Punjabi film. It also won multiple awards at the PTC Punjabi Film Awards 2013 including for Best Film, Best Director, Best Actor and Best Actress.

The film spawned a sequel the following year titled Jatt & Juliet 2 featuring most of the same cast and crew, and was followed by another sequel, Jatt & Juliet 3, in 2024. Jatt & Juliet 2 also broke records at the box office, and again ended up becoming the highest-grossing Punjabi film.

It was remade in Bengali in 2014 as Bangali Babu English Mem.

== Plot ==
Fateh Singh, a Jat villager, is crazy about marrying a Canadian girl to get Canadian citizenship, while on the other side Pooja, a classy modern girl, wants to go to Canada to study fashion design. They both first meet at the passport office where Fateh seeks Pooja's help to fill out his form, pretending that his writing hand is injured, but in reality because he does not know English. They both again meet at the airport.

Pooja and Fateh often quarrel due to Fateh's lies. Pooja looks for a nice accommodation where she finds a nice house and while getting money out of the ATM, she is robbed by two thugs. Unfortunately, Pooja has to look for a cheaper place where she meets Fateh again and has to share that apartment with him.

A day arrives when Jenny, a Canadian Caucasian girl, arrives at the house where Pooja and Fateh are living as she is the step-daughter of the house owner. Pooja asks Fateh to propose to Jenny and they both start making plans how to get Jenny for Fateh, but when Fateh learns that Jenny is going to Africa for social service, he ditches her and poor Jenny is left heartbroken.

The owner of the house throws both of them out and they work at two different "Apna Chulha" restaurants that are run by a wife and husband, who are now separated. Fateh and Pooja soon discover that the Apna Chulha is going to be repossessed by the bank because of six unpaid property payments for the loan. Fateh and Pooja work out the process of reconciling the husband and wife so that the loan could be paid off. Slowly, Fateh and Pooja start falling for each other but both of them don't want to admit it. Fateh realises that he loves Pooja when Pooja's fiancé, Yuvraj comes to take Pooja with him to India for their marriage.

Finally Fateh leaves for India with a hope to bring Pooja back to his life but after watching Pooja has been married he is left heart broken. After a while, he meets Yuvraj who tells him about the split between him and Pooja and says that Pooja is still single and Fateh runs to propose Pooja and they live happily ever after.

== Cast ==
- Diljit Dosanjh as Fateh Singh
- Neeru Bajwa as Pooja
- Upasana Singh as Channo
- Jaswinder Bhalla as Joginder Singh
- Rana Ranbir as Shampy
- Sari Mercer as Jennifer (Jenny)
- Karamjit Anmol as Natha
- B.N. Sharma as Shampy's father
- Anita Kailey as Jaswinder (Jazzy)
- Amrinder Gill as Yuvraj Singh (guest appearance)
- Isha Rikhi as Twinkle, Yuvraj's wife
- Lakhwinder Sandhu as Bhola (Lakhwinder Singh)
- Balinder Johal as the Kathy (landlord)
- Anita Devgan as Fateh's mother
- Amrit Billa as Fateh's father
- Tarsem Paul as Pooja's father
- Sunita Dheer as Pooja's mother

== Soundtrack ==
=== Track listing ===
| Track | Song | Artist(s) | Lyrics | Music |
|---|---|---|---|---|
| 1 | "Fatto" | Diljit | Kumar | Jatinder Shah |
| 2 | "Hi Fi Juliet" | Diljit | Kumar | Jatinder Shah |
| 3 | "Kuriye Mind Na Karin" | Diljit | Veet Baljit | Jatinder Shah |
| 4 | "Challi Vangra Judai" | Sukhwinder Singh | Raj Kakra | Jatinder Shah |
| 5 | "Bachaa" | Diljit | Veet Baljit | Jatinder Shah |
| 6 | "Pooja Kiven Aa" | Sharry Mann | Sharry Mann | Nick Dhammu |
| 7 | "Main Jaagaan Swere" | Diljit Dosanjh | Jaggi Singh | Jatinder Shah |

== Box office ==
Jatt & Juliet collected ₹8 million on its first day in Punjab and ₹22.7 million in its opening weekend. It set a record for the first week box office by collecting of ₹47 million (Rs 43 million East Punjab + Rs 4 million Delhi/UP) and in its second weekend it collected Rs 20 million plus to become the highest grossing Punjabi film with a collection of Rs 67.5 million in just 10 days. After four weeks of release it grossed a total of ₹108 million from the East Punjab territory, which is the 3rd highest total in that territory in the history of Indian cinema, only behind Shah Rukh Khan's Ra.One and Don 2. The total 4-week collection for Jatt and Juliet in India was approximately ₹121 million and the film ultimately grossed an estimated ₹200 million throughout India.

== Sequels ==
In September 2012 it was announced that there would be a sequel to Jatt & Juliet, entitled simply Jatt & Juliet 2. It marked the first time a Punjabi film had a sequel made. The film was released on 28 June 2013 and featured much of the same cast, including of Diljit Dosanjh as Fateh Singh and Neeru Bajwa as Pooja and the crew of the first film. The theatrical trailer released on 23 May 2013. It broke all box office records and became the highest grossing Punjabi film at the time. The film received rave reviews from the critics as well.

Another sequel, Jatt & Juliet 3, starring Dosanjh and Bajwa released in 2024.

== Remakes ==
Himesh Reshammiya has purchased the Hindi remake rights of the movie.

In Bengali, it was remade into Bangali Babu English Mem, starring Soham Chakraborty and Mimi Chakraborty, was directed by Ravi Kinnagi and produced by Shree Venkatesh Films.

== 2013 PTC Punjabi Film Awards ==
Jatt & Juliet won seven awards at the PTC Punjabi Film Awards in 2013.

| Category | Winner's Name |
|---|---|
| Best Film | Darshan Pal Singh Grewal and Gunbir Singh Sidhu |
| Best Director | Anurag Singh |
| Best Actor | Diljit Dosanjh |
| Best Actress | Neeru Bajwa |
| Best Supporting Actress | Upasna Singh |
| Most Popular Song of the Year | Pooja Kiven Aa - Sharry Mann |
| Best Screenplay | Dheeraj Rattan |
