= PTC Punjabi Film Awards 2020 =

10th PTC Punjabi Film Awards
- Awarded for: excellence in Punjabi cinema
- Presented by: PTC Punjabi
- Presented on: May 29, 2020
- Date: July 3, 2020
- Hosted by: Gurpreet Ghuggi; Divya Dutta; Harish Verma; Gurnam Bhullar; Mandy Takhar (Note: Hosted curtain-raiser.)
- Official website: Official website

Highlights
- Best Film: Ardaas Karaan
- Best Film: Jury's choice: Guddiyan Patole
- Best Actor critics': Amrinder Gill; Chal Mera Putt
- Best Direction: Gippy Grewal; Ardaas Karaan
- Best Actor: Gurpreet Ghuggi & Diljit Dosanjh; Ardaas Karaan & Shadaa
- Best Actress: Sonam Bajwa; Ardab Mutiyaran
- Lifetime achievement: Priti Sapru
- Most awards: Ardaas Karaan (6)
- Most nominations: Sikander 2 (13)

Television coverage
- Channel: PTC Punjabi
- Network: PTC Network

The 10th PTC Punjabi Film Awards ceremony, presented by PTC Punjabi, honored the best Punjabi films of 2019, and was held online. It was the first time the award was held online, due to the COVID-19 pandemic. The curtain raiser for the awards was held on 29 May 2020 on PTC Punjabi. The award ceremony was online on 3 July 2020, and was hosted by Gurpreet Ghuggi, Divya Dutta, Harish Verma, and Gurnam Bhullar. Ardaas Karaan won the most six awards, including Best Film, Best Actor (for Ghuggi) and Best Director (for Gippy Grewal), followed by Chal Mera Putt, which won three awards including Best Comedy Film and Best Actor critics' (for Amrinder Gill).

== Winners and nominees ==
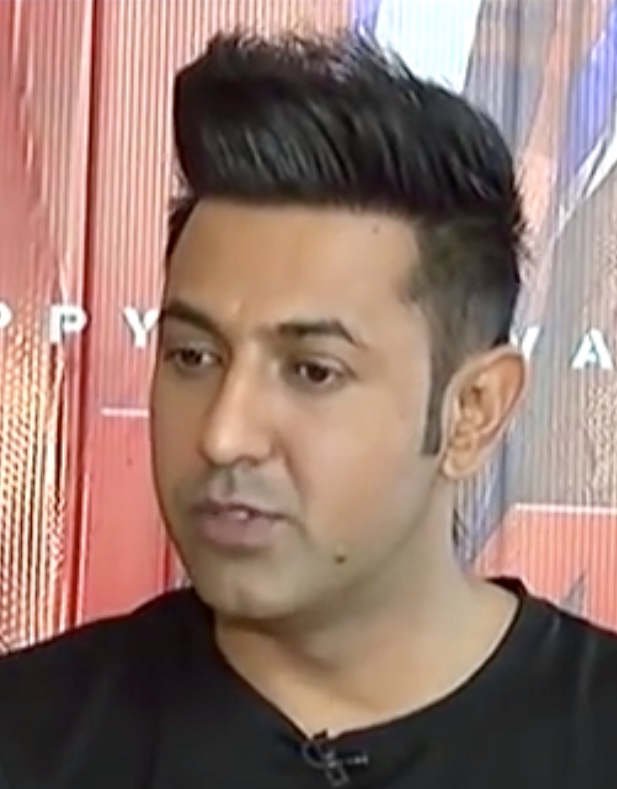
Gippy Grewal, Best Picture winner and Best Director winner

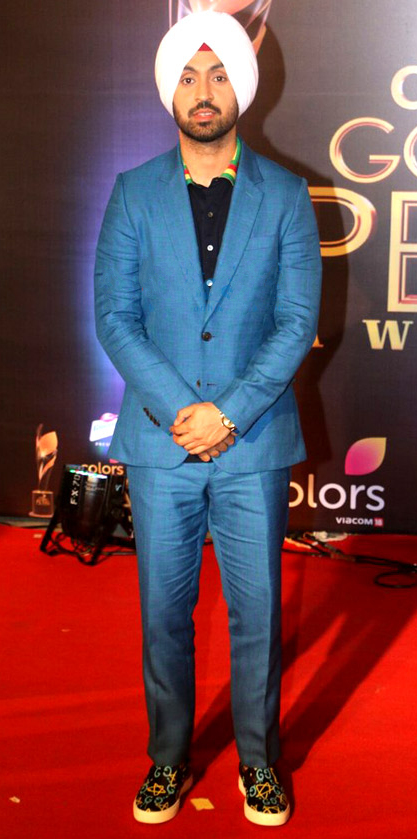
Diljit Dosanjh, Best Actor winner

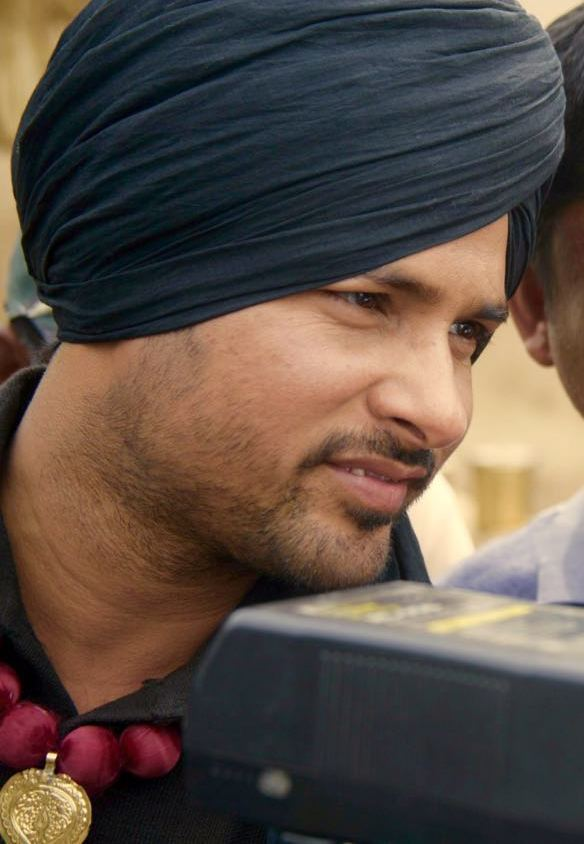
Amrinder Gill, Best Actor critics' winner

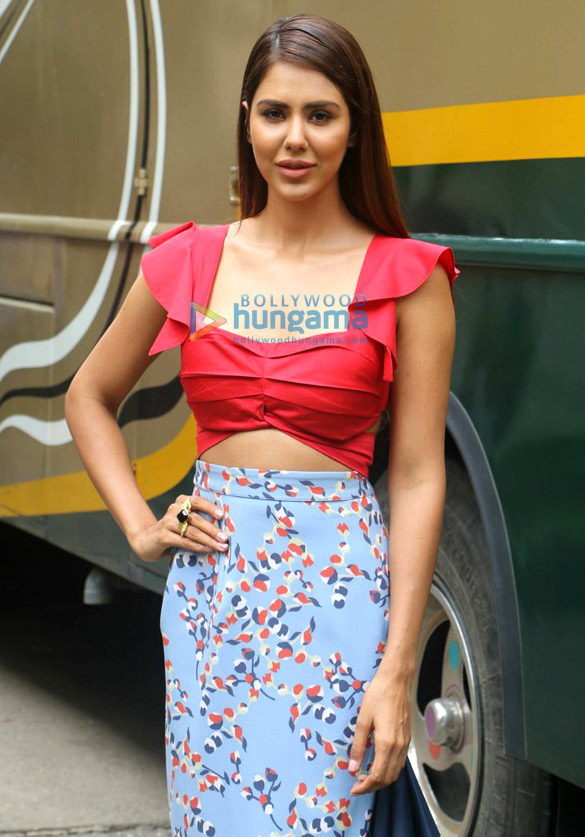
Sonam Bajwa, Best Actress winner

Winners are listed first, highlighted in boldface, and indicated with a double dagger (‡).

**Best Picture**: **Ardaas Karaan - Gippy Grewal**‡; Blackia - Sukhminder Dhanjal, Vivek Ohri and Atul Ohri; Dil Diyan Gallan - Parmish Verma, Uday Pratap Singh and Dinesh Auluck; Laiye Je Yaarian - Sukh Sanghera and Karaj Gill; Shadaa - Jagdeep Sidhu and Anurag Singh; Surkhi Bindi - Jagdeep Sidhu, Ankit Vijan, Navdeep Narula, Gurjit Singh and Santosh Subhash Thite; Muklawa - Simerjit Singh, Gunbir Singh Sidhu and Manmord Sidhu	**Best Comedy Film**: **Chal Mera Putt - Janjot Singh, Karaj Gill and Ashu Munish Sahni**‡; Ardab Mutiyaran - Manav Shah, Gunbir Singh Sidhu and Manmord Sidhu; Band Vaaje - Smeep Kang and Jatinder Shah; Gidarh Singhi - Vipin Parashar and Abhishek Tyagi; High End Yaariyaan - Pankaj Batra, Sandeep Bansal, Dinesh Auluck and Balwinder Kohli; Kala Shah Kala - Amarjit Singh, Harsimran Dhillon, Navaniat Singh, Achal Kaushal, Binnu Dhillon; Shadaa - Jagdeep Sidhu and Anurag Singh
**Best Director**: **Gippy Grewal - Ardaas Karaan**‡; Jagdeep Sidhu - Shadaa; Manav Shah - Sikander 2; Mandeep Benipal - DSP Dev; Pankaj Batra - High End Yaaiyaan; Simerjit Singh - Muklawa; Vijay Kumar Arora - Guddiyan Patole	**Best Actor**: **Diljit Dosanjh - Shadaa**‡; **Gurpreet Ghuggi - Ardaas Karaan**‡; Ammy Virk - Muklawa; Amrinder Gill - Laiye Je Yaarian; Binnu Dhillon - Jhalle; Dev Kharoud - Blackia; Gippy Grewal - Chandigarh Amritsar Chandigarh; Parmish Verma - Dil Diyan Gallan; Tarsem Jassar - Rabb Da Radio 2
**Best Actress**: **Sonam Bajwa - Ardab Mutiyaran**‡; Kavita Kaushik - Mindo Taseeldarni; Kulraj Randhawa - Naukar Vahuti Da; Roopi Gill - Laiye Je Yaarian; Sargun Mehta - Surkhi Bindi; Wamiqa Gabbi - Dil Diyan Gallan; Neeru Bajwa - Shadaa	**Best Supporting Actor**: **Pavan Malhotra - Jhalle**‡; Guggu Gill - Jaddi Sardar; Hardeep Gill - Shadaa; Hobby Dhaliwal - Doorbeen; Sanjeev Attri - Amaanat; Sardar Sohi - Mindo Taseeldarni; Yograj Singh - Teri Meri Jodi; Gurshabad - Chal Mera Putt
**Best Supporting Actress**: **Anita Devgan - Jaddi Sardar**‡; Ekta BP Singh - Blackia; Mannat Singh - Band Vaaje; Rupinder Rupi - Doorbeen; Satwant Kaur - Mitran Nu Shaunk Hathyaran Da; Upasana Singh - Jind Jaan	**Best Debut Director**: **Janjot Singh - Chal Mera Putt**‡; Amarjit Singh - Kala Shah Kala; Ishan Chopra - Doorbeen; Parmish Verma & Uday Pratap Singh - Dil Diyan Gallan; Sharan Art - Rabb Da Radio 2; Sukh Sanghera - Laiye Je Yaarian; Santosh Thite & Deepak Thaper - Munda Hi Chahida

== Films that received multiple awards and nominations ==
Films that received multiple awards
Awards	Film
6	Ardaas Karaan
3	Chal Mera Putt
3	Guddiyan Patole
2	Shadaa
2	Muklawa
2	Jhalle
2	Blackia
2	High End Yaariyaan

Films that received multiple nominations
Nominations	Film
13	Sikander 2
11	Ardaas Karaan
11	Dil Diyan Gallan
10	Shadaa
10	Muklawa
10	Blackia
8	High End Yaariyaan
8	Jhalle
7	Laiye Je Yaarian
7	Rabb Da Radio 2
7	Jaddi Sardar
6	Chal Mera Putt
6	Guddiyan Patole
6	Surkhi Bindi
6	DSP Dev
5	Chandigarh Amritsar Chandigarh
5	Ardab Mutiyaran
5	Gidarh Singhi
5	Mitran Nu Shaunk Hathyaran Da
4	Ishqaa
4	Band Vaaje
3	Jind Jaan
3	Yaara Ve
3	Kaake Da Viyah
3	Doorbeen
2	Manje Bistre 2
2	Munda Faridkotia
2	Saak
2	Lukan Michi
2	Mindo Taseeldarni
