= Bhajjo Veero Ve =

- Theatrical release poster
- Directed by: Amberdeep Singh
- Written by: Amberdeep Singh
- Screenplay by: Amberdeep Singh
- Produced by: Karaj Gill; Talwinder Hayre
- Starring: Amberdeep Singh; Simi Chahal; Guggu Gill; Nirmal Rishi; Hobby Dhaliwal
- Cinematography: Navneet Misser
- Edited by: Sadik Ali Shaikh
- Music by: Jatinder Shah
- Production company: Hayre Omjee Studios
- Distributed by: Omjee Group (India); Rhythm Boyz (Canada); Mind Blowing Films (Aus and NZ )
- Release dates: 14 December 2018 (Worldwide); 15 December 2018 (India)
- Running time: 110 minutes
- Country: India
- Language: Punjabi

Bhajjo Veero Ve (transl. Run brothers!) is a 2018 Indian Punjabi-language romantic comedy film written and directed by Amberdeep Singh. It is produced by Karaj Gill and Talwinder Hayre, and stars Singh, Simi Chahal, Nirmal Rishi, Guggu Gill and Hobby Dhaliwal. The film follows four unmarried men, three of which have given up all hope of getting married while the fourth, played by Singh, fall in love. In order to marry her, he had to find his long lost maternal family. The film is produced under the banner of Rhythm Boyz Entertainment in association with Hayre Omjee Studios.

Bhajjo Veero Ve is a period film about Punjabi culture, written by Singh, who had always wanted to work on such a film. The film was earlier titled as Car Reebna Waali. The film was announced in August 2018 with two other films and the principal photography began on 18 September 2018 in Amritsar and was also shot in Rajasthan; the film was wrapped on 26 October 2018. The production of the film was designed by Kazi Rafik Ali. The soundtrack of the film is composed by Jatinder Shah and features vocals from Amrinder Gill, Surinder Shinda, Gurshabad, Bir Singh, and Gurpreet Mann.

Bhajjo Veero Ve was released worldwide on 14 December 2018 except India where the film was released on 15 December 2018. Critically, the film's screenplay and dialogues and performances were praised with Gill getting most appreciated, while pace of the film was criticized.

== Premise ==
It's a tale of four unmarried men, out of which three have given up all hope of getting married, as they don't find themselves to be eligible enough. While the fourth guy, played by Amberdeep Singh, couldn't help but fall for the pretty lady, Simi Chahal. In order to marry her, Amberdeep Singh had to find his long lost maternal family and this is when the twist begins. Even after making all attempts to get acceptance from his maternal uncle, Amberdeep is seen running for his life.

== Cast ==
- Amberdeep Singh as Bhoora
- Simi Chahal as Sumeet
- Nirmal Rishi as Sumeet's grandmother
- Guggu Gill as Bhakhtawar Singh Bhoora's maternal uncle
- Hobby Dhaliwal as Sumeet's father
- Yaad Grewal as Yugraj
- Hardeep Gill as Lilla
- Balwinder Bullet as Bagga
- Sukhwinder Raj as Billu
- Jarnail Singh as postman

== Soundtrack ==
Bhajjo Veero Ve

Soundtrack album by Jatinder Shah
- Released: December 2018
- Recorded: 2018
- Genre: Feature film soundtrack
- Language: Punjabi
- Label: Rhythm Boyz Entertainment

Jatinder Shah chronology
Laatu (2018)	''Bhajjo Veero Ve'' (2018)	Kudiye Lahore Diye (2019)

The soundtrack and the background music of the film is composed by Jatinder Shah and releasing on record label Rhythm Boyz. Also, the film features vocals from Amrinder Gill, Surinder Shinda, Gurshabad, Bir Singh, and Gurpreet Mann whereas lyrics are penned by Bir Singh, Dev Thareekevala, Satta Vairowalia, Harmanjeet, and Ranjodh Singh. The film also features the song "Badla" sung by Surinder Shinda from the film Jatt Jeona Mour which was released in 1991 starring Guggu Gill in lead role. The songs "Khyaal" by Gurshabad and "Car Reebna Waali" by Amrinder Gill got critical acclaim.

=== Track List ===
No.	Title	Lyrics	Music	Singer(s)	Length
1.	"Khyaal"	Bir Singh	Jatinder Shah	Gurshabad	2:29
2.	"Badla"	Dev Thareekevala	Jatinder Shah	Surinder Shinda
3.	"Car Reebna Waali"	Satta Vairowalia	Jatinder Shah	Amrinder Gill	2:47
4.	"Chhade"	Satta Vairowalia	Jatinder Shah	Amrinder Gill
5.	"Chunni Cho Asmaan"	Bir Singh	Jatinder Shah	Bir Singh
6.	"Lehnga"	Harmanjeet	Jatinder Shah	Gurshabad
7.	"Din Akhri College De"	Ranjodh Singh	Jatinder Shah	Gurshabad
8.	"Bhajjo Veero Ve"	Satta Vairowalia	Jatinder Shah	Gurpreet Maan

== Production ==
Bhajjo Veero Ve was first announced in August 2018 with the title Car Reebna Waali alongside two other Rhythm Boyz films Harish Verma Starrer Untitled Film and Ashke 2 sequel to Ashke. In an interview Simi Chahal discloses that the film was titled "Bhajjo Veero Ve" by its first day it was only a technical issue of wrong title. Amberdeep said, "the film is titled for unmarried men of 1980s, as where they go are running away due to different reasons; Bhajjo Veero Ve simply refers to "Run Brothers!"." The principal photography of the film was started on 18 September 2018 in Amritsar where Navneet Misser served as cinematographer. Also, Kazi Rafik Ali served as production designer. Amberdeep Singh, Amrinder Gill, Karaj Gill, Gurshabad Singh and Bir Singh were present at the opening shot of the film.

Later, it was revealed that Simi Chahal would be the lead actress in the film. Also, there was news that Jordan Sandhu could play opposite her in a lead role. The film is the fourth collaboration of Simi Chahal with Rhythm Boyz Entertainment. The film was shot in Amritsar and some rural parts of Rajasthan. The film was wrapped on 26 October 2018.

== Release and marketing ==
On the occasion of Diwali and Bandi Chor Divas, Amberdeep Singh shared a picture from the set of the film and mentioned the film is to be retitled. The first look and the motion poster of the film were released on 12 November 2018 alongside its new title Bhajjo Veero Ve. The official trailer of the film was released on 28 November 2018 on Rhythm Boyz’s YouTube channel. Also, the trailer was liked by audience while critics appreciated the cast, soundtrack and the storyline of the film on the other hand missed Amrinder Gill. First song from the film "Khyaal" sung by Gurshabad was released on 3 December 2018. Second song of the film "Car Reebna Wali"(also film's previous title) sung by Amrinder Gill was released on 8 December 2018. On 12 December 2018, the title song "Bhajjo Veero Ve" sung by Gurpreet Maan followed by "Chhade" sung by Amrinder Gill on 13 December were released. On 14 December 2018, new posters with new Indian release date(as release date was changed from 14 December to 15 December) and "Lehnga" sung by Gurshabad were released.

Bhajjo Veero Ve was released worldwide on 14 December 2018 and distribution rights in India are acquired by Omjee Group, Mind Blowing Films in Australia and New Zealand, Rising Star Entertainment in Europe whereas the film is distributed in United States and Canada by Rhythm Boyz itself. British Board of Film Classification passed the film uncut of runtime 109 minutes 43 seconds. The film received the "12A" certificate due to moderate violence and threat. While in India, the film received "UA" certificate by Central Board of Film Certification and became the first "UA" rated film produced by Rhythm Boyz as all other films produced by the production house are "U" rated. The film is also released in Pakistan in 22 cinemas including 11 in Lahore. Rhythm Boyz's previous film Ashke wasn't released in Pakistan but was well received upon digital release on YouTube.

The film was released worldwide on 14 December 2018 but at last moments was postponed to 15 December in India due to some technical issues.

== Reception ==
=== Box office ===
Bhajjo Veero Ve has grossed ₹17.92 lacs in United States, ₹50.23 lacs in Canada, ₹7.36 lacs in United Kingdom and Ireland, ₹37.25 lacs in Australia and ₹7.87 lacs in New Zealand in its opening weekend.

According to Bollywood Hungama in 10 days, the film has grossed ₹2.5 crore at overseas including ₹27.9 in the United States, ₹1.29 crore in Canada, ₹11.03 lacs in the United Kingdom, ₹60.86 lacs in Australia and ₹12.65 lacs in New Zealand. Due to release of Bollywood film Zero in its next week the film underperformed in all territories except Canada and Australia. While in India shows were decreased by 70-80%.

=== Critical reception ===
Jasmine Singh of The Tribune praised the concept, dialogues, comedy and performance of entire cast in the film. While Singh criticised Amberdeep’s direction on other hand saying, "despite a fine concept, director Amberdeep Singh could not bind the subject well. It comes across as a film shot in haste. The film has a decent pace, but it lacks punch. Amberdeep is one director-actor who is known for his attention to the details, but this film is clearly missing his signature touch." Singh praised Gill’s performance most in the film, saying, "The most interesting character in Bhajjo Veero Ve is undoubtedly Gugu Gill. Gugu has a charisma and attitude, which the director has captured pretty well." She also praised the performances of Nirmal Rishi, Hobby Dhaliwal, and Hardeep Gill. She also praised the music by Jatinder Shah by calling it "robust".

Punjabi website Daah Films gave 3.5 stars out of 5. Reviewer praised the entire cast, saying, "All the characters have played their part very well and they have taken the story along them as they have built it very nicely" and also praised the story and screenplay by Amberdeep, says, "Story of the movie goes on very smoothly and it is presented in a natural way as it doesn’t carry any artificial element. Scenes are very simple and natural also they deliver us comedy which is situational [...] Bhajjo Veero Ve movie do built the emotions along. It carries little elements which contains deep messages." In last also praised the production work, said, "Technically movie is very strong and team has worked really hard on Direction, Screenplay, Cinematography, Graphics and Art Direction. The era of old times is depicted very beautifully in the movie. Concept of the movie is different and also presented in a good way."

Dixit Bhargav of Punjabi Mania gave 4 stars out of 5. Again the reviewer praised the screenplay and dialogues, consensus reads, "The screenplay of the movie is tightly written and gives clear impression of being derived from the Amberdeep Singh School of Writing. In which is the same case for dialogues, one wonders as to how he adds so much to fresh pieces each time round." She praised the performances of Amberdeep and Simi Chahal described "impressive" also praised Gill, said, "It is worth mentioning that Guggu Gill steals the show in Bhajjo Veero Ve. The veteran is seen in a class of his own when it comes to acting in the movie." Bhargav also praised the music of the film by Jatinder Shah, and songs "Car Reebna Wali" by Amrinder Gill and "Khyaal" by Gurshabad.

Gurlove Singh of BookMyShow also praised the storyline and dialogues by Amberdeep, consensus reads, "The writer wastes no time and comes straight to the point by showcasing the plight of each unmarried brother. The dialogues, although in abundance about being bachelors, do not get monotonous and each instance brings a smile to your face." Singh praised Gill's performance and described as "nostalgic" as it takes back to films in the 1980s. He also praised performances of Amberdeep, Chahal and Hardeep Gill. While also criticized the second half, said, "The second half is not at par with the first one. The story takes a backseat and the makers tend to push too many funny sequences into the second hour of the film." In last added, "Bhajjo Veero Ve is entertaining and a well-made film. The funny dialogues between the brothers and the tussle between Amberdeep and Guggu Gill keep the viewers’ interest alive throughout the film. Amberdeep’s fine act and one of Hardeep Gill’s best performance till date."
