= Punjabi cinema =

- No. of screens: 500+
- Main distributors: Omjee Group; Studio 7 Production; Rhythm Boyz; Villagers Film Studio; PTC Motion Pictures; White Hill Studios

Produced feature films (2022)
- Total: 1000+ Films (Theatrical)

Gross box office
- Total: 1200 Cr+

Punjabi cinema, also known as Pollywood or Punjwood, is cinema dedicated to the production of motion pictures in the Punjabi-language widely spoken in the Indian state of Punjab. It is based in Amritsar, Ludhiana, and Mohali.

Punjabi cinema began with the 1928 silent film of Daughters of Today, produced in the region in Lahore. In 1932, the first sound film, Heer Ranjha, using sound-on-disc technology, was released. 2,377 short-films and 117 feature-films were produced in Punjabi by 1989.

== History ==
=== Silent Era (1920's) ===
In 1924, the first Punjabi film, Daughters of Today, was released in Lahore; the city had nine operational cinema houses. Movies shown at these cinemas were mostly produced in Bombay and Calcutta, and seldom from Hollywood and London. Daughters of Today was a brainchild of G.K. Mehta, a former officer with the North-Western Railways who, much like H. S. Bhatavdekar, had imported a camera into the country. Mehta continued to produce newsreel coverage for companies abroad and delved into further film projects but his dedication gave way when he promptly left the film industry for more profitable ventures.

In 1928, alongside Muhammad Ismail, Abdur Rashid Kardar who previously worked with Mehta, started a studio and production company under the name United Players Corporation after having sold all his belongings. Set up at Ravi Road (now Timber Market), the duo hired actors to work with them on their projects. Shooting was mainly done in daylight and limited their productivity, but the area they encompassed was enriched with locations, including important landmarks. Actors who worked for the studio included Hiralal, Gul Hamid, Nazir, Pran Sikhand, Kaushalya Devi, Gulzaar, Mumtaaz and Ahmed Deen.

Later, in 1929, Kardar made his directorial debut with the release of Husn Ka Daku, which led to him being inducted into the director's guild. Through this film, the Punjabi film industry had established in essence in Lahore's Bhati Gate locality. Kardar, a professional calligraphist, was accompanied by his friend Ismail, hwho would make the posters for his films.

=== Advent of sound films (1930s–1946) ===
In 1932, Heer Ranjha, originally titled Hoor Punjab, was the first Punjabi sound film ever made. It was produced by Hakim Ram Prasad(formerly, United Players Corporation). This was the last film directed by Kardar in Lahore, starring M. Ismail while launching the careers of Rafiq Ghaznavi, Nazeer and Anwari.

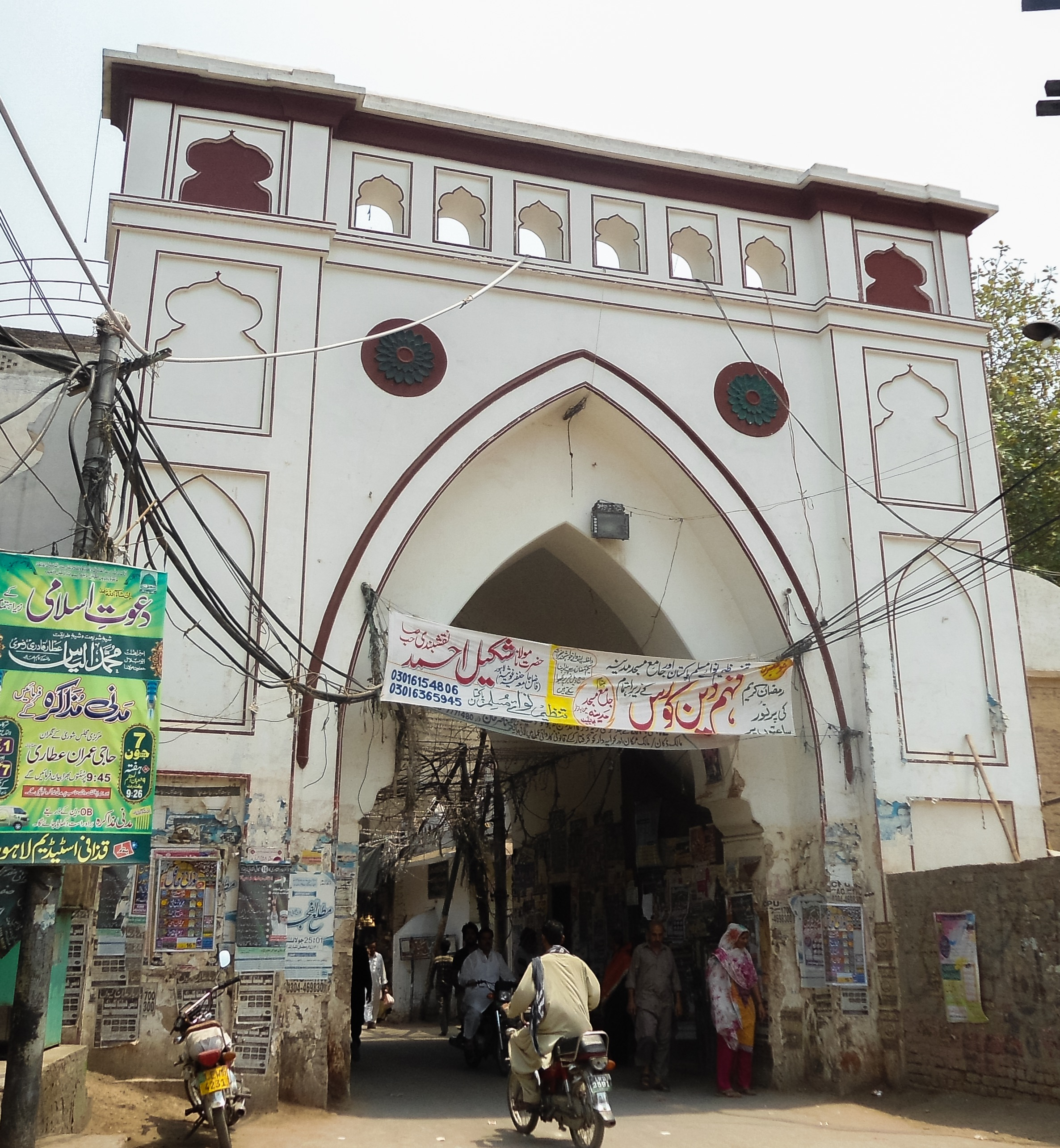
The façade of Bhati Gate

In 1935, produced by Indira Movie Tone, Krishna Dev Mehra released his directorial début, Pind Di Kudi. It was produced in Calcutta and released in Lahore; it debuted Noor Jahan as an actor and a playback singer. Due to the success of this film, interest in Punjabi films started to escalate; therefore, in 1938, with the assistance of Madan Mohan Mehra, K.D. Mehra released his second Punjabi sound film, Heer Sial.

Many actors, filmmakers and technicians shifted from Bombay and Calcutta to Lahore as studios started to open. Prominent names, included: Shanta Apte, Motilal, Chandra Mohan, Hiralal, Noor Jehan, Mumtaz Shanti, Wali, Syed Attahullah Shah Hashmi, Krishna Kumar, and Shanker Hussain. Baldev Raj Chopra, later known as a director, started from the Punjabi film industry in Lahore, where he operated a film magazine called the Cine Herald. Likewise, Ramanand Sagar, later a director, was associated with the Evening News and Syed Attahullah Shah Hashmi worked for the film newspaper, Adakar.

Bhati Gate is known to have produced some of most notable actors, writers and artists, but with tensions running swift towards the independence of Pakistan and India in 1947, most of the actors travelled into areas that are now a part of modern India. The industry left in Lahore would later be termed as Lollywood, a portmanteau of Lahore and Hollywood.

=== Post-partition (1947-49) ===
In 1947, the British Indian province of Punjab was partitioned between Pakistan and India, into what is referred to as, West & East Punjab respectively. Following partition, the newly-Eastern Punjabi actors, filmmakers and musicians were compelled to work in the Bombay industry, including actors, such as: K.L. Saigal, Prithviraj Kapoor, Dilip Kumar and Dev Anand and singers such as Mohammed Rafi, Noorjahan and Shamshad Begum. In 1948, Roop K. Shorey directed the first Punjabi film following the partition of Punjab. Other notable films of the late 1940s include: Lachhi (1949), Mundri (1949) and Pheray (1949).

=== 1950s–1960s ===
Punjabi cinema faced a decline in this period; films like Posti, Do Lachhian and Bhangra had some success, but were not able to revive Punjabi cinema. A long-term audience for these films came as a result of their soundtrack being listened to by audiences years after the films were released.

During this period, the ongoing trend of comedies continued. A hit comedy was Mulkh Raj Bhakhri's Bhangra (1958), starring Sundar and Nishi. It was remade by director Mohan Bhakhri as Jatti in 1980 with Mehar Mittal and Aparna Chowdhry, and it was again a commercial success. The music from the film was by Hansraj Behl with lyrics by Verma Malik.

In 1964, the romantic film Satluj De Kande, was released; this was the only Punjabi film starring Balraj Sahni. It was a major hit earning a National Film Award and was telecasted thrice on the public TV channel Doordarshan in India.

In 1969, the religious film Nanak Nam Jahaz Hai was released. The film was the first successful Punjabi film in post-independent India, with a major cultural impact on Punjabi Sikhs at home and abroad, and is credited with the revival of the Punjabi film industry in India. People stood in kilometre-long lines to buy a ticket for the film.

=== 1970s ===
After the success of Nanak Nam Jahaz Hai, films were released in huge numbers. Hindi actors of Punjabi descent became interested in Punjabi films. Kankan De Ohle and Nanak Dukhiya Sab Sansar were released in 1970.

1971 saw no major releases.

In 1972, Dara Singh starred with Prithviraj Kapoor in Mele Mitran De. In 1973, Man Jeete Jag Jeet, a religious film starring Sunil Dutt, Radha Saluja and Ranjeet released.

In 1974, Do Sher, Bhagat Dhanna Jatt (Dara Singh and Feroz Khan), Sacha Mera Roop Hai (Manmohan Krishan) and Dukh Bhanjan Tera Naam (Shaminder Singh and Radha Saluja) were released. The most successful was Dukh Bhanjan Tera Naam, due to the wide appeal of its religious historical setting and appearances by prominent Bollywood actors.

Teri Meri Ik Jindri (1975) starred Dharmendra and introduced his cousin Veerendra.

Many films were released in 1976: Daaj, Giddha, Main Papi Tum Bakhshanhaar, Papi Tarey Anek, Santo Banto, Sardar-E-Azam, Sawa Lakh Se Ek Ladaun, Taakra, and Yamla Jatt. Sawa Lakh Se Ek Ladaun was the biggest hit and starred Dara Singh in the main lead; Rajesh Khanna made a special appearance as the Qawal. The film ran into conflict with the Sikh political parties as the film had Fauj-i-Khas soldiers wearing fake beards.

1977 was not a major year for the Punjabi film industry. Jai Mata Di, Saal Solvan Chadya, Sat Sri Akal, and Shaheed Kartar Singh Sarabha were released, amongst others. Saal Solvan Chadya was a highlight because of the cameo appearance by Rekha. Sat Sri Akal was another hit film. It starred Sunil Dutt, Shatrughan Sinha, and Premnath.

In 1978, Udeekan, Dhyani Bhagat, Jai Mata Sheranwali, and Jindri Yar Di were released. The drama Udeekan was a hit. Walayati Babu, the first ever remake in Punjabi cinema, was released in 1978. The film was remade from the Punjabi film of the same name by Johnny Walker; it featured a special appearance by Amitabh Bachchan and Mehar Mittal played the main lead.

1979 was a big year: Guru Manio Granth, Jatt Punjabi, Kunwara Mama, Sukhi Pariwar, and Til Til Dalekha were released. The religious film Guru Manio Granth was an instant hit. Jatt Punjabi had a big cast and a special appearance by Manoj Kumar. Til Til Da Lekha starred Rajesh Khanna as the main lead hero and Mehar Mittal played the comedian's role; the film became a golden jubilee hit at the box office. Til Til Dalekha was the second Punjabi movie of Rajesh Khanna and his first film as the lead hero in Punjabi films. It won the Punjab State Government award for best story writer and second best feature film of 1979. The first Punjabi mystery film, Vangaar (The Challenge), was released but it failed to become a hit.

=== 1980s ===
In 1980, Chann Pardesi, the first Punjabi film to win the national award, was released. Fauji Chacha had veteran Bollywood actor Sanjeev Kumar in the lead.

1981 had only one hit: Balbiro Bhabhi. This film had Veerendra in the lead role.

Two major releases of 1982 were Jatt Da Gandasa and Sarpanch which starred Veerendra.

In 1983, many movies were released, with Putt Jattan De being the biggest commercially.

Veerendra had another hit in 1984 with the film Yaari Jatt Di. This was the first Punjabi film to have more than half its footage shot in the United Kingdom. Mamla Garbar Hai was a hit for actor Gurdas Mann. The film's songs were especially loved.

Two hit films of 1985 were Mohammad Sadiq's Guddo and Veerendra's Vairi. Ucha Dar Babe Nanak Da, was a religious film that established Gurdas Mann as a star.. Long Da Lishkara was the big hit of 1986, starring Raj Babbar, Gurdas Mann, Om Puri, and Nina Deol.

In 1987, Veerendra starred in Patola and Jor Jatt Da. Punjab was shaken with the assassination of Veerendra by gunshot during the filming of Jatt Tey Zameen. The death opened the door for supporting actors including Guggu Gill and Yograj Singh to take leading roles.

1988 had Patola as a major release.

In 1989, the critically acclaimed Marhi Da Deeva released.

=== 1990s ===
In 1990, Qurbani Jatt Di was released, directed by Preeti Sapru, and did well at the box office. Another important release was Dushmani Di Agg, the last film of Veerendra.

In 1991, the major film Anakh Jattan Di starred Daljeet Kaur and Guggu Gill. It was the first movie where the audience really accepted ex-villain Guggu Gill as a hero. The film was followed by films like Jor Jatt Da, which managed to recover its cost. Badla Jatti Da was the major success of the year. It starred Guggu Gill, Yograj Singh in a villain role, and Aman Noorie. Udeekan Saun Diyan garnered critical acclaim, but was not a commercial success. Sounh Menoo Punjab Di, starring Satish Kaul, Rama Vij, Mehar Mittal, and Pal Randhawa released. The film was directed by Sukhdev Ahluwalia, one of the most successful directors of Punjwood, and had music by Surinder Kohli. Vaisakhi, starring Deep Dhillon and Sunita Dheer, was released in 1991 to critical acclaim, but did not succeed commercially. Jatt Jeona Morh was a major hit that year, and made Guggu Gill a superstar. Also released was Yograj Singh's Jagga Daku (1991), which did moderately well. Dil Da Mamla, starring Guggu Gill and Amar Noori, did poorly at the box office.

1993 had films like Jatt Sucha Singh Soorma (with Yograj Singh and Neena Sidhu), Mirza Sahiban (starring Guggu Gill), Lalkara Jatt Da, and Saali Adhi Gharwali. These films managed to do adequately at the box office, but were not major successes. Preeti Sapru's Mehndi Shagnan Di, starring Malkit Singh, Hansraj Hans, Preeti Sapru, and Yograj Singh, lost money. Kudi Canada Di starring Yograj Singh also did poorly.

Kachehri (1994) starred Gurdas Mann, Yograj Singh, and others. The film was praised by critics, was a commercial success, and won a national award. A second release was Tabahi, starring newcomer Vishal Singh; it was the blockbuster hit of the year. Guggu Gill's Vairi did quite well at the box office, but Jigra Jatt Da, with Yograj Singh as the villain, did poorly at the box office.

Kimi Verma starred in Naseebo and Qahar in 1995 to critical acclaim, but not commercial success. Naseebo managed to recover its costs. Pratigya, starring Guggu Gill, Gurdas Maan, Preeti Sapru, and Dara Singh, did well at the box office. Zaildaar (Yograj Singh), Nain Preeto De (Yograj Singh), and Sir Dhad Di Baazi did well. Gurdas Mann's Baghawat did not. Jakhmi Jagirdar and Mera Punjab amongst others also did poorly that year.

Punjabi cinema began to decline in 1996. Only the film Sukha (starring Vishal Singh) did well at the box office. Deson Pardeson, Dhee Jatt Di (Upasana Singh, Gurkirtan, and Shivinder Mahal), Vichoda (Yograj Singh), Gawahi Jatt Di, and Jorawar all did poorly at the box office. Dara Singh's Vindoo and Farha's Rabb Diyan Rakhan also fared poorly.

Films of 1997 (Mela, Truck Driver, Sardari, Preetan De Pehredaar, and Pachtaawa) all failed to make a profit. Even Guggu Gill's films were not successful. Train to Pakistan was filmed in a mixture of Hindi and Punjabi, and was later dubbed into Punjabi for film festivals.

In 1998, Purja Purja Kat Mare with Guggu Gill, Laali with Dara Singh, Ravinder Maan, and Vishal, and Dildaara with Kalbhooshan Kharbanda and Tanuja did not make money. Even big budget films like Guru Gobind Singh did poorly. The critically acclaimed film Main Maa Punjab Dee (directed by Balwant Dullat) won a National Award. The film Main Maa Punjab dee has been shown repeatedly on national television. The year ended on a positive note as Jaspal Bhatti's Mahaul Theek Hai became an instant hit of Punjabi cinema. It was the first big hit since Jatt Jeona Morh (1991) and Badla Jatti Da (1992).

Punjabi films were more successful in 1999. Mahaul Theek Hai, Shaheed-e-Mohabbat Boota Singh with Gurdas Maan and Divya Dutta was a critical and commercial success. Muqqadar, Tera Mera Pyar, Nadiyon Vichde Neer, Door Nahin Nankana, and Ishq Nachave Gali Gali (Randeep Virender, Manjeet Kullar, Deepak Saraf, Neeru Singh, and Surinder Sharma) all did poorly at the box office. Rajniti, which was also made in Hindi, failed to make money. Raj Babbar's Shaheed Udham Singh did well towards the end of the year. There were only two major hits that year, Shaheed e Mohabbat and Shaheed Udham Singh.

=== 2000s ===
In 2000, there was only a single release: Dard Pardesan De, starring Avinash Wadhawan, Upasana Singh, Paramveer, and Deepshikha, which fared poorly in Punjab, but did very well overseas.

Sikandra and Jagira were released in 2001. Avinash Wadhawan and Ayesha Jhulka starred in Khalsa Mero Roop Hai Khaas, which only saw an international release.

In 2002, Jee Ayan Nu was released, featuring singer-turned-actor Harbhajan Mann and directed by Manmohan Singh. The movie was made on a big budget for Pollywood– 9 million, as compared to the more typical 20–25 million. It was very successful. This was a turning point in the revival of Punjabi cinema.

Badla came out in 2003.

In 2004, Asa Nu Maan Watna Da was released, again with actor Harbhajan Mann and director Manmohan Singh.

Jija Ji, Des Hoyaa Pardes, Main Tu Assi Tussi, Yaaran Naal Baharan, and Nalaik were released in 2005.

In 2006, Dil Apna Punjabi (again pairing Harbhajan and director Manmohan), Ek Jind Ek Jaan (introducing Prabhleen Sandhu), Mannat (directed and written by Gurbir Singh Grewal, having Jimmy Sheirgill and introducing Kulraj Randhawa), and Waris Shah: Ishq Daa Waaris released. Kambdi Kalai, a Punjabi diaspora movie based out of the United States, came out in 2006. Mehndi Wale Hath (2006), written and directed by Harinder Gill and with the new-star cast of Goldie Somal, Gavie Chahal, and Prableen, was a hit film in east Punjab territory.

Rustam-e-Hind and Mitti Wajan Mardi (with Harbhajan and Manmohan) were released in 2007.

A significant number of movies were produced in 2008: Hashar: A Love Story (introducing Gurleen Chopra), Yaariyan, Mera Pind, Lakh pardesi hoye, Heaven on earth, and Sat sri akal. In 2009, Jag Jeodeye Deh Mele became a hit, and Tera Mera Ki Rishta with Jimmy Shergill and Kulraj Randhawa was a hit. But the biggest earner of all the Punjabi films was Manmohan Singh's Munde UK De with Jimmy Shergill and Gurpreet Ghuggi.

Munde UK De broke the record of Dil Apna Punjabi which was also directed by Manmohan Singh and became the biggest earner of all the Punjabi movies.

=== 2010s ===
In 2010, 16 movies were released. Mel Karade Rabba starring Jimmy Shergill, Gippy Grewal later broke all records and grossed 110 million net, becoming the highest-grossing Punjabi film ever. Babbu Maan's Ekam – Son of Soil was released in April and was a smash hit. It brought British-Punjabi actress Mandy Takhar to the industry. Jawani Zindabad, written and directed by Harinder Gill and starring the famous Punjabi singer Raj Barar, Pooja Kanwal, Guggu Gill, and Gurkirtan, was released in March 2010. It became a big hit in Canada. Channa Sachi Muchi, written and directed by Harinder Gill and starring Miss Pooja and Goldie Somal, was released in August 2010. Also released in 2010 was Sukhmani (Hope for Life), starring Gurdas Maan, Juhi Chawla and Divya Dutta.

==== 2011 ====
In 2011, the film Ek Noor starring Harshdeep Kaur and Yami Gautam was released. Chhevan Dariya (The Sixth River), directed by Ish Amitoj Kaur, was released in September 2011. Kaur was the first Punjabi woman to have directed, produced, and written a Punjabi film. The film starred Gulshan Grover, Neena Gupta, Manpreet Singh, Lakhwinder Wadali, Christa Cannon and Rana Ranbir. At the end of the year, Chak Jawana was released, directed by Simerjit Singh and starring Gurdas Maan, Jonita Doda in the Lead Roles.

In February, PTC Punjabi organised the first ever PTC Punjabi Film Awards at Panchkula. It was a tremendous boost to the industry and was attended by the likes of Om Puri, Prem Chopra, Gurdas Maan, Guddu Dhanoa, Preeti Sapru, Raza Murad, Satish Kaul, Manmohan Singh, Amrinder Gill, Gippy Grewal, Jasbir Jassi, Puneet Issar, Rakesh Bedi, Rama Vij, Sudhanshu Pandey, and Akriti Kakkar.

2011 looks to be the year when the industry moves away from the "typical NRI-centered" storylines and towards more meaningful and creative storylines with movies like The Lion of Punjab starring Diljit Dosanjh and Dharti starring Rannvijay Singh.

Jihne Mera Dil Luteya is a 2011 Punjabi film directed by Mandeep Kumar with story and screenplay by Dheeraj Rattan, produced by Batra Showbiz Pvt. Ltd. and starring Gippy Grewal, Diljit Dosanjh, Neeru Bajwa, and Jaswinder Bhalla. It grossed 125 million.

In September, Yaara o Dildaara released, directed by Ksshitij Chaudhary and starring Harbhajan Mann, Jonita Doda, Tulip Joshi, Kabir Bedi, and Gurpreet Ghuggi.

In October, Yaar Annmulle introducing Yuvraj Hans and Harish Verma was released.

==== 2012 ====
This year was the considered as the golden year of Punjabi cinema and industry reached many milestones in this year by having all India impact. There was the release of Hollywood-style film Mirza – The Untold Story the most costly film (₹90 million (US$930,000)) in the history of Punjabi cinema in April starring Gippy Grewal and Yo Yo Honey Singh. In June the film Jatt & Juliet was greatest blockbuster and till now holds the title of best ever film of Punjabi cinema. This film established Diljit Dosanjh and Neeru Bajwa as superstars of Punjabi film industry. Himesh Reshammiya has purchased the remake rights of the movie for ₹35 million (US$360,000). In July 2012 out and out comedy film Carry On Jatta starring Gippy Grewal was also blockbuster only after Jatt & Juliet commercially. First time in punjabi cinema sequel of sperhit film Yaaran Naal Baharan, film Yaraan Naal Baharaan 2 was released.

In September, Ajj De Ranjhe starring Deep Dhillon and Kul Sidhu was released. It was directed by Man ji. In October 2012, Saadi Wakhri Hai Shaan, directed by Gurbir Grewal, was released. The film featured eight songs, which were composed by debut music director Dilpreet Bhatia. The film's music was a contemporary fusion of western classical and Punjabi folk music.

This year many new Production houses started the production of many comedy movies. Binnu Dhillon, Gurpreet Ghuggi, Jaswinder Bhalla, Rana Ranbir, Karamjit Anmol and B.N. Sharma established themselves as great comedians of Punjabi industry.

In August 2012, the first ever Punjabi International Film Academy Awards were organised in Toronto, Canada. This was a tremendous success, attended by a host of Punjabi stars. With renewed interest from the public, Punjabi cinema has seen a revival with more releases every year featuring bigger budgets, homegrown stars, and Bollywood actors of Punjabi descent taking part. Also there are film festivals like Punjabi Film Festival, Amritsar, Ma Boli International Punjabi Film Festival, Vancouver and Punjabi International Film Festival, Toronto held annually.

==== 2013 ====
2013 carried the Golden phase of Punjabi movies to the next level. Superstars Gippy Grewal, Neeru Bajwa, Diljit Dosanjh and Surveen Chawla stole the hearts of audiences by their successful films this year. Jatt & Juliet 2 broke the records of its prequel Jatt & Juliet. Jatt & Juliet 2 was also released in Pakistani Punjab in over 15 screens and was greatly liked by Pakistani audiences.

Sadda Haq, a true story based in the late 1980s and early 1990s during a period of extreme turmoil in Punjab was the second blockbuster of the year 2013 only after Jatt & Juliet 2. Bhaji in Problem starring Gippy Grewal was another blockbuster of the year produced by Akshay Kumar and also having his extended appearance along with cricketer Harbhajan Singh. Other hit films were Jimmy Shergill's Saadi Love Story starring Diljit Dosanjh, Fer Mamla Gadbad Gadbad starring Roshan Prince and Japji Khaira, Jatts in Golmaal starring Arya Babbar and Samiksha, Tu Mera 22 Main Tera 22 starring Yo Yo Honey Singh and superstar Gippy Grewal's Lucky Di Unlucky Story and action flick Singh vs Kaur. A religious film, Pagri Singh Da Taaj, was also released.

The Hollywood blockbuster A Good Day to Die Hard dubbed in Punjabi with superstar Gippy Grewal's voice was released in Punjab.

Many meaningful films based on social issues and the reality of Punjab were also successful like National Award winner Nabar, Stupid 7 based on student life in Punjab, Chandigarh student politics based Sikander, Sadda Haq, corruption and social issues based Bikkar Bai Sentimental, religious film Dastaar, Punjab Bolda, Haani, and Dil Pardesi Ho Gaya.

This year also saw the production of the first Punjabi 3D feature film, Pehchaan 3D, produced and directed by Manny Parmar.

Irrfan Khan starrer Qissa won four awards in Indian International Film Festival of Queensland of best actor award for Irrfan, best actress award for Tillotama Shome, best director award for Anup Singh and best cinematography for Sebastian Edschmid.

==== 2014 ====
In year 2014, around 42 films were released and nearly 80 per cent of those films were all slapstick comedies. Most successful films of the year were blockbusters like Chaar Sahibzaade(3D), Gippy Grewal's Jatt James Bond, Disco Singh, Double Di Trouble, Diljit Dosanjh's Punjab 1984, Mr & Mrs 420, Goreya Nu Daffa Karo. In This year many Action Films were released like Kirpaan: The Sword of Honour, Fateh, Romeo Ranjha, Yoddha The Warrior (2014 film) and Baaz. Released in January, Patiala Dreamz was a romantic thriller, with right doses of action, suspense, romance and comedy. There were many movies touching 1984 subject such as Punjab 1984, Kaum De Heere, 47 to 84 Hun Main Kisnu Watan Kahunga. Other films released in this year were Aa Gaye Munde UK De starring Jimmy Shergill and Neeru Bajwa, Mundeyan Ton Bachke Rahin starring Jassi Gill, Roshan Prince and Simran Kaur Mundi, Dil Vil Pyaar Vyaar starring Gurdas Mann and Neeru Bajwa, "Cross Connection" Released on 26 December, Produced by jasbir Dhillon (Dhillon Creations) Starring: B.N. Sharma, Upasna singh, Garry warraich, Nancy johal, Gurchet chitarkar, Parkash gadhu, Dilawar sidhu, Malkeet raouny, Anita shabdeesh, Sahib singh, Raman Dhillon, Rozy, Tarsem paul with renowned singers Rahat fateh ali khan, Arif Lohar, Kamal khan, Navraj hans, Mank-e, Tochi raina.

Also this year, many notable actors and singers debuted in Punjabi cinema, this year notably veteran actors Dharmendra and Poonam Dhillon in Double Di Trouble, famous Bollywood comedian Razak Khan in Marriage da garriage, Bollywood actress Zarine Khan in Jatt James Bond, singer Garry Sandhu in Romeo Ranjha.

Chaar Sahibzaade was the first Punjabi 3D animated historical drama. It was a blockbuster, grossing over ₹700 million (US$7.3 million) globally and was made tax free by governments of states like Madhya Pradesh, Delhi, Punjab, Uttrakhand, Uttar Pradesh.

The Canadian-Punjabi feature film Work Weather Wife represented Canada at the 87th Oscar Awards (87th Academy Awards) and it was the only Canadian film that made the final shortlist of 79 Best Original Songs with its songs Moon and Long Braid. At 72nd Golden Globe Awards for Best Foreign Language Feature Film and made the top 53 films in the long list. It stars Harpreet Sandhu and Reema Nagra in the lead role with Dilbag Brar and Kirat Bhattal. It is directed by Harpreet Sandhu.

==== 2015 ====
The year 2015 was attributed to a few directors who took the risk of taking up different subjects with some fresh stories and some fresh actors and villains.

Blockbusters included: Sardaar Ji that achieved ₹500 million and Angrej that was a love story set in 1945 rural Punjab.

Punjabi films with a strong storyline and an equally strong direction were Shareek (directed by Navaniat Singh, starring Jimmy Shergill and Mahie Gill), Qissa Panjab (directed by Jatinder Mauhar that weaved in seven different stories into one), Judge Singh LLB (directed by Atharv Baluja as the first Punjabi courtroom drama), Gippy Grewal's Faraar (directed by Baljit Singh Deo brought in double role with suspense) was the highest budget film with ₹130 million (US$1.3 million) in the history of Punjabi cinema.

Other flop films were Dildariyaan, Mitti Na Pharol Jogiya, Oh Yaara Ainvayi Ainvayi Lut Gaya, Munde Kamaal De. While films raking up controversy or inviting a ban were The Mastermind Jinda Sukha and Pata Pata Singhan Da Vairi and Nanak Shah Fakir (Temporarily that faced a ban in some parts of the country).

==== 2016 ====
In 2016, as many as 41 movies were released. The larger commercial successes were: Ambarsariya, Sardaar Ji 2, Love Punjab, Vaisakhi List, Channo Kamli Yaar Di, Kaptaan, Saadey CM Saab, Bambukat, Chauthi Koot, Nikka Zaildar.

==== 2017 ====
In the first half of 2017, new concepts and excellent content paid dividends.

The larger commercial successes were: Super Singh, Manje Bistre, Jindua, Lahoriye, Sargi, Saab Bahadar, Sarvann, Rabb Da Radio and The Great Sardaar.

In the second half of the year, some commercial hits were: Channa Mereya, Sardar Mohammad, Nikka Zaildar 2 and Vekh Baraatan Challiyan.

==== 2018 ====
This year, the first Punjabi movie war film, Sajjan Singh Rangroot, set during World War I and starring Diljit Dosanjh, was released.

Carry On Jatta 2 was another blockbuster and one of the highest grossing Punjabi movies of all time.

Other commercially successful movies included: Golak Bugni Bank Te Batua, Ashke, Laung Laachi and Laavan Phere.

==== 2019 ====
This year, a total 61 Punjabi films were released worldwide with superhits, including: Shadaa, Ardaas Karaan, Chal Mera Putt, Muklawa, Manje Bistre 2, Nikka Zaildar 3, Singham, Rabb Da Radio 2, Dil Diyaan Gallan, Blackia, Laiye Je Yaarian, Chandigarh Amritsar Chandigarh, Kaka Ji and Band Vajje.

Harjeeta won two awards for Best Punjabi Film and Best Child Actor at 66th National Film Awards. Song Laung Laachi from Laung Laachi film became the first Indian song to reach one billion views on YouTube.

== Festivals ==
Name	Est.	City	Type	Details	Website
Punjabi Film Festival	2007	Amritsar	Special interest	Annual festival focusing on Punjabi films. Sur Saanjh Productions & Navtej Sandhu's brainchild. This festival is the pioneer of Punjabi Film Awards.	
International Film Festival of South Asia	2012	Toronto	International	Annual festival focusing on the cinema of South Asia.	http://www.iffsatoronto.com
Ma Boli International Punjabi Film Festival	2013	Vancouver	Special interest	Annual showcase of Punjabi films.	http://www.mabolifilmfestival.com
New Zealand Punjabi Film Festival	2017	Auckland	Special interest	Annual showcase of Punjabi films.	
Punjabi International Film Festival	2012	Toronto	Special interest	Annual short film festival focusing on Punjabi films	http://www.pifftoronto.com
Sikh International Film Festival	2013	Toronto	Special interest	Annual showcase of Sikh films.	http://sikhfoundationcanada.com/sifft/
Virasat Film Festival and Awards	2016	Melbourne	Special interest	Annual festival focusing on Punjabi films.	http://www.virasatipffa.net

== Film distribution and production companies ==
Notable Punjabi film distribution and/or production companies
Company	Type	Notable Works
Omjee Group / Omjee Cine World	Film Production, Distribution & Exhibition	Harjeeta, Mastaney, Rabb Da Radio 2, Chal Mera Putt, Hoshiar Singh, Carry On Jatta 3, Yaar Mera Titliyan Warga, Kali Jotta, and many more.
Humble Motion Pictures	Film Production	Carry on Jatta 3, Ardaas Karaan, Ardaas, Mar Gaye Oye Loko, Daaka, Warning, Shava Ni Girdhari Lal, Maa, Yaar Mera Titliyaan Warga
White Hill Studios	Film Production, Film Distribution	Jatt & Juliet, Jatt & Juliet 2, Carry on Jatta 2, Sardaar Ji, Sardaar Ji 2, Punjab 1984, Gaddi Jaandi Ae Chalaangaan Maardi, Muklawa, Ardab Mutiyaran, Lekh, Jind Mahi, Shareek 2
Rhythm Boyz Entertainment	Film Production, Film Distribution	Chhalla Mud Ke Nahi Aaya, Jodi, Maurh, Chal Mera Putt, Chal Mera Putt 2, Chal Mera Putt 3, Angrej, Love Punjab, Bambukat, Vekh Baraatan Challiyan, Golak Bugni Bank Te Batua
Ohri Productions	Film Production, Film Distribution	Jihne Mera Dil Luteya, Blackia, Mel Karade Rabba, Yaar Anmulle, Shareek, Jindua, Mukhtiar Chadha
Thind Motion Films	Film Production	Aaja Mexico Challiye, Honsla Rakh, Babe Bhangra Paunde ne, Sher Bagga, Jodi
Studio 7 Production	Film Production	Mitti Na Pharol Jogiya, 22g Tussi Ghaint Ho, Gun & Goal, Balle O Challak Sajjna, Sargi, Sohreyan Da Pind Aa Gya
Shri Narotam Ji Productions	Film Production	Qismat 2, Moh, Bajrey Da Sitta, Surkhi Bindi, Paune 9, Sarabha
Vehli Janta Films	Film Production	Mastaney, Galwakdi, Rabb Da Radio, Rabb Da Radio 2, Sardar Mohammad
Speed Records	Film Production, Film Distribution	Dil Diyan Gallan, Jatt James Bond, Jatt & Juliet, Goreyan Nu Daffa Karo
Neeru Bajwa Entertainment	Film Production	Buhe Barlyan, Kali Jotta, Es Jahano Door Kitte Chal Jindiye, Kokka, Beautiful Billo, Sargi, Channo Kamli Yaar Di
Villagers Film Studio	Film Production	Laung Laachi, Harjeeta, Guddiyan Patole
Geet Mp3	Film Production	Tufang, Shooter, Jatt Brothers, Lover (2022 film)

Other notable Punjabi film and video production and distribution houses:

- Inside Motion Pictures
- Naughty Men Productions
- Dream Reality Films
- Unisys Infosolutions Pvt Ltd/Saga Music Pvt Ltd
- Theatre Army Films

== Distribution ==
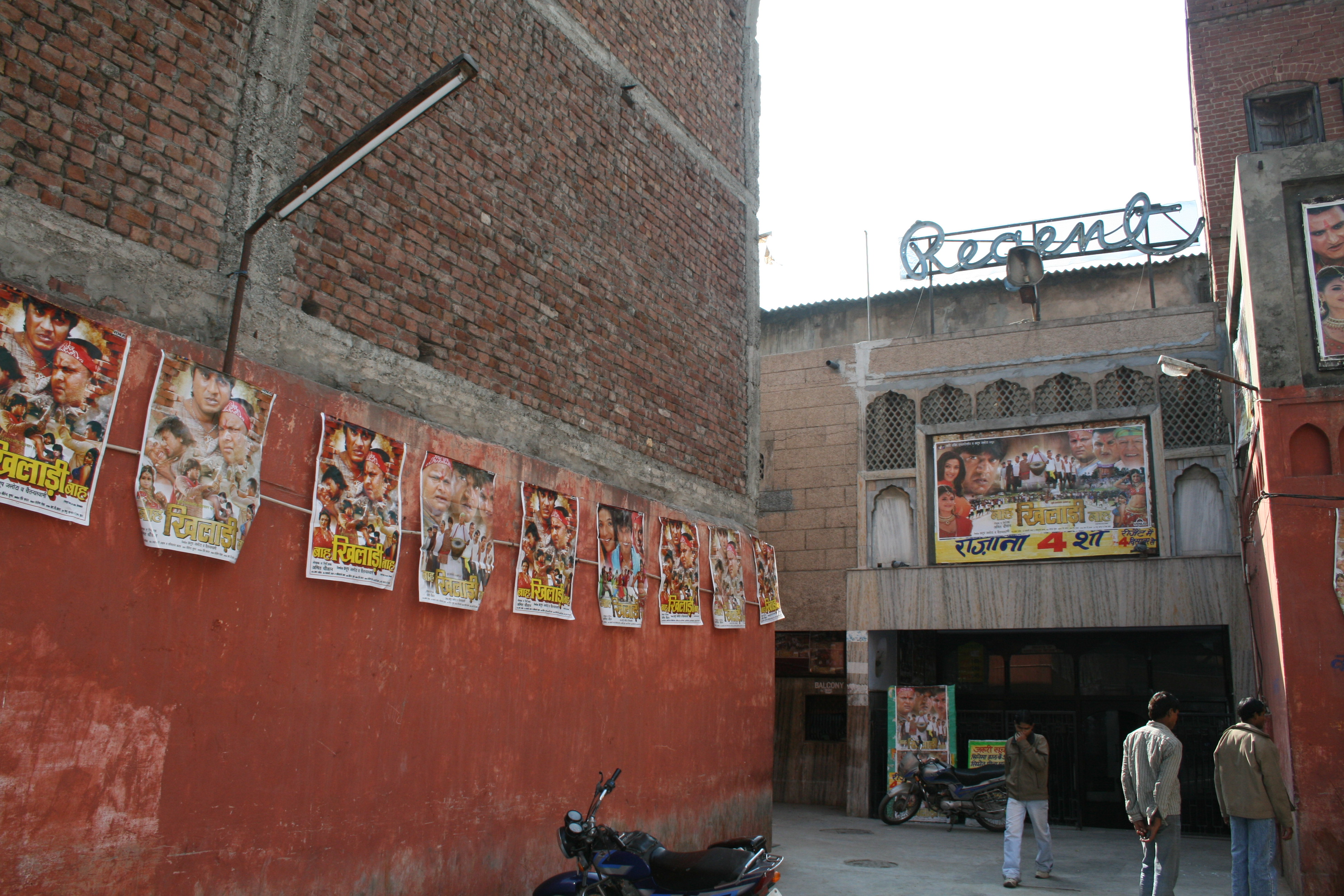
Regent Cinema, Amritsar

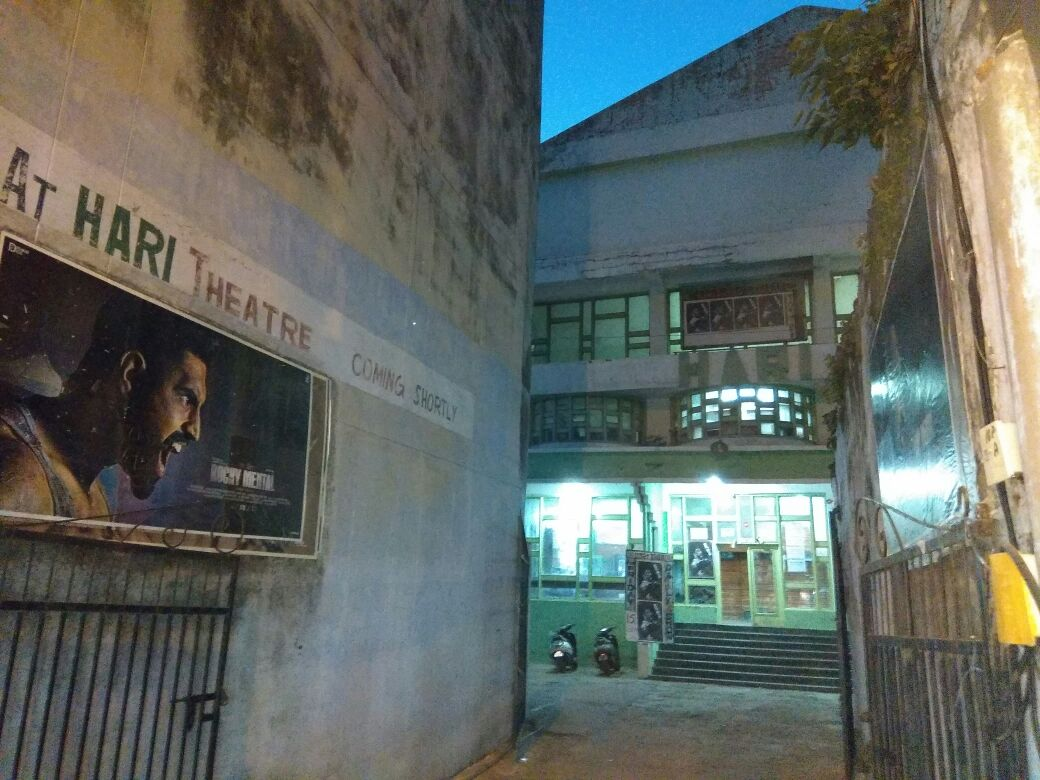
Punjabi movie being shown at Hari theatre Raghunath temple market Jammu, India

Prior to the 20th century, Punjabi film companies was largely in competition for the domestic market. Distribution was a particular issue: releases were limited to Punjab on either side of the border, the Punjabi-speaking areas of Delhi and Rajasthan (Sri Ganganagar, Hanumangarh) had a limited number of screens, and there were no showings in domestic areas. It was difficult to compete with the huge demand for films created by Bollywood. Gradually, Punjabi companies moved to the Australasian, European and North American markets.

In recent years, Canada has become a popular destination for shooting Punjabi films and is the second largest market of Punjabi cinema. About 50 per cent of the revenue for all successful Punjabi films are generated from the overseas markets, including: Australia, Canada, Malaysia, New Zealand, United Kingdom and United States. A number of Punjabi films have also surpassed the gross collections of Bollywood films in the overseas markets.

Punjabi films are finding more releases in Punjabi-dominated areas of South Asia, including East Punjab, West Punjab, Delhi, Haryana, Himachal Pradesh, Uttarakhand (Rudrapur, Bajpur, Kashipur) and Jammu. Punjabi films are also distributed to less-Punjabi populated regions, including states of India: Bengaluru, Gujarat, Hyderabad, Kolkata, Madhya Pradesh, Nanded, Odisha, Bihar and countries: Austria, Belgium, France, Germany, Hong Kong, Italy, Malaysia, Netherlands, Pakistan (other than West Punjab) and Singapore. Punjabi cinema does not make significant revenue from satellite or music due to absence of a sustainable satellite mechanism.

Domestically, there were 4 multiplexes in all of East Punjab in 2007. As of 2014 the numbers have increased to 36 with 99 more approved by the Government of Punjab, India for construction. These in turn have attracted a large middle class audience for Punjabi films which did not exist before.

== Parallel cinema ==
The Punjabi film industry has engaged with Parallel Cinema, an alternative film movement in India originating from West Bengal.

The National Award-winning Marhi Da Deeva (1989) mercilessly explores the issues of economic inequality, social segregation in life of dalit farm labourers and other landless communities in Punjab.

Another National Award winner, Anhe Ghore Da Daan (2011) diligently puts across the distressed and frustrated life-cycle of marginalised Dalits in Punjab. It is the first Punjabi-language film to have travelled to so many international film festivals. The film premiered in the Orizzonti section (Horizons) at the 68th Venice International Film Festival. It won the Special Jury Award and the $50,000 Black Pearl trophy at the Abu Dhabi Film Festival. It was also shown at the 55th BFI London Film Festival, 49th New York Film Festival and the 16th Busan International Film Festival. The film also won the Golden Peacock award for best film at the 43rd International Film Festival of India (IFFI) 2012 held in Panaji, Goa.

Khamosh Pani (2003) is a tragic story of widowed mother and her young son set in a late 1970s village in West Punjab and relations of communities after 1947 Partition of Punjab starring Kiron Kher and Shilpa Shukla.

== Short films ==
- Nooran (2013), based on famous Punjabi author, Balwant Gargi's story Rabbo Marasan, which represents a woman's emotions, Directed by Navtej Sandhu, was sent for Cannes Film Festival-Short Film Corner.
- Kambdi Deorri (The Shivering Gateway) (2014), based on famous Punjabi author, Jaswant Singh Kanwal's story Akk the Amrit, which shows the deteriorating situation of ties within families, Directed by Navtej Sandhu, was again sent for Cannes Film Festival-Short Film Corner.
- The Half Ticket (2018), which was based on a true love story in which the needs of the world overshadow true love, is written and directed by Channa Rai, and stars Victor John. was in Nominated for Best Director at Pune Film Festival-2018.
- Sutta Naag (2014), adapted from Sahitya Akademi Award winner Punjabi writer, Late Ram Sarup Ankhi's short story of same name. The narrative portrays 50 years old Punjab and addresses serious subjects like infidelity and the suppression of women has been premiered at Punjabi International Film Festival, Toronto.
- Khoon (2015), film based on Gurbachan Singh Bhullar's Short story was shown at the Punjabi International Film Festival, Toronto.
- Daughter of the Bin (2015), based on famous Play writer, Dr. Jatinder Brar's play, which shows the plight of the newly born girl child thrown in the dustbin and adopted by a beggar, award-winning short film.
- Gawachi Pagg (The Lost Turban) (2016), based on famous Punjabi writer, Jaswant Singh Kanwal's story, a very emotional and powerful story of an innocent young boy who was looking for his "Lost Esteem" during the militancy period in the era of 80s' in Punjab, internationally critically acclaimed short film Directed by Navtej Sandhu.
- Zindagi a Life of Kinner (2012), based on the story of Jagdev Dhillon, talks about the lives of the third gender, Eunuch (Hijra). The film was directed by Harman Aggarwal and was showcased in Punjabi International Film Festival, Toronto and Delhi International Film Festival.
- Heer Unstoppable (2017) Based on the Plight of women in Punjab who are married to NRI's without any Background check. The film was official selection to Five International Film Festivals with winning Best Director for Jonita Doda at Pink city International Film Festival.
- RAIN (Simran Sidhu, 2017) is the story of a farmer (Bittu Bajwa) on the verge of suicide as he waits for it to rain. The winner of six international awards (including one for Best Drama at Festigious L.A. and a Remi Award, whose previous recipients include Hollywood legends Steven Spielberg, Francis Ford Coppola and George Lucas), writer-director Simran Sidhu's mini-epic also boasts a sweeping score by the world renowned Indonesian composer Elwin Hendrijanto, and guest stars Yashpal Sharma who was so fond of the script that he did the film for free.
- Bhulekha (2018), based on famous Punjabi author, Jaswant Singh Kanwal's story Vehan paye Dariya, love story with very different kind of misunderstanding, Directed by Navtej Sandhu.

== Highest-grossing Punjabi films (worldwide) ==
† Background shading indicates films playing in the week commencing 30 October 2026 in theaters around the world.

Rank	Peak	Title	Year	Director(s)	Writer(s)	Production House(s)	Worldwide Gross	Reference(s)
1	1	Carry on Jatta 2	2018	Smeep Kang	Vaibhav Suman, Shreya Srivastava, Naresh Kathooria	White Hill Studios, A & A Advisors	₹57.67 Crore	
2	2	Saunkan Saunkne	2022	Amarjit Singh Saron	Amberdeep Singh	Naad Studios, Dreamiyata Entertainment, JR Production House	₹57.60 Crore	
3	2	Chal Mera Putt 2	2020-2021-2022	Janjot Singh	Rakesh Dhawan, Sunil Dhawan	Rhythm Boyz Entertainment, Gillz Network, Omjee Star Studios, Phantasy Films Ltd Productions	₹57.15 Crore	
4	3	Honsla Rakh	2021-2022	Amarjit Singh Saron	Rakesh Dhawan	Thind Motion Films, Storytime Productions	₹54.62 Crore	
5	2	Shadaa	2019	Jagdeep Sidhu	Jagdeep Sidhu	A & A Adivisors, Brat Films	₹53.10 Crore	
6	1	Chaar Sahibzaade	2014	Harry Baweja	Harry Baweja, Baldev Gill, Pathik Vats	Baweja Movies, Irealities Technology	₹46.34 Crore	
7	7	Chhalla Mud Ke Nahi Aaya	2022	Amrinder Gill	Amberdeep Singh	Amberdeep Films, Rhythm Boyz Entertainment	₹39.43 Crore	
8	2	Sardaarji	2015	Rohit Jugraj	Dheeraj Rattan, Jatinder Lall, Surmeet Maavi	White Hill Studios	₹38.38 Crore	
9	6	Chal Mera Putt 3	2021	Janjot Singh	Rakesh Dhawan, Jatinder Lall	Rhythm Boyz Entertainment, Gillz Network, Omjee Star Studios, Canvas Creations Ltd	₹35.84 Crore	

== Awards ==
- Filmfare Awards
- PTC Punjabi Film Awards
- Punjabi International Film Academy Awards
- Brit Asia Film Awards
- Virasat Film Awards
- Punjabi Entertainment Festival & Awards

== See also ==
- List of Punjabi films
- List of highest-grossing Punjabi films
- Lists of Indian Punjabi films
- List of Punjabi Cinema Actors
- List of Punjabi Cinema Actresses
- List of Punjabi Directors
