= Sikander Ghuman =

Sikander Ghuman, also credited as G Human, is a British-Punjabi actor and producer who primarily works in Punjabi-language films. He has appeared in the Chal Mera Putt film series and other Punjabi films such as Maurh, Aaja Mexico Challiye, and Marriage Palace. Before his film career, he was involved in professional Punjabi theatre.

== Early life ==
Ghuman was born in Kapurthala, Punjab, India. Following the death of his mother shortly after his birth, he was raised by his grandfather. His family later relocated to the United Kingdom. Prior to entering the entertainment industry, he worked in various jobs.

== Theatre ==
Ghuman performed in professional Punjabi theatre, playing noted roles in productions including Yaar Kalakaar, Kaem Zindagi, and Jona Mod.

== Career ==
Ghuman began appearing in Punjabi films in the late 2010s, with roles in Marriage Palace (2018), Band Vaaje (2019), and Jagga Jiunda E (2018). He is known for playing the character Gaafa in the Chal Mera Putt film series, including its sequels Chal Mera Putt, Chal Mera Putt 2, Chal Mera Putt 3 released in 2020, 2021, and the upcoming 2025 installment.

In Aaja Mexico Challiye (2022), he portrayed the father of the character Shehbaaz. In 2023, he appeared as Raja Raghbir Singh in the historical film Maurh.

Ghuman also featured in Golak Bugni Bank Te Batua 2 (scheduled for 2025) and Parohneya Nu Daffa Karo (2025), the latter released on the streaming platform Chaupal.

In addition to acting, Ghuman produced and acted in the film Aashiqui Not Allowed (2013).

== Filmography ==
| Year | Film | Role | Notes |
|---|---|---|---|
| 2013 | Aashiqui Not Allowed | Sikander | Producer |
| 2018 | Marriage Palace | Billu | |
| 2018 | Jagga Jiunda E | Raja | |
| 2019 | Band Vaaje | Harpal | |
| 2019 | Chal Mera Putt | Gaafa | |
| 2020 | Chal Mera Putt 2 | Gaafa | |
| 2021 | Chal Mera Putt 3 | Gaafa | |
| 2022 | Aaja Mexico Challiye | Shehbaaz’s father | |
| 2023 | Maurh | Raja Raghbir Singh | |
| 2023 | Maa Da Ladla | | |
| 2025 | Parohneya Nu Daffa Karo | Friend of lead character | Released on Chaupal |
| 2025 | Chal Mera Putt 4 | Gaafa | Upcoming |
| 2025 | Golak Bugni Bank Te Batua 2 | | Upcoming |
