= Hobby Dhaliwal =

Indian actor, comedian and politician

Personal details
- Born: Kamaldeep Singh Dhaliwal <Jan 10, 1961RELIABLE SOURCE -->> Sangrur, Punjab, India
- Party: Bharatiya Janata Party (2022–present)
- Education: Government Mohindra College, Patiala, Punjab, Punjab
- Occupation: Actor; politician; singer
- Notable work: Ardaas Karaan; Lahoriye; Angrej; Jora 10 Numbaria

Comedy career
- Genres: Films; Music; Television

Kamaldeep Singh Dhaliwal, commonly known as Hobby Dhaliwal is an Indian film actor, singer, and politician. He is known for his works in Punjabi and Hindi films. Dhaliwal began his career by debut movie Burrraahh in 2012. The films Angrej (2015), Lahoriye (2017), Jora 10 Numbaria (2017), and Ardaas Karaan (2019) are among his best known works.

== Early life and education ==
Hobby was born in Sangrur, Punjab, India. He attended the government school in Patiala and graduated from the Government Mohindra College in Patiala, Punjab. With brothers named Sukhwant Singh Dhaliwal and Pradeep Singh Dhaliwal, Hobby was born to Balvir Singh Dhaliwal and Surinder Kaur. The fashion designer Lilli Dhaliwal and Hobby Dhaliwal wed in 1989 and two kids were born to the couple. it doesn’t add up how he got married in 1989 yet he was born in 1977.

== Career ==
=== Music career ===
During college events, Dhaliwal was recognized by Punjabi singer Pammi Bai, who later performed alongside him on stages. Hobby Dhaliwal, as a singer, has three studio albums: Mar Jangeero Geda, Sade pind na Avi, and Jatt Warga Yaar ni Thiona before entering in Punjabi cinema.

=== Acting career ===
He is best known for the films Ardaas Karaan, Jora 10 Numbaria, Lahoriye, Angrej, Bambukat and Lahoriye but also appeared in the number of films, and web series.

== Filmography ==
- Burrraahh (2012) as Sidhu
- Fer Mamla Gadbad Gadbad (2013) as Sarpanch
- Heer & Hero (2013) as Sweety's dad
- Mundeyan Ton Bachke Rahin (2014) as Mr. Sandhu
- Punjabian Da King (2015) as Balraj Singh
- Angrej (2015) as Gajjan Singh (Dhann Kaur's father)
- Shareek (2015) as Nachattar
- Shareek 2 (2016) as Pakko's father
- 25 Kille (2016) as Santokh Singh
- Phillauri (2017) as Kanan's father
- Manje Bistre (2017) as
- Arjan (2017) as Sarpanch
- Lahoriye (2017) as Chaudhary- Neseem's father
- Saab Bahadar (2017) as Ruldu Sarpanch
- Krazzy Tabbar (2017) as Dhaliwal
- Thug Life (2017) as Chief Minister
- Jora 10 Numbaria (2017) as eja Aulakh
- Bailaras (2017) as
- Dangar Doctor Jelly (2017) as DSP Kabul Singh
- Laung Laachi (2018) as Ajaypal's father
- Carry on Jatta 2 (2018) as Mr. Sandhu- Meet's Uncle
- Jatt vs. Ielts (2018) as
- Ashke (2018) as Dhaliwal- Bhangra Coach
- Mar Gaye Oye Loko (2018) as
- Kurmaiyan (2018) as Ajaib Singh- Paali's dad
- Parahuna (2018) as Jantaa's father
- Namaste England (2018) as Param's Bauji
- Rang Panjab (2018) as
- Bhajjo Veero Ve (2018) as Surmeet's father
- Titanic (2018) as
- Desi (2019) as
- High End Yaariyaan (2019) as Nachhatar Singh
- Munda Faridkotia (2019) as Malik
- Yaara Ve (2019) as
- Nadhoo Khan (2019) as Poorna
- Lukan Michi (2019) as Sardaara
- 15 Lakh Kado Aauga (2019) as
- Punj Khaab (2019) as
- Ardaas Karaan (2019) as Sohan- Sehaj's father
- Ashke 2 (2019) as
- Khandaani Shafakhana (2019) as Pradhaan
- Jaddi Sardar (2019) as Shamsher Shera
- Doorbeen (2019) as DSP Satrang Singh
- Daaka (2019) as Sukhchain
- Easy Money (2019) as Short
- Mool Mantar (2019) as
- Jinde Meriye (2020) as Dilaawar
- Ik Sandhu Hunda Si (2020) as Sandhu's Father
- Happy Happy Ho Gaya (2021) as
- Fauji Band (2021) as
- Teri Meri Nahi Nibhni (2021) as
- Range (2021) as
- Ucha Pind (2021) as Shamsher Singh
- Thana Sadar (2021) as
- Fuffad Ji (2021) as Sardara
- Prindey (2022) as
- Mera Vyah Kara Do (2022) as
- Bajre Da Sitta (2022) as
- Baraat Bandi (2022) as
- S.H.O. Sher Singh (2022) as
- Shikaari 2 (2022) as
- Sayonee (TBA) as
- Victor (TBA) as Madhulal
- Mukkaddar (TBA) as
- ' 'IB71' ' (TBA) as

== Political career ==
On 7 February 2022, in Chandigarh, Hobby Dhaliwal formally joined the Bharatiya Janata Party (BJP) in the presence of Manohar Lal Khattar, the Chief Minister of Haryana, and Gajendra Singh Shekhawat, a Union minister and the BJP's regional director for Punjab. Khattar welcomed the actor to the party and declared, "With well-known artists like Dhaliwal selecting the BJP, the party will further strengthen in Punjab. Due to their dissatisfaction with other political parties, more of these people are joining the saffron party.
