= Sarvann =

- Theatrical release poster
- Directed by: Karan Gulianii
- Written by: Amberdeep Singh
- Produced by: Priyanka Chopra; Dr. Madhu Chopra; Deepshikha Deshmukh
- Starring: Amrinder Gill; Simi Chahal; Ranjit Bawa; Sardar Sohi; Dilnoor Kaur
- Cinematography: Vineet Malhotra
- Edited by: Omkarnath Bhakri
- Music by: Jatinder Shah
- Production companies: Purple Pebble Pictures; Pooja Entertainment
- Distributed by: Omjee Cine World
- Release date: 13 January 2017
- Running time: 116 minutes
- Country: India
- Language: Punjabi

Sarvann is a 2017 Indian Punjabi language thriller film directed by Karan Guliani, written by Amberdeep Singh and produced by Priyanka Chopra under her production company Purple Pebble Pictures. It stars Amrinder Gill, Simi Chahal & Ranjit Bawa as the main protagonist of the film and was released worldwide on 13 January 2017.

== Cast ==
- Amrinder Gill as Mithu
- Simi Chahal as Paali
- Ranjit Bawa as Amreek
- Sardar Sohi as DSP
- Amberdeep Singh as Taxi driver
- Gurmeet Saajan as Paali's father
- Seema Kaushal as Paali's mother
- Anita Meet as Sarvann's mother
- Rubina as Angel's Mother
- Dilnoor Kaur as Angel
- Jasmeen Johal as Mithu's sister
- Navdeep Dhillon as Peter
- Don McLeod as Cop
- Cameron McDonald as Cop #3

== Track list ==
S.No	Track	Singer	Lyrics	Music
1.	"Ni Mainu"	Amrinder Gill	Happy Raikoti	Jatinder Shah
2.	"Sarvann Putt"	Ranjit Bawa	Bir Singh	Jatinder Shah
3.	"Dishaheen"	Bir Singh	Bir Singh	Jatinder Shah
4.	"Rajya"	Gurshabad	Harman Jeet	Jatinder Shah
5.	"Aaj More Aaye Hai"	Joginder Singh	Traditional	Jatinder Shah
6.	"Pichle Avgan Baksh"	Joginder Singh	Traditional	Jatinder Shah
7.	"Mitar Pyare Nu"	Ashok Chopra	Sri Guru Gobind Singh Ji	Jatinder Shah
