= Simi Chahal =

Indian actress

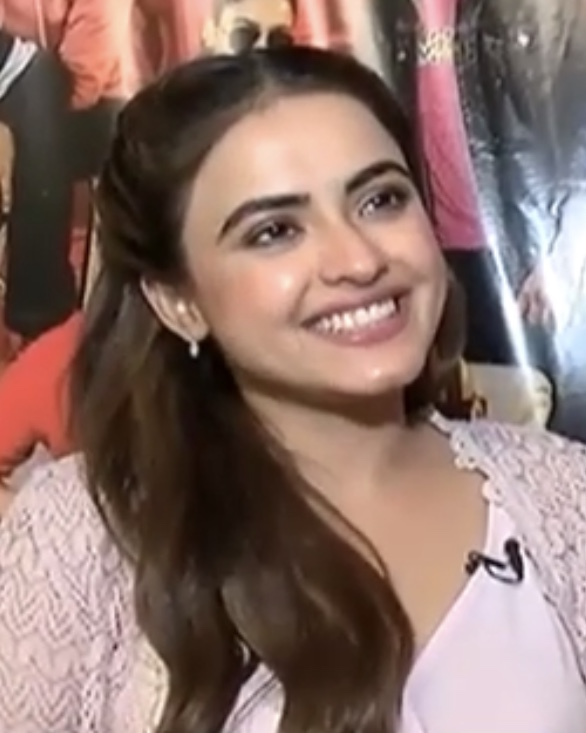
- Born: 9 May
- Occupations: Actress, model
- Years active: 2014–present
- Known for: Bambukat; Rabb Da Radio; Daana Paani; Chal Mera Putt; Mastaney

Simarpreet Kaur "Simi" Chahal is an Indian actress who predominantly works in Punjabi films.

== Life and career ==
Born Simarpreet Kaur Chahal and hailing from Ambala, she first stepped into the entertainment industry in 2014 where she appeared in some Punjabi music videos. After being discovered by talent scouts, she then went on to make her Punjabi film debut with the 2016 film Bambukat directed by Pankaj Batra and starred alongside Ammy Virk which was a success. Her next venture was with Priyanka Chopra where she starred in a film that she produced under her production banner Purple Pebble Pictures called Sarvann alongside Amrinder Gill. Chahal won a Filmfare Award (Punjabi) for Best Debut Actress in 2017 for her role in Bambukat, and, in 2018, won the Best Actress Critics Award at the PTC Punjabi Film Awards.

== Filmography ==
Key
†	Denotes films that have not yet been released

Year	Film	Role	Notes
2016	Bambukat	Parminder Kaur ’Pakko’	Debut film
2017	Sarvann	Paali	
2017	Rabb Da Radio	Guddi	
2018	Golak Bugni Bank Te Batua	Mishri	
2018	Daana Paani	Basant Kaur	
2018	Bhajjo Veero Ve	Sumeet	
2019	Rabb Da Radio 2	Guddi	
2019	Manje Bistre 2	Raano	
2019	Chal Mera Putt	Savy	
2020	Chal Mera Putt 2	Savy	
2021	Chal Mera Putt 3	Savy	
2023	Kade Dade Diyan Kade Pote Diyan	Kamal	
2023	Mastaney	Noor	
2024	Jee Ve Sohneya Jee	Meher	
2025	Hoshiar Singh (Apna Arastu)	Keerat	
2025	Chal Mera Putt 4	Savy	
2026	Bambukat 2	Pakko	

== Awards and nominations ==
- PTC Punjabi Film Awards 2017 - Best Debut Actress Award (Won)
- Filmfare 2017 Best Debut Actress Award (Won)
- PTC Punjabi Film Awards 2018 - Best Actress Critics Award (Won)
