= Kade Dade Diyan Kade Pote Diyan =

- Directed by: Laada Siyan Ghuman
- Story by: Karan Sandhu, Dheeraj Kumar
- Produced by: Jatinder Singh Lovely, Dheeraj Kumar, Karan Sandhu
- Starring: Harish Verma, Simi Chahal, B. N. Sharma, Seema Kaushal, Dheeraj Kumar and Sukhwinder Chahal
- Cinematography: Jaype Singh
- Music by: Gurcharan Singh
- Release date: 14 July 2023
- Country: India
- Language: Punjabi

Kade Dade Diyan Kade Pote Diyan is a 2023 Punjabi film directed by Laada Siyan Ghuman and written by Karan Sandhu and Dheeraj Kumar. It stars Harish Verma, Simi Chahal, B. N. Sharma, Seema Kaushal, Dheeraj Kumar and Sukhwinder Chahal. The film was released on 14 July 2023.

== Cast ==
- Harish Verma
- Simi Chahal
- B.N. Sharma
- Jatinder Kaur
- Anita Devgan
- Sukhwinder Chahal
- Dheeraj Kumar
- Ashok Pathak
- Sumit Gulati
- Seema Kaushal
- Parkash Gadhu
- Neha Dayal
- Kamaldeep Kaur
- Gurpreet Kaur Bhangu

== Plot ==
Goga and Kamal want to marry each other but Kamal's grandmother is against this relationship. The grandmother's death does not end Goga's problems as she appears to Goga after her death. To rectify this situation, Goga seeks the help of a sage who advises him to summon his dead grandfather. The two lovers finally reunite after the family members pacify the ghost of the grandparents.

== Reception ==
Jaspreet Nijher of Times of India gave the film 3 out of 5 stars rating. Tanvi Pahuja of 5 Dariya News reviewed the film and gave 4 out of 5 stars rating. Kiddan.com also gave the 4 out of 5 stars.

On 11 August the film was released in Pakistan

== Soundtrack ==
Kade Dade Diyan Kade Pote Diyan

Soundtrack album by Amrinder Gill, Prabh Gill, Gurnam Bhullar, D Harp, Mr Dee
- Genre: Film soundtrack
- Label: Ryhthm Boys
- Producers: Jatinder Shah, The Boss, Bugzy, Mr. Pendu, Ishan Pandit, Blaze Music

Track Listing
No.	Title	Artist	Length
1.	"Kade Dade Diyan Kade Pote Diyan"	D Harp and Mr. Dee	00:01:49
2.	"Kora Kujja"	Amrinder Gill	00:03:11
3.	"Geda"	Gurnam Bhullar	00:02:45
4.	"Tere Bol"	Prabh Gill	00:02:50
5.	"Raniya"	D Harp	00:02:36
