= Mitran Nu Shaunk Hathyaran Da =

Punjabi romantic comedy

- Punjabi: Mitran Nu Shaunk Hathyaran Da
- Directed by: Sagar S Sharma
- Written by: Kumar Ajay
- Produced by: Munna Shukul, Jayesh Patel, Shikha Sharma; Abhinn Sharma; Manthan Purohit
- Starring: Siddhi Ahuja; Preet Baath; Deep Joshi; Veer Vashisht; Kumar Ajay; Keetika; Sagar Sharma; Satwant Kaur
- Cinematography: Mahesh Sarojini Rajan
- Edited by: Bharat S Raawat
- Music by: Abhishek Mahavir; Sundeep Gosswami
- Production companies: Shukul Showbiz; Sagar S Sharma Production; UV Motion Pictures; H S R Entertainment
- Release date: 8 November 2019 (India)
- Country: India
- Language: Punjabi

Mitran Nu Shaunk Hathyaran Da is a Punjabi action film directed by Sagar Sharma. This film revolves around the story of four friends and the impact of power and guns in their lives. The story is particularly targeted at today's youth and captures the typical Punjab culture. Mitran Nu Shaunk Hathyaran Da had a strong ensemble star cast and the film crew had a good experience of already having worked for Punjabi cinema.

== Cast ==
- Siddhi Ahuja
- Preet Baath
- Deep Joshi
- Veer Vashisht
- Mahima Hura
- Satwant Kaur

== Story ==
Four friends Dev, Baman, Jaudu and Binda have a strong fascination for power. They are strong and daring and this leads to them getting involved in unlawful land mafia activities for a powerful minister, Bhullar. They are assigned the task to forcefully vacate the residents of a home that comes in the center of land that Bhullar wants to develop for his business. This home belongs to the wife of a martyred soldier and her two daughters. They try hard to make them vacate the home but are made to realize their mistake. The changed friends now help the widow and her daughters in safeguarding the home against Bhullar but they are so badly caught in the power game and any chance of self-redemption is thwarted by the powerful and corrupt people above them. This film is about the love for power and gun and the final consequence of it.

== Awards and nominations ==
Mitran Nu Shaunk Hathyaran Da was nominated in four categories in the PTC Punjabi Film Awards 2020 with one category receiving a double nomination.

1. Best Action (Vishal Bhargav & Singh Is King)
2. Best Performance in Negative Role (Sagar S Sharma)
3. Best Supporting Actress (Satwant Kaur)
4. Filmy Yaar of the Year( Preet Baath/Deep Joshi)
5. Filmy Yaar of the Year (Kumar Ajay/Veer Vashisht)

== Reception ==
Sonia Khanna of Punjabi Pollywood gave the film 3.5 stars and wrote that the lead cast has done its job pretty well.
