= Karaj Gill =

Indian film producer

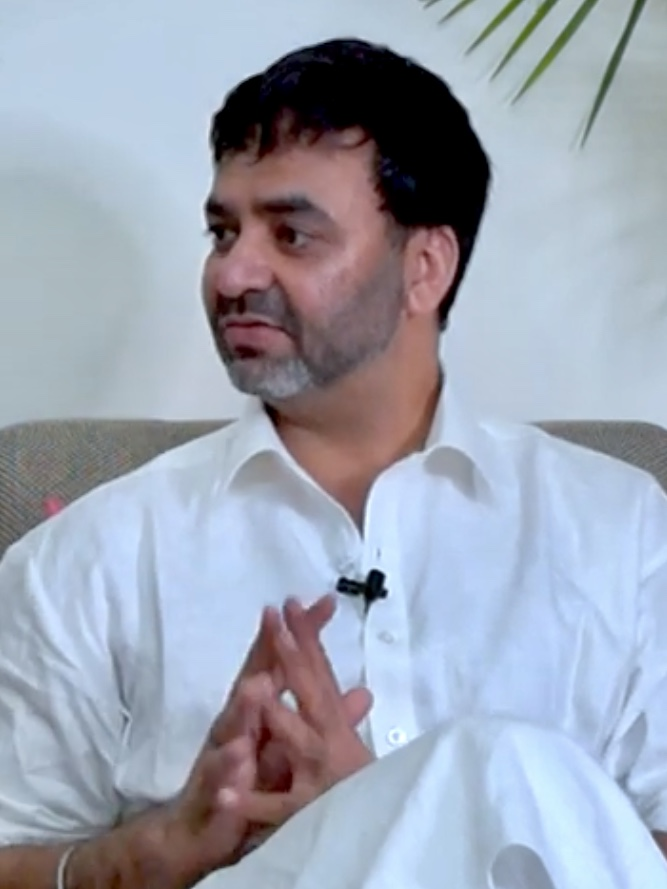
- Karaj Gill in 2019
- Born: 19 September
- Education: Khalsa College, Amritsar
- Occupation: Film producer
- Years active: 2013–present
- Title: President of Rhythm Boyz Entertainment

Karaj Gill is an Indian film producer who makes Punjabi-language films and music. He owns a production house and distribution company Rhythm Boyz Entertainment. Gill began producing films in 2015, with a historical romance film Angrej. He has been nominated for six Filmfare Punjabi Awards, winning two for Bambukat (2016) and Lahoriye (2017), among other accolades.

== Career ==
Gill co-founded a Canadian production company Rhythm Boyz Entertainment with Amrinder Gill on 19 March 2013. The company was named after their college time Bhangra group of same name. In 2014, a studio album Judaa 2 by Amrinder Gill and Dr Zeus was produced by company. He made his debut as a film producer with Angrej in 2015. Conceived as a romantic comedy set in the pre-partitioned Punjab, the film was directed by Simerjit Singh and was written by Amberdeep Singh, and starred Amrinder Gill, Sargun Mehta, and Aditi Sharma in lead roles. It grossed ₹307 million (equivalent to ₹460 million or US$4.8 million in 2023) in whole theatrical run, making it one of the highest-grossing Punjabi films of all time. Also, the film was critically acclaimed and won ten awards at PTC Punjabi Film Awards including Best Film. Gill in an interview disclosed that their team tries to produce family and meaningful films, and most of the films produced by him are "U" rated in India.

== Filmography as producer ==
Year	Film	Director
2015	Angrej	Simerjit Singh
2016	Love Punjab	Rajiv Dhingra
2016	Bambukat	Pankaj Batra
2017	Lahoriye	Amberdeep Singh
2017	Vekh Baraatan Challiyan	Ksshitij Chaudhary
2017	Bhalwan Singh	Param Shiv
2018	Golak Bugni Bank Te Batua	Ksshitij Chaudhary
2018	Ashke	Amberdeep Singh
2018	Bhajjo Veero Ve	Amberdeep Singh
2019	Chal Mera Putt	Janjot Singh
2020	Chal Mera Putt 2	Janjot Singh
2021	Chal Mera Putt 3	Janjot Singh
2022	Chhalla Mud Ke Nahi Aaya	Amrinder Gill
2023	Jodi	Amberdeep Singh
2023	Maurh	Jatinder Mauhar
2024	Daaru Na Peenda Hove	Rajiv Dhingra
2024	Mittran da Challeya Truck ni	Rakesh Dhawan
2025	Chal Mera Putt 4	Janjot Singh
