= Ashke =

- Theatrical release poster
- Directed by: Amberdeep Singh
- Screenplay by: Dheeraj Rattan
- Produced by: Karaj Gill; Talwinder Hayre; Munish Sahni
- Starring: Amrinder Gill; Sanjeeda Sheikh; Sarbjit Cheema; Jaswinder Bhalla; Roopi Gill; Hobby Dhaliwal
- Cinematography: Navneet Misser (India); Sukh Sanghera (Canada)
- Edited by: Rohit Dhiman
- Music by: Gurcharan Singh
- Production companies: Rhythm Boyz Entertainment; Hayre Omjee Studios
- Distributed by: Omjee Group (India) Rhythm Boyz (Canada and America) Rising Star (United States)
- Release date: 27 July 2018
- Running time: 122 mins
- Countries: India; Canada
- Language: Punjabi
- Box office: ₹18 crore

Ashke is a 2018 Indian-Punjabi film based on popular folk dance Bhangra and is written by Dheeraj Rattan and directed by Amberdeep Singh. It stars Amrinder Gill, Sanjeeda Shaikh, and Roopi Gill in lead roles and Sarbjit Cheema, Hobby Dhaliwal, Jaswinder Bhalla, Avy Randhawa and Gurshabad in supporting roles. Additionally, the film marks as debut for Roopi Gill and Sanjeeda Shaikh in Pollywood.

Ashke was released worldwide on 27 July 2018. At the Brit Asia TV Awards, the film received six nominations including Best Film and Best Actor (Gill).

== Plot ==
Pamma is in his late thirties living in Canada with his sister and her family. He is doing petty jobs but does not carry on for very long as he has a bad temper and lack of subordination. He is struggling to live and find a direction in his life in contrast with the Pamma from 15 years back, who was full of life and hope.

Fifteen years earlier he had been one of the figures at Khalsa College in Amritsar. known for his passion, for Bhangra. However a series of setbacks transformed his life. He was separated from his dance team, his beloved and his father. During this period he found shelter under his sister’s roof, where her unwavering love provided comfort and stability as everything else fell apart.

Now at an unexpected juncture, his sister's child Ekam finds out about his dance talent and the kids are in dire need of his help. This equation brings him closer to kids and his long-lost passion. He also comes across his lost love Jia, in a vulnerable situation, and Pamma rediscovers emotions he had suppressed for years.

== Cast ==
- Amrinder Gill as Pamma
- Sanjeeda Sheikh as Jiya
- Jaswinder Bhalla as Pritam Singh Pandori
- Sarbjit Cheema as Vikram
- Hobby Dhaliwal as Dhaliwal Saab
- Gurshabad as Gogaa
- Roopi Gill as Noor
- Hardeep Gill as Pamma's father
- Avy Randhawa as Preet, Pamma's sister
- Sehaj Sahib as Agam
- Harjot Sandhu as Ekam
- Amberdeep Singh as Noor's brother (cameo appearance)
- Vandana Chopra as Jiya's mother
- Jatinder Kaur as Jiya's grandmother
- Harish Verma as Jiya's husband (cameo appearance)

== Soundtrack ==
Ashke

Soundtrack album by Jatinder Shah
- Released: 2018
- Recorded: 2018
- Genre: Feature film soundtrack
- Language: Punjabi
- Label: Rhythm Boyz Entertainment

Jatinder Shah chronology
| Vadhayiyaan Ji Vadhayiyaan (2018) | Ashke (2018) | Laatu (2018) |

=== Track listing ===
| No. | Title | Lyrics | Music | Singer(s) | Length |
|---|---|---|---|---|---|
| 1. | "Ashke" (title song) | Harmanjeet | Jatinder Shah | Arif Lohar | 1:59 |
| 2. | "Handsome Jatta" | Bunty Bains | Davvy Singh | Jordan Sandhu | 2:48 |
| 3. | "Leekan" | Raj Ranjodh | Jatinder Shah | Amrinder Gill | 3:35 |
| 4. | "Ashke Boliyan" | Raj Ranjodh | Jatinder Shah | Gurshabad | 2:09 |
| 5. | "Bholepan" | Surinder Sadhpuri | Jatinder Shah | Rakesh Maini | 2:42 |

== Release ==
Amrinder Gill announced the name and release date of Ashke on Instagram on his birthday, 11 May 2018. Ashke was released worldwide on 27 July 2018. The first look poster was released on 9 July 2018 and a trailer was released the night before its release date. The film was theatrically released on 27 July 2018. Major releases includes India, Canada, United States and Australia. The film was digitally released on 15 November 2018 on YouTube by Rhythm Boyz and was premiered first time on television on 23 December 2018 on PTC Punjabi.

== Reception ==
=== Box office ===
Ashke grossed $379,988 (₹2.6 crores) in Australia; in New Zealand, the film grossed ₹53.68 lacs; it earned ₹1.27 crores in the United States and ₹5.94 crores in Canada in its 7-week theatrical run, making a worldwide total of ₹18 crores.

=== Critical reception ===
- The Tribune – 3.5 out of 5 stars

Somewhere here and there, the film comes across half-baked; a little more temperature and it would have been at its crispiest best! But even without it, this is a film that can truly be called a family entertainer. The film is neither stretched nor boring; it has easy and flowing rhythm which sits easy on your mind and heart. Since the film revolves around Bhangra, it has vibrancy too. The film has subtle humour, which goes with the pace of the film.

— Jasmine Singh, The Tribune
- Dekh News – 3.5 out of 5 stars

This movie is going to make you all amazed because of the good direction and production work. Punjabi movie “Ashke” is going to make you all amazed because it has good content. Some reports are suggesting that this flick is going to make you all amazed because of the good production work.

— Shubham Bhaukhandi, Dekh News
