= Ardaas Sarbat De Bhale Di =

2024 Indian Punjabi-language social drama film

- Directed by: Gippy Grewal; Diljot Singh
- Screenplay by: Gippy Grewal
- Story by: Gippy Grewal
- Produced by: Gippy Grewal
- Starring: Gurpreet Ghuggi; Gippy Grewal; Jasmin Bhasin, Nirmal Rishi and Prince Kanwaljit Singh
- Cinematography: Baljit Singh Deo
- Edited by: Gurjeet Hundal
- Production companies: Humble Motion Pictures, Jio Studios, Panorama Studios
- Release date: 13 September 2024
- Running time: 133 minutes
- Country: India
- Language: Punjabi

Ardaas Sarbat De Bhale Di is 2024 indian Punjabi-language social drama film directed by Gippy Grewal. It is sequel to Ardaas Karaan and the third installment in Ardaas series. Produced by Humble Motion Pictures; it stars Gippy Grewal, Gurpreet Ghuggi, Jasmin Bhasin, Nirmal Rishi and Prince Kanwaljit Singh.

it was theatrically released on 13 September 2024.

== Release ==
The film was released theatriclly on 13 September 2024 in india. It is available on OTT platform Chaupal.

== Cast ==
- Gippy Grewal
- Gurpreet Ghuggi
- Jasmin Bhasin
- Nirmal Rishi
- Prince Kanwaljit Singh
- Raghveer Boli
- Rupinder Rupi

== Reception ==
=== Critical response ===
5dariyanews rated the film 5/5 stars and wrote 'The movie succeeds in delivering a message that resonates with audiences on a personal and spiritual level.' Gurnaaz of The Tribune gave 3.5/5 stars stating 'film succeeds in creating an emotional and spiritual journey for its audience. Its strengths lie in its powerful performances and the way it portrays the transformative power of faith and reflection'. Archika Khurana of The Times of India gave 4/5 starts, in their opion 'it delivers a message of hope, reminding viewers to hold on to faith even in their darkest moments.' Sukhpreet Kahlon of The Indian Express rated 3/5 stars.
