= Jee Ve Sohneya Jee =

- Theatrical release poster
- Directed by: Thaparr
- Written by: Thaparr
- Starring: Simi Chahal; Imran Abbas
- Production companies: U&I Films; VH Entertainment
- Release date: 16 February 2024
- Running time: 141 minutes
- Country: India
- Language: Punjabi

Jee Ve Sohneya Jee is a 2024 Indian Punjabi-language film directed by Thaparr. It stars Simi Chahal and Imran Abbas in lead roles and Mintu Kappa, Udaya Vakati Suriyanarayana, Ketabchi Ash, Alexander Garcia, Lee Nicholas Harris and Chetan Mohture in supporting roles. It was scheduled to be released on 6 October 2023 but the release date was pushed to 16 February 2024 on which it was eventually released.

== Cast ==
- Simi Chahal as Meher
- Imran Abbas as Ali Parvaiz
- Mintu Kappa as Sabi
- Zafar Abbas as Jamil
- Udaya Vakati as Linda Joseph
- Praveen Kumar as Tarsem
- Tauqeer Ahmed Paul as Rehan
- Swaraj Sandhu as Meher's father
- Anam Tanveer as Aasiya
- Farah Nadeem as Aasiya's mother
- Sajid Hasan as Adil Parvaiz
- Salma Zafar Asim as Ali's mother
- Brian Shaw as Sam
- Arshdeep Kaur Bhatti as Preeti
- Aman Bal as Deepi
- Arsala Tahir as Aamna
- Simon Charles Thompson as Sebestian
- Lesley Anne Webb as Jennifer
- Ashley Brown as Police officer

== Music ==
Track listing
No.	Title	Lyrics	Music	Singer(s)	Length
1.	"Jee Ve Sohneya Jee"	Raj Fathepur	Sunny Vik	Atif Aslam	4:31
2.	"Zaruri Ae"	Khara	Sunny Vik	Vikas Maan	3:39
3.	"Wafa"	Dilwala	Sunny Vik	Afsana Khan	4:33
4.	"Sufna Ae Mera"	Khara	Sunny Vik	Vikas Maan	4:00
5.	"Bhanda Bhandaariya"	Khara	N Vee	Master Saleem	3:22
Total length:					20:05

== Reception ==
A critic from 5 Dariya News rated the film 4 1/2 out of 5 and wrote that the film "is not just a love story; it is a testament to the enduring spirit of human connection in the face of adversity. It is a heartwarming narrative that celebrates the beauty of coming together, overcoming obstacles, and emerging stronger on the other side of life's unpredictable journey".
