= Chal Mera Putt =

2019 Indian Punjabi-language comedy-drama film

- Theatrical film poster
- Directed by: Janjot Singh
- Screenplay by: Rakesh Dhawan; Kulwant Singh
- Story by: Rakesh Dhawan
- Produced by: Karaj Gill; Ashu Munish Sahni
- Starring: Amrinder Gill; Simi Chahal; Iftikhar Thakur; Nasir Chinyoti; Akram Udas; Rup Khatkar; Hardeep Gill; Gurshabad
- Cinematography: Sandeep Patil
- Edited by: Sadik Ali Shaikh
- Music by: Dr Zeus; Gurcharan Singh
- Production companies: Rhythm Boyz Entertainment; Gillz Network; Omjee Star Studios
- Distributed by: Omjee Star Studios; Rhythm Boyz
- Release date: 26 July 2019 (India)
- Running time: 124 minutes
- Country: India
- Language: Punjabi
- Box office: est. ₹30 crore

Chal Mera Putt is a 2019 Indian Punjabi-language comedy-drama Film directed by Janjot Singh and co-produced by Rhythm Boyz Entertainment, Gillz Network and Omjee Star Studios. It stars Amrinder Gill, Simi Chahal, Iftikhar Thakur, Nasir Chinyoti, Akram Udas, Rup Khatkar, Hardeep Gill and Gurshabad. The film revolves around Punjabis trying hard to make a living in a foreign land. The film will followed by a direct sequel Chal Mera Putt 2 (2020). It marked the feature film directorial debut for Janjot Singh.

The film written by Rakesh Dhawan, started its principal photography in May 2019 at Birmingham, and ended in June 2019. Additional filming took place in parts of Punjab, India. Soundtrack of the film is composed by Dr Zeus and Gurcharan Singh, which features vocals from Gill, Gurshabad, Nimrat Khaira, and Bir Singh. It was released in India on 26 July 2019.

Chal Mera Putt grossed over ₹30 crore (US$3.1 million) globally in its theatrical run, making it one of highest-grossing Punjabi films and highest-grossing Punjabi film at overseas with an overseas gross over US$3.6 million. At PTC Punjabi Film Awards, the film received six nominations including Best Comedy Film.

== Plot ==
Jinder, Bikkar and Billa are illegally working in Birmingham, United Kingdom to earn money for their families back in India. They are constantly in danger of immigration raids while working multiple jobs. Savy and Bal move in next door, and they become friends with Jinder. Tavrej and Butta arrive from Pakistan with the aim of making money. They stay with Chaudhary Shamsher.

One day, Jinder, Bikkar and Billa vacate their apartment in a hurry, believing that the police are there to arrest them. While looking for a place to stay, they meet Shamsher. Shamsher is also in need of more roommates, so they all move in together. Misunderstandings ensue, resulting in Jinder and Billa being locked up. In the end, the friends help each other out and resolve their problems.

== Cast ==
- Amrinder Gill as Jaswinder Singh 'Jinder'
- Simi Chahal as Swaran Kaur 'Savy'
- Iftikhar Thakur as Chaudhary Shamsher
- Nasir Chinyoti as Tabrez Waseem
- Rup Khatkar as Bal
- Hardeep Gill as Bikkar Chacha
- Akram Udas as Butta Khan
- Gurshabad as Balwinder Singh 'Billa'
- Seema Kaushal as Chachi
- Raj Dhaliwal as Butta's wife
- Sanju Solanki as Billa's father
- Prabhjot Kaur as Chacha's daughter
- Nimrat Khaira as special appearance in song "Baddlan De Kaalje"
- Agha Majid as Waseem (Tabrez's Father)
- Sikander Ghuman

== Soundtrack ==
Chal Mera Putt

Soundtrack album by Dr Zeus
- Released: 2019
- Recorded: 2019
- Genre: Feature film soundtrack
- Label: Rhythm Boyz

Dr Zeus chronology
Laiye Je Yaarian (2019)	Chal Mera Putt (2019)	Chal Mera Putt 2 (2020)

Soundtrack of the film is composed by Dr Zeus and Gurcharan Singh. Background score is also composed by Gurcharan Singh. Lyrics are written by Harmanjeet, Bir Singh, Satta Vairowalia, and Bunty Bains.

=== Track List ===
No.	Title	Lyrics	Music	Singer(s)	Length
1.	"Baddlan De Kaalje"	Bunty Bains	Dr Zeus	Amrinder Gill; Nimrat Khaira	3:18
2.	"Chal Mera Putt (Title Track)"	Satta Vairowalia	Dr Zeus	Amrinder Gill; Gurshabad	2:40
3.	"Aaban De Deson"	Satta Vairowalia	Dr Zeus	Amrinder Gill	2:15
4.	"Shiftaan"	Satta Vairowalia	Dr Zeus	Gurshabad	2:32
5.	"Gallan Na Changian"	Davinder Singh	Dr Zeus	Gurshabad	3:07
6.	"Jithe Malak Rakhda"	Bir Singh	Gurcharan Singh	Bir Singh	2:45

== Production ==
Janjot Singh, Virasat Films, and Tata Benipal started working on Chal Mera Putt, Rakesh Dhawan developed the story and later approached to Rhythm Boyz Entertainment to produce. Amrinder Gill started his filming schedule even before the release of Laiye Je Yaarian. Also, Gill in an interview disclosed that the film is an Indian-Pakistan collaboration and is starring many actors from Pakistan including Iftikhar Thakur, Nasir Chinyoti and Akram Udas. He said, "Our [Indian] films did well in Pakistan like Angrej and their stage dramas are loved in East Punjab. So we went for collaboration." On 2 June 2019, Gill and Simi Chahal were confirmed as lead actors. Gurshabad and Hardeep Gill also play main roles in the film. It marks the feature film directorial debut for Janjot Singh while his first announced film Aahlna is unreleased.

Auditions for the film were held in February 2019 while principal photography of the film took place in single schedule of one month, it began on 25 May 2019 in Birmingham and completed on 26 June 2019 where Sandeep Patil served as cinematographer. Cast of the film spent more than a month in United Kingdom before filming to prepare for their respective characters. Gill in an interview disclosed that filming was initially scheduled for February 2019 but was delayed due to relations between India and Pakistan at the time. The film was edited by Sadik Ali Shaikh and its final cut ran for a total of 123 minutes and 51 seconds.

== Release and marketing ==
Chal Mera Putt was announced by Amrinder Gill in an interview with BBC in May 2019 and was released on 26 July 2019. The film was released in UAE on 1 August 2019. The film was supposed to release in Pakistan but was not able to obtain a release certificate. The All Indian Cine Workers Association asked for the ban on the film in India for violating ban on collaboration with Pakistani artists set by association after 2019 Pulwama attack. However, the film was released on its scheduled date. Jarnail Singh, production supervisor of the film disclosed that team of the film has faced several problems and people had put various allegations on them including some web portals asking for boycott while some calling it anti-national. He added, “it is said that artists don't belong to any religion or boundary, it's their artistry that matters.” The film was made available for streaming on Amazon Prime Video.

== Reception ==
=== Box office ===
Chal Mera Putt was opened at (#6) with A$313,404 and NZ$87,874 at Australia and New Zealand respectively. Also, at the time of release it had a record opening for Punjabi films in Australia for the year. In North America, the film grossed $464,051 in its opening weekend including $153,103 in United States and $310,945 in Canada. In India, the film opened with 63% occupancy at national multiplexes. In United Kingdom, the film grossed £99,293 in its opening weekend. The film grossed over A$530,672 and NZ$144,493 in Australia and New Zealand in its first week. As of its fifth weekend, it became the highest ever grossing Punjabi film at overseas with gross over US$3.6 million, breaking the previous record of Chaar Sahibzaade (2014) which has grossed US$3.57 million in its run. Also, the film became highest-grossing Punjabi film in Australia, Gulf states, and second-highest in United Kingdom and New Zealand.

Territory-wise breakup
Territories	Gross revenue	Opening Weekend
Canada	US$12,85,707 (₹9.26 crore)	US$310,945 (₹2.15 crore)
United States	US$429,716 (₹3.09 crore)	US$153,103 (₹1.06 crore)
Australia	A$943,423 (₹4.58 crore)	A$313,404 (₹1.50 crore)
New Zealand	NZ$221,620 (₹1.02 crore)	NZ$87,874 (₹40.35 lacs)
United Kingdom	£4,12,345 (₹3.61 crore)	£99,293 (84.7 lacs)
Germany	€33,059 (₹26.07 lacs)	
Spain	€36,168 (₹28 lacs)	€18,928 (₹14.51 lacs)
Italy	€56,234 (₹44.8 lacs)	€25,237 (₹19.54 lacs)
Gulf	est.US$3,00,000 (₹2.14 crores)	

=== Critical reception ===
Gurnaaz Kaur of The Tribune gave three stars out of five, praising lead cast, she said, "Amrinder Gill is convincing. He is mostly calm and poised [a requirement of his character]. His innocence and naughtiness is heartening. Simi Chahal, on the other hand, looks her bubbly self and plays her part well; just that she doesn't have that much presence in the movie." She also praised performances from Gurshabad, Hardeep Gill, Iftikhar Thakur, Nasir Chinyoti, Akram Udas and Rup Khatkar. In last added, "The comic timing, the dialogue delivery, the punches— Chal Mera Putt gains on all points."

=== Accolades ===
At PTC Punjabi Film Awards 2020, the film won three awards for Best Comedy Film, Best Debut Director (for Janjot Singh) and Best Actor critics' (for Gill), from six nominations.

== Sequels ==
A sequel Chal Mera Putt 2 was released on 13 March 2020. Another sequel Chal Mera Putt 3 was released on 1 October 2021.

A fourth film in the series, Chal Mera Putt 4 was released in International markets on 1 August 2025. However, the film was not released in India due to controversies related to 2025 India–Pakistan conflict. The film grossed US$1.8 million at the box-office. The film was released on Chaupal on 30 July 2026 in India.
