= Chal Mera Putt 2 =

2020 Indian Punjabi-language comedy-drama film

Chal Mera Putt
- First look poster
- Directed by: Janjot Singh
- Screenplay by: Rakesh Dhawan; Sunil Dhawan
- Story by: Rakesh Dhawan
- Produced by: Karaj Gill; Ashu Munish Sahni
- Starring: Amrinder Gill; Simi Chahal; Garry Sandhu; Rup Khatkar; Iftikhar Thakur; Nasir Chinyoti; Akram Udas; Gurshabad
- Cinematography: Pradeep Khanvilkar
- Edited by: Rohit Dhiman
- Music by: Dr Zeus
- Production companies: Rhythm Boyz Entertainment; Gillz Network; Omjee Star Studios; Phantasy Films Ltd Productions
- Distributed by: Rhythm Boyz
- Release date: 13 March 2020
- Running time: 125 minutes
- Country: India
- Language: Punjabi
- Box office: est. ₹55.41 crore

Chal Mera Putt 2 is a 2020 Indian Punjabi-language comedy drama film directed by Janjot Singh. It is a direct sequel to 2019 film Chal Mera Putt. The film is produced by Karaj Gill under Rhythm Boyz Entertainment and by Ashu Munish Sahni under Omjee Star Studios. It stars Amrinder Gill, Simi Chahal, and Garry Sandhu in lead roles. The film revolves around Punjabis trying hard to make a living in a foreign land. The film also stars Iftikhar Thakur, Rup Khatkar, Nasir Chinyoti, Akram Udas, Zafri Khan, Gurshabad, Hardeep Gill, Nirmal Rishi, and Ruby Anam in supporting roles. The film was followed by direct sequel Chal Mera Putt 3 (2021).

Development of the film began following the success of the prequel, and was announced by Thakur in November 2019. The principal photography of the film began on 12 November 2019 in Birmingham, and ended on 27 December 2019. The film was shot in United Kingdom and India. The film was released worldwide on 13 March 2020. The film was affected in several territories due to outbreak of coronavirus pandemic. The film was re-released worldwide on 27 August 2021.

== Cast ==
- Amrinder Gill as Jaswinder Singh 'Jinder'
- Simi Chahal as Swaran Kaur 'Savy'
- Garry Sandhu as Deepa
- Iftikhar Thakur as Chaudhary Shamsher
- Nasir Chinyoti as Tabrez
- Akram Udas as Boota
- Hardeep Gill as Bikkar Chacha
- Gurshabad as Balwinder Singh 'Billa'
- Rup Khatkar as Bal
- Zafri Khan as Advocate Bilal Randhawa
- Nirmal Rishi as Deepa's aunt
- Agha Majid as Tabrez's father
- Rubi Anam as Saira
- Seema Kaushal as Bikkar's wife
- Sanju Solanki as Billa's father
- Navdeep Brar as Veer
- Raj Dhaliwal as Boota's wife
- Amanat Chan as Mithoo

== Plot ==
The film follows a close-knit group of undocumented Punjabi and Pakistani immigrants living in Birmingham, United Kingdom. The central group includes Jinder, Bikkar Chacha, Billa, Tavrej, Boota, and later Keepa, along with their lawyer Bilal Randhawa. They all struggle with unstable jobs, low wages, and the constant fear of deportation while trying to send money back to their families in Punjab and Pakistan. Despite their hardships, they form a strong friendship and rely on one another for emotional and practical support.

Jinder is one of the central figures in the group and is in a quiet romantic relationship with Savy, a young woman living in the same area. Their relationship develops alongside the struggles of immigrant life, but both remain uncertain about their future due to legal and financial instability. Savy also faces pressure from her family, who expect her to follow traditional arrangements.

The group seeks legal assistance from Bilal Randhawa, a lawyer who agrees to help them apply for residency. However, because Jinder, Bikkar Chacha, Billa, Tavrej, and Boota all lack proper documentation and stable immigration status, their case is complicated and uncertain. While waiting for progress, they continue working low-paying jobs and eventually move into a shared house on Chad Road to reduce expenses and stay together.

Tensions rise when Boota and Tavrej are wrongly implicated in a petrol station robbery after their passports are discovered in a vehicle connected to the crime. Both are arrested, and the incident triggers public backlash against immigrants in general. Although Bilal Randhawa works to defend them, their undocumented status makes their legal situation even more difficult, and they face the risk of deportation. Despite the accusations, Jinder, Bikkar Chacha, Billa, and the rest of the group stand firmly by Boota and Tavrej, refusing to abandon them.

At the same time, Savy learns that her family has arranged her marriage in Punjab. Jinder, feeling that he cannot offer her a stable or secure future due to his financial struggles and uncertain immigration status, reluctantly accepts that they may have to separate. Their emotional farewell highlights the personal cost of their circumstances, and Savy eventually returns to Punjab.

Meanwhile, the group continues to fight for the legal defense of Boota and Tavrej, while also trying to maintain their own fragile lives in Birmingham. The friendship between Jinder, Bikkar Chacha, Billa, Tavrej, Boota, and Keepa remains central, even as pressure from immigration authorities and society increases.

In the end, the legal issues remain unresolved, and the characters are separated by circumstances beyond their control. Jinder eventually returns to Punjab, but he remains emotionally connected to his friends in Birmingham. The film closes on a bittersweet note, emphasizing the enduring friendship, sacrifice, and uncertainty experienced by immigrants living far from home.

== Production ==
After the success of Chal Mera Putt, makers decided to make two sequels to the film. Iftikhar Thakur in an interview disclosed that Zafri Khan and Rubi Anam are also part of cast, and will play pivotal roles in the film. Garry Sandhu was confirmed as a lead actor alongside Amrinder Gill and Simi Chahal following the release of the title poster. Cast and crew of the prequel reprised their roles whereas Sandhu, Khan, Anam and Nirmal Rishi were added to the cast. Sandhu marks his comeback in Punjabi cinema after 6 years with his last film Romeo Ranjha (2014).

Principal photography of the film began on 12 November 2019 in Birmingham and was wrapped on 22 December 2019. The film was shot in United Kingdom and India. First schedule of the filming was completed in London. United Kingdom schedule was wrapped on 27 December 2019. Additional filming took place in January 2020. The film's final dubbing took place in February 2020. The film was edited by Rohit Dhiman and its final cut ran for a total of 124 minutes and 47 seconds. The film is produced by Rhythm Boyz Entertainment in collaboration with Gillz Network, Omjee Star Studios, and Phantasy Films Ltd Productions. Distribution rights were acquired by Omjee Group in India while Rhythm Boyz itself in overseas.

== Soundtrack ==
Chal Mera Putt 2

Soundtrack album by Dr Zeus
- Released: February 2020
- Recorded: 2019
- Genre: Feature film soundtrack
- Label: Rhythm Boyz
- Producer: Karaj Gill

Dr Zeus chronology
Chal Mera Putt (2019)	Chal Mera Putt 2 (2020)	Chal Mera Putt 3 (2021)

The film's soundtrack is composed by Dr Zeus, which includes vocals by Amrinder Gill, Gurshabad, Nimrat Khaira, and Shipra Goyal. Background score is composed by Gurcharan Singh. Lyrics were penned by Satta Vairowalia, Harmanjeet, and Bir Singh. The song "Boota Gaalan Kad Da Ae" was ranked in New Zealand YouTube music weekly chart. The song "Majhe Wal Da" and its music video was praised by critics. The song also featured in Australia and New Zealand YouTube charts.

=== Track List ===
No.	Title	Lyrics	Music	Singer(s)	Length
1.	"Boota Gaalan Kad Da Ae"	Satta Vairowalia	Dr Zeus	Amrinder Gill; Gurshabad	2:25
2.	"Majboori"	Satta Vairowalia	Dr Zeus	Gurshabad	2:33
3.	"Majhe Wal Da"	Laddi Chahal	Desi Crew	Amrinder Gill; Nimrat Khaira	3:18
4.	"Chal Mera Putt 2 (Title Song)"	Satta Vairowalia	Dr Zeus	Amrinder Gill; Gurshabad	2:24
5.	"Sadiyan ton"	Harmanjeet	Dr Zeus	Amrinder Gill	2:47
6.	"Maa Bapu"	Satta Vairowalia	Dr Zeus	Amrinder Gill	2:13
7.	"Russeya karun"	Khushi Pandher	Dr Zeus	Gurshabad; Shipra Goyal	2:48

== Release and marketing ==
The film was released worldwide on 13 March 2020. The film became the biggest Punjabi release ever in United Kingdom and Australia with the screen count over 60 screens. Cast of the film promoted the film in different countries by dividing pairs. Similarly, as the prequel the film is facing difficulties in Pakistan release due to the cultural ban between India and Pakistan in the aftermath of the 2019 Pulwama attack. Discussions were held by the local distributors with government officials and censor board in Pakistan for release of the film. Entertainment Pakistan stated that the film may release in Pakistan following the talks by distributors with government circles. However, the film was not released in Pakistan on scheduled date. On 14 March 2020, cinema halls were ordered to close by Punjab government due to outbreak of coronavirus. Due to shutdown makers have decided to re-release the film worldwide, following the cinema hall opening again.

On 3 February 2020, the film's title poster was released along its release date as 13 March 2020. On 20 February 2020, the first song "Boota Gaalan Kad Da Ae" from the film's soundtrack, sung by Amrinder Gill and Gurshabad was released. The official trailer of the film was released on 23 February 2020. The trailer crossed the million views within eight hours, and 2.7 million views on YouTube within twenty-four hours of its release. On 1 March 2020, the second song "Majboori" from the film, sung by Gurshabad was released. On 11 March 2020, the promotional duet track "Majhe Wal Da", sung by Gill and Nimrat Khaira is releasing. Also, the song "Baddlan De Kaalje" was released in the prequel, which was sung by the same duo. On 12 March 2020, the title track of the film sung by Gill and Gurshabad was released.

The film was released on 13 March 2020 but was pulled out of theaters because of COVID-19 pandemic lockdown in India. In May, it was announced that the film will be re-released once the lockdown will be over. The film was re-released in Dubai on 27 May 2020. When Karaj Gill was asked about releasing the film digitally, he denied and said, "The kind of money OTT platforms offer to regional cinema is not enough to recover the costs. Low-budget films might be able to break even through this, but not us."

The Movie was re-released by many theatres in September 2021.

== Reception ==
=== Box office ===
In India, the film opened at better occupancy than the Bollywood release Angrezi Medium, which was released on same day. The film collected est. ₹80-90 lakhs nett on its first day in India. In India, the film opened with ₹1.24 crore on its opening day, followed by ₹1.52 crore on its second day. However, it collected just ₹16 lakhs on its third day following the cinemas shutdown across Punjab and other states, making the weekend total of ₹2.92 crore. Box Office India estimated its opening weekend as ₹5.38 crore if no shutdown has taken place across the country.

It opened at No. 6 in Australia with grossing A$99,964 and No. 4 in New Zealand with gross of NZ$36,932 on its opening day. In its opening weekend, the film grossed A$391,757 in Australia from 62 screens with a per-screen average of over A$6,300, and finished fifth in the weekend chart. In New Zealand, it finished fourth, grossing NZ$123,300 in its opening weekend. In United States and Canada, the film grossed US$367,000 from 78 theatres, with highest per-screen average of $4,700 in its opening weekend. The weekend was also noteworthy for being the lowest combined-grossing since October 1998, with all films totaling just $55.3 million. According to Bollywood Hungama, the film grossed US$82,935 in United States, US$305,329 in Canada, £87,842 in United Kingdom, and €4,831 in Germany in its opening weekend. The film grossed A$538,073 and NZ$161,574 in its opening week in Australia and New Zealand respectively. As of May 2020, the film has grossed US$76,384 at United Arab Emirates.

The film re-released on 27 August 2021, and collected ₹1.01 crore and 1.15 crore on opening days respectively in India. In United States and Canada, the film grossed $163,000 on its first day with the highest per screen average of $7,462.

== Sequel ==
A sequel Chal Mera Putt 3 was released on 1 October 2021.
