= Vekh Baraatan Challiyan =

2017 Indian romantic comedy film

- Theatrical release poster
- Directed by: Ksshitij Chaudhary
- Written by: Naresh Kathooria
- Produced by: Jaspal Singh Sandhu; Amiek Virk; Karaj Gill
- Starring: Binnu Dhillon; Ranjit Bawa; Amrinder Gill; Kavita Kaushik; Jaswinder Bhalla; Karamjit Anmol
- Edited by: Manish More
- Music by: Jatinder Shah; Gurmoh
- Production companies: Rhythm Boyz Entertainment; Studio; Nadar Films
- Release date: 28 July 2017
- Languages: Punjabi; Haryanvi
- Box office: ₹5.70 crore (domestic)

Vekh Baraatan Challiyan (transl. Look, the wedding procession is leaving/moving) is a 2017 Indian Punjabi romantic comedy film directed by Ksshitij Chaudhary and written by Naresh Kathooria. It has elements of Haryanvi due to the cultural mix in the story. Its principal cast includes Binnu Dhillon, Ranjit Bawa, Kavita Kaushik, Jaswinder Bhalla, and Karamjit Anmol. The film was produced by Karaj Gill, Amiek Virk & Jaspal Singh Sandhu. It was released worldwide on 28 July 2017 and turned out to be a superhit.

== Plot ==
It is the story of Jaggi, a Sikh Jat from Punjab, who falls in love with Sarla, a Hindu Jat girl from Haryana, while being a part-time conductor on a bus owned by his father. When Jaggi along with his family pursues Sarla's family to agree for their marriage, a Pandit declares Jaggi to be Manglik and says that the marriage would result in Sarla's death. On being asked whether there is a way Jaggi could marry Sarla, the Pandit tells that Jaggi would first have to marry a black dog. In spite of his family's resistance, Jaggi agrees to find a black dog and marry it, just to clear his way for marrying Sarla. What follows is a roller-coaster of comic events.

== Cast ==
- Binnu Dhillon as Jagtar Waraich/Jaggi
- Kavita Kaushik as Sarla Dangi
- Amrinder Gill as Subeh (Special Appearance)
- Karamjit Anmol as Resham (Bus Driver)
- Ranjit Bawa as Shindi (Special Appearance)
- Jaswinder Bhalla as Karam Singh Waraich (Jaggi's father)
- Govind Namdev as Jile Singh Dangi (Sarla's father)
- Anupriya Goenka as Saroj (Special Appearance)
- Rupinder Rupi as Gurmeet kaur (Jaggi's mom)
- Gurmeet Saajan as Shindi's father (Jaggi’s Chacha)
- Mithila Purohit as Omni/Omwati (Sarla's friend)
- Parminder Gill as Shindi's mother
- Mukesh Bhatt as Pandit
- Ashok Pathak as Birju

== Box office ==
On its opening day the film grossed ₹1.20 crore in India, making one of the highest Punjabi film opening of 2017. The film collected ₹5.70 crore domestically in its first weekend.
