= Maurh =

2023 film by Jatinder Mauhar

- Directed by: Jatinder Mauhar
- Written by: Jatinder Mauhar
- Produced by: Karaj Gill, Jatin Sethi, Ashish Jain
- Starring: Ammy Virk; Dev Kharoud; Vikramjeet Virk; Kuljinder Singh Sidhu
- Cinematography: Vineet Malhotra
- Music by: Bunty Bains
- Production companies: Rhythm Boyz Entertainment; Naad Sstudios; Miracle Pictures
- Release date: 9 June 2023
- Running time: 140 mins
- Country: India
- Language: Punjabi

Maurh: Lehndi Rutt Di Nayak is a 2023 Indian Punjabi-language period drama film directed by Jatinder Mauhar. The movie stars Ammy Virk, Dev Kharoud and Vikramjeet Virk in the major roles. It was released on June 9, 2023.

== Plot ==
Maurh is based on the lives of Jeon and Kishna Maurh, who had risen against the oppression of both the British and zamindars in pre-partition Punjab. Unable to tolerate humiliation of their family, Kishna joins the bandits. When Kishna is executed by the Brits, Jeona takes up arms to fight for his people. Maurh is a tale of revenge, betrayal and valour.

== Cast ==
- Ammy Virk as Jeona Maurh
- Dev Kharoud as Kishna Maurh
- Vikramjeet Virk as Ahmed Dogar
- Amiek Virk as John Hurton
- Kuljinder Singh Sidhu as Jaimal
- Marc Randhawa as Chatra
- Naiqra Kaur as Parsinni
- Richa Bhatt as Bishni
- Baljinder Kaur as Santi
- Jarnail Singh as Atra
- Sunny Sandhu as Sattu
- Jodhan Raj as Mukandi
- Baljinder singh Darapuri as Vichola
- Sikander Ghuman as Raja Raghbir Singh

== Production ==
The film was earlier titled Jatt Jeona Morh. It was later renamed Maurh. The shooting of the film started in November 2022.

== Release ==
=== Theatrical ===
Maurh was theatrically released on June 9, 2023.

=== Home Video ===
The film is slated for a digital premiere on ZEE5.

== Reception ==
=== Critical ===
The film received mostly positive response from critics. Rating the film 3.5 out of 5, The Indian Express commented, “With mostly light-hearted comedies and dramas to his credit so far, Virk proves that he can shine as an action hero as well.” PTC Punjabi commented, “For those who desire for a thought-provoking and compelling cinematic experience, 'Maurh' is a must-watch.” Kiddaan.com questioned the screenplay of the film.

=== Box Office ===
Despite glowing reviews and a superstar cast, Maurh opened to a lukewarm response at the box office. It collected 2.5 crore in the first weekend.

== Marketing ==
The trailer of the movie was launched on May 28, 2023.

== See also ==
- List of Punjabi films of 2023
