= Chal Mera Putt 3 =

2021 Indian Punjabi-language comedy-drama film

- First look poster
- Directed by: Janjot Singh
- Screenplay by: Rakesh Dhawan
- Produced by: Karaj Gill; Ashu Munish Sahni
- Starring: Amrinder Gill; Simi Chahal; Iftikhar Thakur; Nasir Chinyoti; Rup Khatkar; Akram Udas; Gurshabad
- Cinematography: Sandeep Patil
- Edited by: Parminder Virdi; Sadik Ali Shaikh
- Music by: Dr Zeus; Beat Minister
- Production companies: Rhythm Boyz Entertainment; Gillz Network; Omjee Star Studios; Canvas Creations Ltd
- Distributed by: Rhythm Boyz
- Release date: 1 October 2021
- Running time: 130 minutes
- Country: India
- Language: Punjabi
- Box office: est. ₹35.81 crore

Chal Mera Putt 3 is a 2021 Indian Punjabi-language comedy-drama film directed by Janjot Singh. It is a direct sequel to 2020 film Chal Mera Putt 2. The film is produced by Karaj Gill under Rhythm Boyz Entertainment and by Ashu Munish Sahni under Omjee Star Studios. It stars Amrinder Gill, and Simi Chahal in lead roles. The film revolves around Punjabis trying hard to make a living in a foreign land. The film also stars Iftikhar Thakur, Nasir Chinyoti, Akram Udas, Zafri Khan, Gurshabad, Hardeep Gill, Rup Khatkar, Sajan Abbas and Ruby Anam in supporting roles.

== Cast ==
- Amrinder Gill as Jaswinder Singh 'Jinder'
- Simi Chahal as Swaran Kaur 'Savy'
- Iftikhar Thakur as Chaudhary Shamsher
- Nasir Chinyoti as Tabreez
- Akram Udas as Boota
- Hardeep Gill as Bikkar Chacha
- Rup Khatkar as Bal
- Gurshabad as Balwinder Singh 'Billa'
- Zafri Khan as Advocate Bilal Randhawa
- Agha Majid as Tabreez's father
- Sajan Abbas as Channa
- Ruby Anam as Saaira
- Amanat Chan as Mithoo
- Asad Kaifi
- Karamjit Anmol (special appearance)
- Haroon Rafiq as Wedding guest

== Music ==
The music of the film was composed by Dr Zeus and Beat Minister.

=== Tracklist ===
No.	Title	Lyrics	Music	Singer(s)	Length
1.	"Channa Ve Channa"	Harmanjeet	Dr Zeus	Gurshabad	2:57
2.	"Phull Gende Da"	Beat Minister	Beat Minister	Amrinder Gill, Sanam Marvi	5:02
3.	"Painda Umraan Da"	Satta Vairowalia	Beat Minister	Gurshabad	2:38

== Release ==
=== Theatrical ===
Chal Mera Putt 3 was released on 1 October 2021.

=== Home media ===
The film was digitally released on Chaupal on 11 May 2026.

== Reception ==
In India, the film collected ₹1.30-1.35 crore nett on the opening day, making the record for a post pandemic release. In opening weekend, the film collected ₹4.73 crore nett. In North America, the film grossed $210,000 on its opening day, and $644,000 in its opening weekend. In United Kingdom, it grossed £192,957 in its opening weekend, finishing sixth. The film grossed A$283,610 in Australia and NZ$39,694 in New Zealand, in the first week.

== Sequel ==
A fourth film in the series, Chal Mera Putt 4 was released in International markets on 1 August 2025. However, the film was not released in India due to controversies related to 2025 India–Pakistan conflict. The film grossed US$1.8 million at the box-office. The film was released on Chaupal on 30 July 2026.
