= Janjot Singh =

- Occupation: Film director
- Years active: 2014–present
- Known for: Chal Mera Putt

Janjot Singh is a Punjabi film director associated with Rhythm Boyz Production. He started his career assisting the direction for films Jatt James Bond (2014) and Sardaar Ji (2015), and made his direction debut in 2019 with Chal Mera Putt (2019), which became the highest-grossing Punjabi films overseas. Also, the film was nominated for Best Comedy Film, and Singh was nominated for Best Debut Director at PTC Punjabi Film Awards 2020.

== Filmography ==
=== As director ===
- Shukar Dayteya (2017)
- Chal Mera Putt (2019)
- Chal Mera Putt 2 (2020)
- Chal Mera Putt 3 (2021)
- Any How Mitti Pao (2023)
- Chal Mera Putt 4 (2025)
- Soohe Ve Cheere Waleya (2025)

=== As assistant director ===
- Jatt James Bond (2014)
- Sardaar Ji (2015)
- Munde Kamaal De (2015)
- Saadey CM Saab (2016)
- Sardaar Ji 2 (2016)
- Sat Shri Akaal England (2017)
- Khido Khundi (2018)

== Awards and nominations ==
=== PTC Punjabi Film Awards ===
- Best Comedy Film - Chal Mera Putt - Nominated
- Best Debut Director- Chal Mera Putt - won
