= Ardaas Karaan (film) =

2019 Indian Punjabi-language social drama film

- Theatrical release poster
- Directed by: Gippy Grewal
- Screenplay by: Gippy Grewal; Rana Ranbir
- Story by: Gippy Grewal
- Produced by: Gippy Grewal
- Starring: Gurpreet Ghuggi; Gippy Grewal; Gurfateh Singh Grewal (Shinda Grewal); Japji Khaira; Meher Vij; Yograj Singh
- Cinematography: Baljit Singh Deo
- Edited by: Baljit Singh Deo
- Music by: Jatinder Shah
- Production company: Humble Motion Pictures
- Distributed by: Omjee Group
- Release date: 19 July 2019
- Running time: 140 minutes
- Countries: India; Canada
- Language: Punjabi

Ardaas Karaan is a 2019 Indian Punjabi-language social drama film directed by Gippy Grewal from a screenplay co-written with Rana Ranbir. It is sequel to Ardaas and the second installment in Ardaas series. Produced by Humble Motion Pictures; it stars Gurpreet Ghuggi, Gippy Grewal, Japji Khaira, Meher Vij, and Yograj Singh. The story of the film explores the generation gap and different conflicting opinion about life.

The principal photography of the film began on 12 January 2019 in Surrey, British Columbia, and it was theatrically released on 19 July 2019.

== Cast ==
- Gippy Grewal as Sehaj
- Shinda Grewal as Agam/Jhanda
- Gurpreet Ghuggi as Magic
- Japji Khaira as Binder
- Meher Vij
- Sapna Pabbi
- Rana Ranbir
- Yograj Singh
- Sardar Sohi
- Kuljinder Singh Sidhu
- Malkeet Rauni
- Raghveer Boli

== Soundtrack ==
Soundtrack of the film is composed by Jatinder Shah while the lyrics are written by Happy Raikoti, Ricky Khan, and Rana Ranbir.

No.	Title	Lyrics	Music	Singer(s)	Length
1.	"Satgur Pyare"	Happy Raikoti	Jatinder Shah	Sunidhi Chauhan & Devenderpal Singh	2:56
2.	"Tere Rang Niyare"	Happy Raikoti	Jatinder Shah	Nachhatar Gill	3:19
3.	"Bachpan"	Rana Ranbir	Jatinder Shah	Gippy Grewal	2:42
4.	"Zindagi"	Ricky Khan	Jatinder Shah	Sharry Mann	2:51
5.	"Ardaas Karaan (Male Version)"	Happy Raikoti	Jatinder Shah	Happy Raikoti	6:22
6.	"Ardaas Karaan (Female Version)"	Happy Raikoti	Jatinder Shah	Sunidhi Chauhan	5:06
7.	"Bomb Jigre"	Happy Raikoti	Jatinder Shah	Ranjit Bawa	2:53
8.	"Bandeya"	Ricky Khan	Jatinder Shah	Devenderpal Singh	3:28
Total length:					32:53

== Production ==
Ardaas Karaan was announced by Gippy Grewal in September 2018 as Ardaas 2. In an interview Grewal disclosed the film was earlier titled as Zindabad Yaarian. Auditions for the film were held on early December 2018 whereas principal photography of the film began on 12 January 2019 in Surrey, British Columbia where Baljit Singh Deo served as cinematographer. The film was edited by Baljit Singh Deo and its final cut ran for a total of 140 minutes and 8 seconds.

=== Cast and characters ===
Yograj Singh in a candid conversation with ETimes said, “The part that Malkeet Rauni is playing the movie, (grandfather to Shinda, and an elderly who is very disappointed by the way he is treated by his kids), was written keeping me in mind only. It was sketched for me initially. However, I got busy with some other work and couldn't make it, and then it was passed on to Malkeet Rauni”. Gurpreet Ghuggi’s character wasn't revealed in trailers of the film, Ghuggi described his character as “Magic Singh” and added “[...] if would have been revealed earlier, it would have made things and the movie very clear and predictable. The Chapters (trailers) that we brought forward, only showed certain situations, if the veil would have been taken off from my character, then everything would have been revealed.” Babbal Rai’s character is set in the bygone era and he will be seen in a shade different from his earlier performances, also he called himself as “director’s actor”. Seerat Rana made debut with the film. Gippy Grewal’s younger son Shinda aka Gurfateh Singh also made his debut with the film. Grewal in an interview disclosed that Shinda also gave proper audition for his part in the movie.

== Marketing and release ==
The first look poster of the film was released on 27 May 2019. The poster presents pictures of the cast and release date. Later the official teaser of the film was released on the same day by Saga Music.

The film was released theatrically in India on 19 July 2019.

== Reception ==
=== Critical response ===
The Telegraph Star rated the film 3/5 stars and stated that it was 'wonderfully written', praised the performances of all the actors, and found the music and cinematography as 'top-notch'. In their opinion it was a perfect family entertainer. Manpriya Singh of The Tribune gave 3/5 stars, felt that the film weaved a 'humorous and philosophical narrative'. Singh praised the cinematography of Baljeet Singh Deo, but criticised the slowness of pace of the film. Singh opined, "...the dialogues are repetitively philosophical, circulating around life, love and the like, and only if the humour was used more than heavy-duty philosophical dialogues."

=== Box office ===
Till its second weekend, the film has collected ₹ 6.09 crore in Canada and ₹ 2.27 crore in the United States, whereas in Australasia, it grossed ₹ 3.11 crore in Australia and ₹ 89 lakhs in New Zealand. In Europe, the film managed ₹ 1.05 crore in United Kingdom and ₹ 7.29 lakhs in Germany. In Malaysia, it collected ₹ 8.37 lakhs.

== Sequel ==
Another sequel to Ardaas franchise was announced on 16 November 2020 by Gippy Grewal. The film titled Ardaas Sarbat De Bhale Di to be directed by Gippy Grewal and produced by Gippy Grewal and Ravneet Kaur Grewal, will start filming in 2021.
