= Gurshabad =

Indian actor and singer

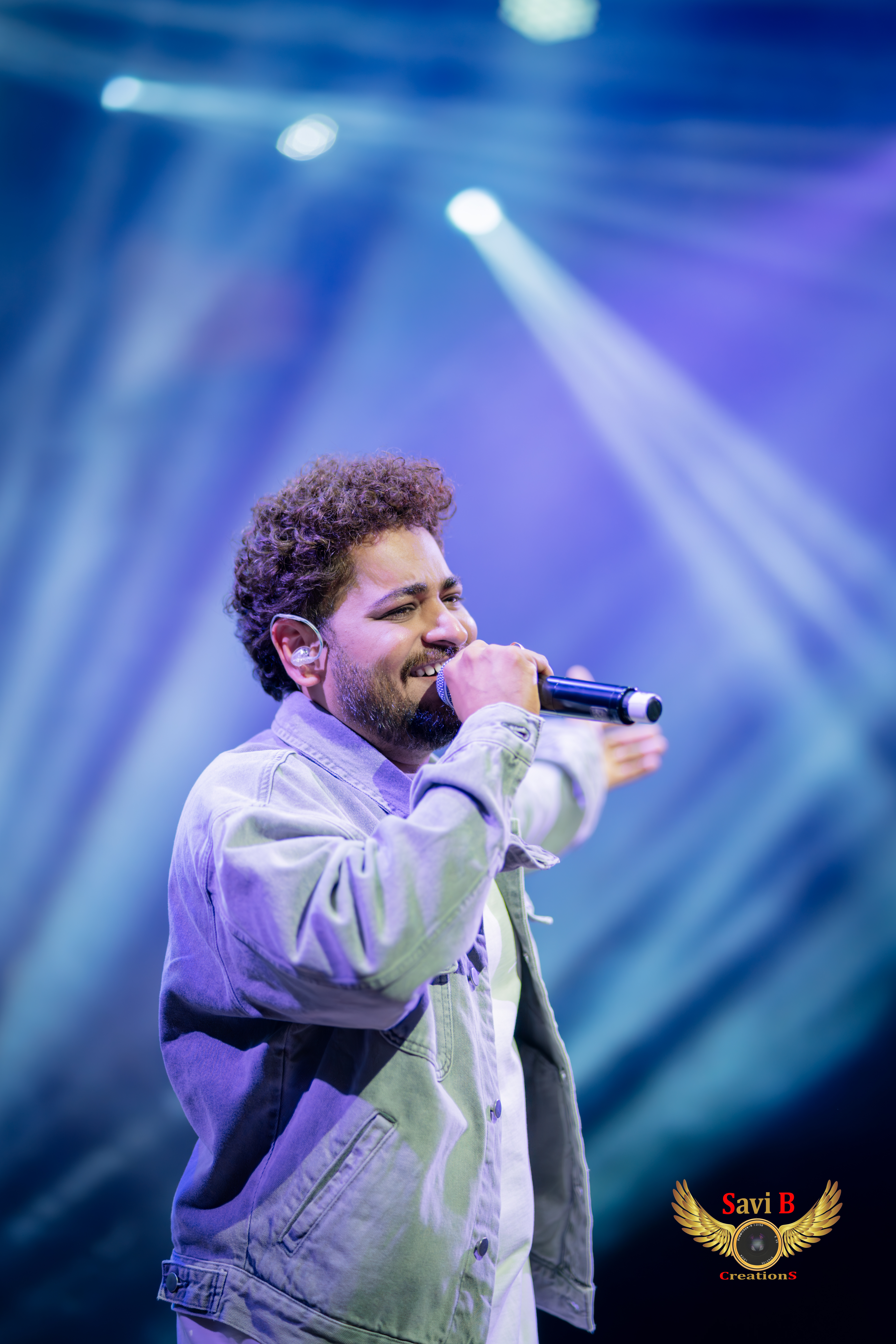
- Gurshabad Kular during 2024 Toronto Concert
- Born: Gurshabad Singh Kular; 24 August 1989 (age 37); Amritsar, Punjab, India
- Other name: Gurshabad Singh
- Education: Khalsa College, Amritsar, Guru Nanak Dev University, Panjab University
- Occupations: Singer; Actor; Live performer
- Years active: 2015-present
- Musical career
- Genres: Playback singing; Folk; Punjabi; Bhangra; Romantic; Pop; Sikh
- Label: PTC Motion Pictures

Gurshabad Singh Kular (born 24 August 1989) is an Indian film actor and playback singer known for his work predominantly in Punjabi cinema and music industry.

== Life and career ==
In September 2015, Gurshabad debuted as a singer with Vaar Bhagat Singh (dedicated to Shaheed Bhagat Singh), a duo collaboration along with Ammy Virk. In the same year, Gurshabad gave his first film appearance in a box-office success Angrej, in which Amrinder Gill played the lead role. After singing singles including Milne Di Rutt (ਮਿਲਣੇ ਦੀ ਰੁੱਤ) (2016), Geetkariyan (ਗੀਤਕਾਰੀਆਂ) (2016), and Tarakiyaan (ਤਰੱਕੀਆਂ) (2017), Gurshabad commenced his playback singing career with a track titled Rajya (ਰਾਜਿਆ) penned by Harman Jeet.

== Discography ==
=== Singles ===
| Year | Song | Record label | Lyricist | Composer(s) |
|---|---|---|---|---|
| 2016 | Milne Di Rutt (ਮਿਲਣੇ ਦੀ ਰੁੱਤ) | Rhythm Boyz Entertainment | Mukhtar | Desi Routz |
| 2016 | Jatta Jaag (ਜੱਟਾ ਜਾਗ) | Raavi Motion Pictures | Shiv Kumar Batalvi | Himself |
| 2017 | Tarakiyaan (ਤਰੱਕੀਆਂ) | Rhythm Boyz Entertainment | Sidhu Sarabjit | Tigerstyle |
| 2017 | Chann Ve (ਚੰਨ ਵੇ) | Rhythm Boyz Entertainment | Harman Jeet | Manpreet |
| 2018 | Taareyaan De Utte (ਤਾਰਿਆਂ ਦੇ ਉੱਤੇ) | DD Punjabi | Harman Jeet | Gurmoh |

== Filmography ==
- Shahkot (film) (2024)
- Chal Mera Putt (2019)
- Chal Mera Putt 2 (2020)
- Chal Mera Putt 3 (2021)
- Chal Mera Putt 4 (2025)
- Angrej (2015)
