= Amrinder Gill discography =

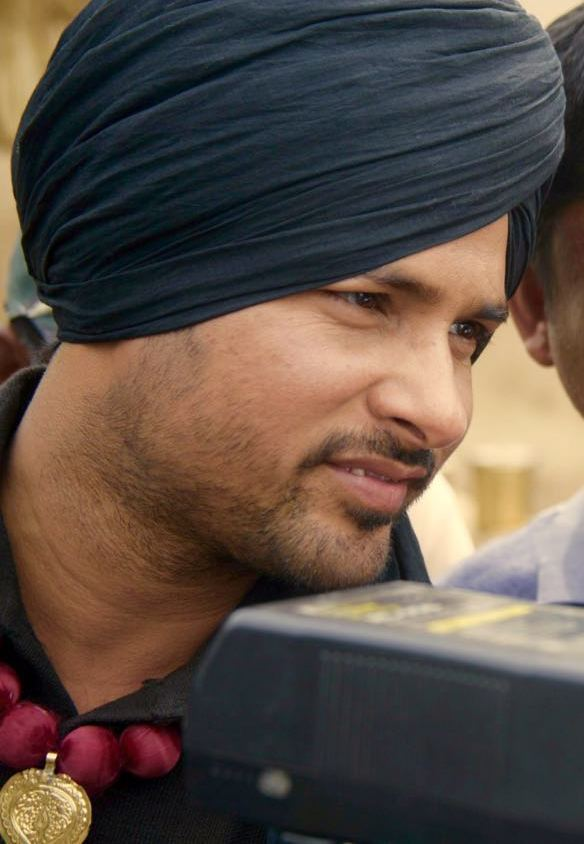
- Studio albums: 9
- Singles: 15
- Film soundtracks: 57

Indian actor, singer, songwriter, and film producer Amrinder Gill has released over eight studio albums, fifteen singles, and fifty-seven songs in film soundtracks. He made his singing debut in 1999, in program Kala Doria with his track "Sanu Ishq Ho Gaya" on Jalandhar Doordarshan.

Gill's debut album, Apni Jaan Ke, was released by Goyal Music in 2000. The album was followed by Chan Da Tukda and Ek Vaada, which were released by Finetouch next years consequently. In 2005, Gill released his fourth studio album Dildarian under label Music Waves and Kamlee Records. The album received various nominations at ETC Awards.

== Studio albums ==
Title	Album details	Peak chart positions	Notes
Title	Album details	CAN	Notes
Apni Jaan Ke	Released: 1 January 2000; Label: Goyal Music; Format: CD, digital download, streaming	—	Music : Sukhpal Sukh
Chan Da Tukda	Released: 30 November 2001; Label: Finetouch; Format: CD, digital download, streaming	—	Music : Sukhpal Sukh
Ek Vaada	Released: 1 March 2002; Label: Finetouch; Format: CD, digital download, streaming	—	Music: Gurmeet Singh
Dildarian	Released: 31 March 2005; Label: Kamlee Records, Music Waves; Format: CD, digital download, streaming	—	Music : Sukshinder Shinda
Ishq	Released: 6 September 2007; Label: Kamlee Records, Planet Recordz, Speed Records; Format: CD, digital download, streaming	—	Music : Sukshinder Shinda
Dooriyan	Released: 20 November 2009; Label: Kamlee Records, Planet Recordz, Speed Records; Format: CD, digital download, streaming	—	Music : Sukshinder Shinda
Judaa	Released: 19 November 2011; Label: Envy Entertainment, Music Waves, Speed Records; Format: CD, digital download, streaming	—	Music : Dr Zeus; Brit Asia Award for Best Album; PTC Award for Best Romantic Ballad
Judaa 2	Released: 24 January 2014; Label: Speed Records, Times Music, Rhythm Boyz; Format: CD, digital download, streaming	—	Music : Dr Zeus; PTC Award for Best Album
Judaa 3 Chapter 1	Released: 1 September 2021; Label: Rhythm Boyz; Format: CD, digital download, streaming	61	Music : Dr Zeus
Judaa 3 Chapter 2	Released: 24 May 2024; Label: Rhythm Boyz; Format: CD, digital download, streaming		Music : Dr Zeus

== Singles ==
List of singles as lead artist, with selected chart positions, showing year released and album name
Title	Year	Peak chart positions	Music	Lyrics	Notes	Album
Title	Year	UK Asian (OCC)	Music	Lyrics	Notes	Album
"Ki Samjhaiye" (featuring Dr Zeus)	2011	6	Dr . Zeus	Nimma Loharka		Judaa
"Yarrian" (featuring Dr Zeus and Shortie)	2011	13	Dr . Zeus	Bilal Saeed		Judaa
"Judaa" (featuring Dr Zeus)	2011	21	Dr . Zeus	Raj Kakra	Winner- Most Romantic Ballad of the year at PTC Awards	Judaa
"Mera Deewanapan" (featuring Dr Zeus)	2014	1	Dr . Zeus	Jit Salala	Nominated- Most Popular Song of the year at PTC Awards	Judaa 2
"Pendu" (featuring Dr Zeus and Young Fateh)	2014	38	Dr . Zeus	Alfaaz		Judaa 2
"Baapu" (featuring Jatinder Shah)	2014	—	Jatinder Shah	Happy Raikoti		—N/a
"Kurta Suha" (featuring Jatinder Shah)	2015	17	Jatinder Shah	Happy Raikoti		Angrej
"Family Di Member" (featuring Jatinder Shah)	2015	34	Jatinder Shah	Jaggi Jagowal		Angrej
"Supna" (featuring B Praak)	2015	—	B Praak	Jaani		—N/a
"Heerey" (featuring Jatinder Shah)	2016	16	Jatinder Shah	Bir Singh		Love Punjab
"Goriyan Bhavaan" (featuring Jatinder Shah)	2016	34	Jatinder Shah	Bittu Cheema		Love Punjab
"Soorjan Wale" (featuring Ammy Virk & Nimrat Khaira)	2020	—	Lowkey	Bittu Cheema		—N/a
"Chal Jindiye"	2021		Dr.Zeus	Bir Singh		Judaa 3 Chapter One
"Adore"	2022		Lowkey	Rav Hanjra		—N/a
Ocean eyes	2023		Lowkey	Amrinder gill		

=== As featured artist ===
List of guest appearances, showing song title, year released, other artists and album name
Title	Year	Artist(s)	Album
"Khedan De Din"	2005	Jaidev Kumar, Sunidhi Chauhan	Yaraan Naal Baharaan
"Par Langah De"	2006	Simon Nandhra	Silent Tears
"Tu Hi Tu"	2009	Sukhshinder Shinda	Collaborations 2
"2 Number"	2012	Bilal Saeed, Dr Zeus	Twelve

=== As executive producer ===
Year	Song	Singer	Record label
2019	Nanak Aadh Jugaadh Jiyo	Diljit Dosanjh	Rhythm Boyz

== Film soundtrack ==
Film	Year	Song	Music	Lyrics
Munde U.K. De	2009	Ishq Ho Gaya	Sukhshinder Shinda & Babloo Kumar	Amarjit Musapuria
Munde U.K. De	2009	Dil Milyan De Mele	Sukhshinder Shinda & Babloo Kumar	Babu Singh Maan
Taur Mittran Di	2012	Assi Munde Haan Punjab	Jaidev Kumar	Jaggi Singh
Taur Mittran Di	2012	Darshan Di Bukh	Jaidev Kumar	Jaggi Singh
Taur Mittran Di	2012	Nai Rukna	Jaidev Kumar	Jaggi Singh
Taur Mittran Di	2012	Taur Mittran Di	Jaidev Kumar	Jaggi Singh
Taur Mittran Di	2012	Dil Tera Ho Gaya	Jaidev Kumar	Rajesh Chalotra
Tu Mera 22 Main Tera 22	2013	Main Naiyo Jaana	Yo Yo Honey Singh	Alfaaz
Tu Mera 22 Main Tera 22	2013	Wakh	Yo Yo Honey Singh	Alfaaz
Tu Mera 22 Main Tera 22	2013	Sargi	Yo Yo Honey Singh	Alfaaz
Tu Mera 22 Main Tera 22	2013	Dance to the Beat	Yo Yo Honey Singh	Alfaaz
Tu Mera 22 Main Tera 22	2013	Maula Jaane	Yo Yo Honey Singh	Alfaaz
Saadi Love Story	2013	Rubaroo	Jaidev Kumar	Kumaar
Daddy Cool Munde Fool	2013	Lagda Naa Jee	Dr Zeus	Nimma Loharka
Daddy Cool Munde Fool	2013	Sohni Lagdi Tun	Dr Zeus	Nimma Loharka
Daddy Cool Munde Fool	2013	Pawareh	Dr Zeus	Nimma Loharka
Goreyan Nu Daffa Karo	2014	Goreyan Nu Daffa Karo	Jatinder Shah	Kumaar
Goreyan Nu Daffa Karo	2014	Laazmi Dil Da	Jatinder Shah	Kumaar
Goreyan Nu Daffa Karo	2014	Chandi Ae Jawani	Jatinder Shah	Veet Baljit
Goreyan Nu Daffa Karo	2014	Bapu	Jatinder Shah	Happy Raikoti
Happy Go Lucky	2014	Vichhoda	Jatinder Shah	Kumaar
Happy Go Lucky	2014	Neendran	Jatinder Shah	Kumaar
Angrej	2015	Mil Ke Baithange	Jatinder Shah	Vinder Nathumajra
Angrej	2015	Kurta Suha	Jatinder Shah	Happy Raikoti
Angrej	2015	Family Di Member	Jatinder Shah	Jaggi Jagowal
Angrej	2015	Chete Kar Kar Ke	Jatinder Shah	Happy Raikoti
Angrej	2015	Vanjhali Vaja	Jatinder Shah	Happy Raikoti & Traditional
Angrej	2015	Tappe	Jatinder Shah	Happy Raikoti
Channo Kamli Yaar Di	2016	Tere Bagair	Jatinder Shah	Kumaar
Love Punjab	2016	Heerey	Jatinder Shah	Bir Singh
Love Punjab	2016	Shaan Vakhri	Jatinder Shah	Veet Baljit
Love Punjab	2016	Zindagi	Jatinder Shah	Raj Kakra
Love Punjab	2016	Goriya Bahavan	Jatinder Shah	Bittu Cheema
Bambukat	2016	Jind	Jatinder Shah	Charan Likhari
Sarvann	2017	Ni Mainu	Jatinder Shah	Happy Raikoti
Lahoriye	2017	Akhar	Jatinder Shah	Surinder Sadhpuri
Lahoriye	2017	Chunni	Jatinder Shah	Preet Mangat
Lahoriye	2017	Jeeondean Ch	Jatinder Shah	Fateh Shergill
Lahoriye	2017	Paani Raavi Da	Jatinder Shah	Harmanjeet
Lahoriye	2017	Gutt Ch Lahore	Jatinder Shah	Harmanjeet
Vekh Baraatan Challiyan	2017	Sukh Da Saah	Jatinder Shah	Vinder Nathumajra
Golak Bugni Bank Te Batua	2018	Aisi Taisi	Jatinder Shah	Sabir Ali Sabir
Golak Bugni Bank Te Batua	2018	Lakh Waari	Jatinder Shah	Happy Raikoti
Daana Paani	2018	Daana Paani	Jatinder Shah	Bir Singh
Ashke	2018	Leekan	Jatinder Shah	Raj Ranjodh
Ashke	2018	Jugni	Jatinder Shah	
Bhajjo Veero Ve	2018	Car Reebna Wali	Jatinder Shah	Satta Vairowalia
Bhajjo Veero Ve	2018	Chhade	Jatinder Shah	Satta Vairowalia
Laiye Je Yaarian	2019	Kurti De Mor	Jatinder Shah	Harmanjeet
Laiye Je Yaarian	2019	Darshan Mehnge	Intense	Harmanjeet
Laiye Je Yaarian	2019	Mathi Mathi	Dr Zeus	Bir Singh
Chal Mera Putt	2019	Baddlan De Kaalje	Dr Zeus	Bunty Bains
Chal Mera Putt	2019	Chal Mera Putt (Title Track)	Dr Zeus	Satta Vairowalia
Chal Mera Putt	2019	Aaban De Deson	Dr Zeus	Satta Vairowalia
Chal Mera Putt 2	2020	Boota Gaalan Kad Da Ae	Dr Zeus	Satta Vairowalia
Chal Mera Putt 2	2020	Majhe Vall Da	Desi Crew	Laddi Chahal
Chal Mera Putt 2	2020	Chal Mera Putt 2 (Title Track)	Dr Zeus	Satta Vairowalia
Chal Mera Putt 2	2020	Sadiyan Ton	Anamik Chauhan, Dr Zeus	Harmanjeet
Chal Mera Putt 2	2020	Maa Baap	Dr Zeus	Satta Vairowalia
Chal Mera Putt 3	2021	Phull Gende Da	Beat Minister	Beat Minister
Saade Aale	2022	Yaar Vichre	Mukhtar Sahota	Binder Pal Fateh
Chhalla Mud Ke Nahi Aaya	2022	Chhalla Mud ke Nahi Aaya (Title track)	Lowkey	Bir Singh
Chhalla Mud Ke Nahi Aaya	2022	Dubda Sooraj	Lowkey	Bir Singh
Chhalla Mud Ke Nahi Aaya	2022	Baagh	Lowkey	Bir Singh
Chhalla Mud Ke Nahi Aaya	2022	Doongiyan Baatan	Lowkey	Hardeep Singh Maan
Chhalla Mud Ke Nahi Aaya	2022	Mulk	Lowkey	Raj Kakra
Annhi Dea Mazaak Ae	2023	Akhian Nimanian	VS5 Music	Nimma Loharka
Annhi Dea Mazaak Ae	2023	Bahut Nede	VS5 Music	Raj Fatehpur
Jodi	2023	Jind	Gurmeet Singh	Harmanjeet
Maurh	2023	Nigah	Bunty Bains	Bunty Bains
Kade Dade Diyan Kade Pote Diyan	2023	Kora Kujja	Jatinder Shah	D Harp
Daaru Na Peenda Hove	2024	Tasveeran	Lowkey	Alfaaz
