= List of awards and nominations received by Amrinder Gill =

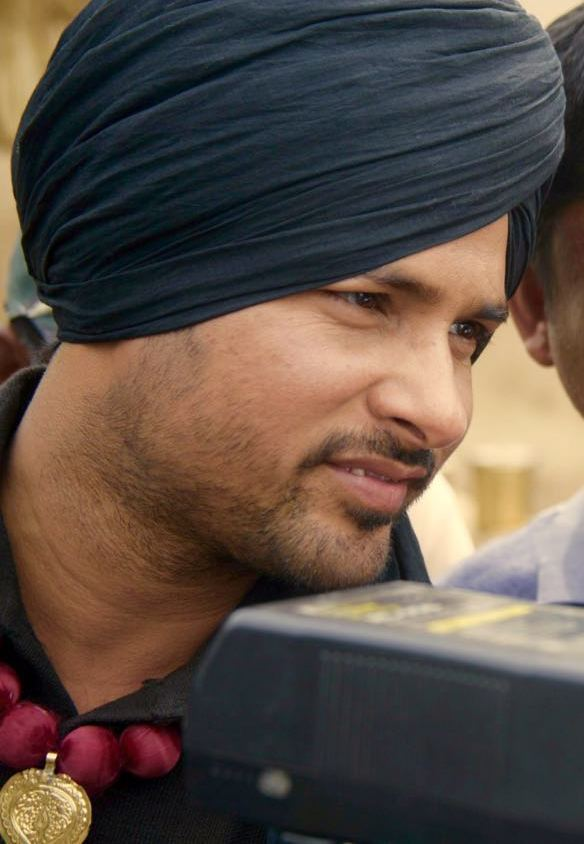
- Gill on the set of Angrej
Awards and nominations
Award	Wins	Nominations
PTC Punjabi Film Awards	7	24
Filmfare Punjabi Awards	2	5
PTC Punjabi Music Awards	4	11
Brit Asia TV Film Awards	0	4
Brit Asia TV Music Awards	1	2
Virasat Film Awards	1	0
ETC Punjabi Music Awards	0	3

Totals (Note: Certain award groups do not simply award one winner. They acknowledge several different recipients, have runners-up, and have third place. Since this is a specific recognition and is different from losing an award, runner-up mentions are considered wins in this award tally. For simplification and to avoid errors, each award in this list has been presumed to have had a prior nomination.)
- Wins: 16
- Nominations: 50

Amrinder Gill is an Indian actor known for his work in Punjabi cinema and Punjabi music. In 2016, Gill won his first PTC Award for Best Actor for Angrej (2015), followed by Love Punjab (2016) and Lahoriye (2018).

== PTC Punjabi Film Awards ==
Year	Nominated work	Category	Result	Ref.
2011	Ik Kudi Punjab Di	Best Actor	Nominated	
2011	"Sochan Vich Tu"	Best Playback Singer (Male)	Nominated	
2013	Taur Mittran Di	Best Actor	Nominated	
2013	"Dil Tera Hoya"	Best Playback Singer (Male)	Nominated	
2014	Daddy Cool Munde Fool	Best Actor	Nominated	
2014	"Wakh"	Most Popular Song of the Year	Won	
2014	"Sargi"	Best Playback Singer (Male)	Nominated	
2015	Goreyan Nu Daffa Karo	Best Actor	Nominated	
2015	"Goreyan Nu Daffa Karo"	Most Popular Song of the Year	Nominated	
2016	Angrej	Best Actor	Won	
2016	"Kurta Suha"	Best Playback Singer (Male)	Nominated	
2016	"Vanjhali Vaja"	Best Playback Singer (Male)	Nominated	
2016	"Kurta Suha"	Most Popular Song of the year	Nominated	
2016	"Vanjhali Vaja"	Most Popular Song of the year	Nominated	
2017	Love Punjab	Best Actor	Won	
2017	"Heerey"	Best Playback Singer (Male)	Won	
2018	Lahoriye	Best Actor	Won	
2018	"Akhar"	Best Playback Singer (Male)	Nominated	
2019	Ashke	Best Actor	Nominated	
2019	Ashke	Best Actor Critics'	Won	
2019	"Aisi Taisi"	Best Playback Singer (Male)	Nominated	
2020	Laiye Je Yaarian	Best Actor	Nominated	
2020	Laiye Je Yaarian	Best Actor Critics'	Won	
2020	"Aaban De Deson"	Best Playback Singer (Male)	Nominated	

== Filmfare Awards Punjabi ==
Year	Nominated work	Category	Result	Ref.
2017	Love Punjab	Best Actor	Nominated	
2017	"Bade Chaava Naal"	Best Playback Singer (Male)	Nominated	
2017	"Jind"	Best Playback Singer (Male)	Nominated	
2018	Lahoriye	Best Actor	Won	
2018	"Akhar"	Best Playback Singer (Male)	Won	

== PTC Punjabi Music Awards ==
Year	Nominated work	Category	Result	Ref.
2010	Dooriyan	Best Folk Pop Album	Nominated	
2010	Tera Bina	Best Pop Vocalist Male	Nominated	
2012	Ki Samjhaiye	Most Popular Song of the Year	Nominated	
2012	Ki Samjhaiye	Best Pop Vocalist (Male)	Nominated	
2012	Judaa	Best Album	Nominated	
2012	Judaa	Most Romantic Ballad of the Year	Won	
2015	Judaa 2	Best Album of the Year	Won	
2015	Judaa 2	Best Pop Vocalist Male For an Album	Won	
2015	Diary	Best Music Video	Won	
2015	Diary	Best Romantic Ballad	Nominated	
2015	Mera Deewanapan	Most Popular Song of the Year	Nominated	

== Brit Asia Film Awards ==
Year	Nominated work	Category	Result	Ref.
2018	Lahoriye	Best Actor	Nominated	
2018	"Akhar"	Best Playback Singer (Male)	Nominated	
2019	Ashke	Best Actor	Nominated	
2019	Golak Bugni Bank Te Batua	Best Supporting Actor	Nominated	

== Brit Asia TV Music Awards ==
Year	Nominated work	Category	Result	Ref.
2012	Judaa	Best Album of the Year	Won	
2012	—N/a	Best International Act	Nominated	
