= Amberdeep Singh =

Indian actor and director

- Born: 13 December 1979 (age 46)
- Education: Punjabi University
- Occupations: Screenwriter; director; actor
- Years active: 2014–present
- Known for: Angrej; Lahoriye; Laung Laachi

Amberdeep Singh is an Indian actor, director, screenwriter and producer associated with Punjabi films.

== Life and career ==
Singh did his schooling at Government Senior Secondary School in Abohar and then studied business at DAV College, Abohar. Afterwards, he pursued a master's degree in theatre and television from Punjabi University, Patiala before moving to Mumbai in 2001. His father is a journalist. In an interview, Singh disclosed that he went in order to become an actor and ended up writing dialogues and scripts for comedy shows. He has worked in Comedy Nights with Kapil and Comedy Circus. He has won five awards for his direction, screenwriting, and stories. In 2015, he won the Best Screenplay award at PTC Punjabi Film Awards for writing the screenplay of Goreyan Nu Daffa Karo. In 2016, he won two awards for Angrej: Best Screenplay and Best Story. In 2018, he won the Best Debut Director award at Filmfare Punjabi Awards and Best Director Award at PTC Film Awards for his directorial debut, Lahoriye.

He has also made cameo appearances in the films Love Punjab, Sarvann, Lahoriye, Harjeeta, and Ashke. He made his debut as a lead actor in Laung Laachi with Neeru Bajwa, followed by Bhajjo Veero Ve in 2018.

== Filmography ==
Key
†	Denotes films that have not yet been released

Year	Film	Actor	Director	Dialogues	Screenwriter	Producer	Notes	Ref
2008	Chak De Phatte	—N/a	—N/a	Yes	Yes	—N/a	Co-Screenwriter with Naresh Kathooria and Smeep Kang, Co-Dialogue Writer with Naresh Kathooria	
2013	Jatt & Juliet 2	—N/a	—N/a	Yes	No	—N/a	Co-Dialogue Writer with Anurag Singh	
2013	Viyah 70 km	—N/a	—N/a	No	Yes	—N/a	Co-Screenwriter with Naresh Kathooria and Mushtaq Pasha	
2013	Daddy Cool Munde Fool	—N/a	—N/a	Yes	Yes	—N/a	Co-Screenwriter with Rajan Aggarwal	
2014	Happy Go Lucky	—N/a	—N/a	Yes	Yes	—N/a	Co-Screenwriter with Rajan Aggarwal	
2014	Goreyan Nu Daffa Karo	—N/a	—N/a	Yes	Yes	—N/a	Won award for best screenplay	
2014	Disco Singh	—N/a	—N/a	Yes	No	—N/a	Co-Dialogue Writer with Anurag Singh	
2015	Angrej	—N/a	—N/a	Yes	Yes	—N/a	Won award for best screenplay and story	
2016	Love Punjab	Pargat's Assistant	—N/a	Yes	Yes	—N/a		
2017	Sarvann	Taxi driver	—N/a	Yes	Yes	—N/a	Concept - Karaan Guliani	
2017	Lahoriye	Taufiq	Yes	Yes	Yes	Yes	Best debut director filmfare award/Best director award at PTC Punjabi Film Awards	
2018	Laung Laachi	Mehnga	Yes	Yes	Yes	Yes	Won Best Debut Actor Awards at PFA	
2018	Harjeeta	Coach	No	No	No	No	Special appearance as coach	
2018	Ashke	Noor's brother	Yes	Yes	No	No	Co-Dialogue Writer with Dheeraj Rattan	
2018	Bhajjo Veero Ve	Bhoora	Yes	Yes	Yes	No		
2019	Laiye Je Yaarian	Binder	No	Yes	No	No	Co-Dialogue Writer with Dheeraj Rattan	
2022	Saunkan Saunkne	No	No	No	Yes	No		
2022	Sohreyan Da Pind Aa Gaya	No	No	Yes	Yes	No		
2022	Chhalla Mud Ke Nahi Aaya	No	No	Yes	Yes	No		
2022	Laung Laachi 2	Mehnga	Yes	Yes	Yes	No	Co-Story Writer and Co-Screenwriter with Amit Sumit, Khushbir Makna and Amandeep Kaur	
2023	Jodi	No	Yes	Yes	Yes	No		
2024	Jatt Nuu Chudail Takri	No	No	Yes	Yes	No		
