= Allahr Vres =

2024 Punjabi-language film by Shivamm Sharma

- Directed by: Shivamm Sharma
- Written by: Jass Brar, Bhawani Shankar Sharma, Hanspal Singh
- Produced by: Dave Sidhu, Jujhar Singh, Manjot Singh
- Starring: Armaan Bedil, Janvir Kaur, Jimmy Sharma
- Cinematography: Vishwanath Prajapati
- Edited by: Krishna Rodge
- Production companies: Top Hills Movies; Aarnika Productions
- Release date: 7 June 2024
- Country: India
- Language: Punjabi

Allahr Vres is a 2024 Indian Punjabi-language film directed by Shivamm Sharma, featuring Armaan Bedil, Jaanvir Kaur, Jimmy Sharma, Kavi Singh and Nirmal Rishi in lead roles. The film was set for release on 31 May 2024.

== Cast ==
- Armaan Bedil
- Jaanvir Kaur
- Jimmy Sharma
- Nirmal Rishi
- Raj Dhaliwal
- Shavinder Mahal
- Kavi Singh

== Release ==
The film was initially planned for release on 31 May 2024 but the makers later announced 7 June 2024 as the new release date.
