= Sardar Sohi =

Indian actor

- Born: Paramjit Singh Sohi; 20 November 1946 (age 80); Tibba, Tehsil Dhuri, Sangrur
- Occupation: Actor
- Years active: 1978–present

Parmjeet Singh Sohi, popularly known as Sardar Sohi, is an Indian actor and writer who works in Punjabi cinema. He is from Palasaur near Dhuri, Punjab. He is best known for the films The Legend of Bhagat Singh and Ardaas. Sohi started his Punjabi film career with Long Da Lishkara, which was released in 1986.

== Filmography ==
Year	Film	Role
1986	Long Da Lishkara	Naahra
1988	Waaris	Hawaldar Haridaymal Murari Lal
1988	Suhag Churha	Amli
1990	Pyaasi Nigahen	Dumroo Baba
1991	Udeekan Saun Dian	Vishnu Deva; Deewana
1991	Ramakant Sahai	Secretary
1991	Diva Bale Saari Raat	Dharma
1993	Divya Shakti	
1995	Khel Takdeeran De	Kaana Succha
1999	Parkh	
2002	The Legend of Bhagat Singh	Leader in Jallianwala
2003	Hawayein	
2004	Sambandh	
2006	Baghi	Jwala Singh
2007	Kaafila	Rashid Khan
2009	Lagda Ishq Hogaya	JP
2010	Mitti	Harmail Singh
2011	Jihne Mera Dil Lutteya	
2012	Kabaddi Once Again	
2012	Carry On Jatta	
2012	Aive Roula Pai Geya	Mukhtiar
2013	Singh vs Kaur	
2013	Pooja Kiven AA	
2013	Daddy Cool Munde Fool	Khadak Singh
2013	Bikkar Bai Sentimental	
2013	Jatts in Golmaal	
2013	Oye Hoye Pyar Ho Gaya	
2013	Punjab Bolda	Gurbaaz's grandfather
2013	Jatt Boyz	Putt Jattan De
2013	Harnama	Seerat's father
2013	Haani	Rashpal
2014	Kaum De Heere	Bhai Kehar Singh
2014	Patiala Dreamz	Teja Singh
2014	Jatt James Bond	
2014	Oh My Pyo	Khunkhaar Singh
2014	Goreyan Nu Daffa Karo	Bhujjowala Fuffar
2014	Baaz	
2015	Angrej	Maado's grandfather
2015	Judge Singh LLB	T. S. Brar
2016	Ardaas	Sohi Sahib
2016	Pindaan Vicho Pind Suni Daa	
2016	Dulla Bhatti	Jagir Singh
2016	25 Kille	Kartar Singh
2016	Bambukat	Pakko's uncle
2016	Sardar Saab	
2017	Manje Bistre	
2017	Lahoriye	Harbans Singh – Kikkar's father
2017	Toofan Singh	Sewak Singh
2017	Saab Bahadar	Jarnail Singh
2017	Jora 10 Numbaria	Baghel Singh
2017	Nikka Zaildar 2	Gurditt Singh – Nikka's grandfather
2017	Dangar Doctor Jelly	Meghnath Sharma
2017	Sardar Mohammad	Colonel Harjit Singh Takhar
2017	Sat Shri Akaal England	German's father
2018	Bhagat Singh Di Udeek	
2018	Jagga Jiunda E	
2018	Asees	
2018	Aate Di Chidi	Dilip Singh
2018	Parahuna	
2019	Subedar Joginder Singh	Major B. N. Mehta
2019	Singham	
2021	Jamraud	Amar Singh

== Awards and nominations ==
Year	Film	Award ceremony	Category	Result
2011	Mitti	PTC Punjabi Film Awards	Best Negative Role	Won
2013	Raula Pai Gaya	PTC Punjabi Film Awards	Best Negative Role	Nominated
2016	Judge Singh LLB	PTC Punjabi Film Awards	Best Negative Role	Nominated
2017	Dulla Bhatti	PTC Punjabi Film Awards	Best Negative Role	Won
2017	Ardaas	Filmfare Awards Punjabi	Best Actor in Supporting Role	Nominated
2018	Sardar Mohammad	Filmfare Awards Punjabi	Best Actor in Supporting Role	Nominated
