= Judaa =

2011 studio album by Amrinder Gill

Studio album by Amrinder Gill
- Released: 19 November 2011
- Genre: Pop
- Length: 37:52
- Label: Envy; Music Waves; Speed; Times
- Producer: Dr Zeus

Amrinder Gill chronology
Dooriyan (2009)	Judaa (2011)	Judaa 2 (2014)

Judaa is the seventh studio album by Indian singer Amrinder Gill, released on 5 November 2011, by Envy Entertainment, Music Waves, Speed Records and Times Music. The album was produced by Dr Zeus. The lyrics were penned by Bilal Saeed, Raj Kakra, and Nimma Loharka. The album was followed by Judaa 2 (2014), which featured mostly similar artists.

The album was commercial success; songs "Judaa", "Ki Samjhaiye" and "Yarrian" were well received by audience. The album won numerous awards including Best Album at Brit Asia Music Awards and Best Romantic Ballad at PTC Punjabi Music Awards. Three songs from the album, "Ki Samjhaiye", "Yarrian", and "Judaa" peaked in UK Asian music weekly charts by Official Charts Company.

== Track listing ==
No.	Title	Lyrics	Music	Length
1.	"Asi Gabru Punjabi"	Bilal Saeed	Dr Zeus	3:48
2.	"Judda"	Raj Kakra	Dr Zeus	5:29
3.	"Ki Samjiye"	Nimma Loharka	Dr Zeus	4:44
4.	"Ki Samjiye" (Unplugged)	Nimma Loharka	Dr Zeus	4:27
5.	"Mirza"		Dr Zeus	3:15
6.	"Mitran Da Dil"		Dr Zeus	4:28
7.	"Naajra"	Raj Kakra	Dr Zeus	4:21
8.	"Tere Raah"		Dr Zeus	3:12
9.	"Tere Utte"		Dr Zeus	4:08
Total length:				37:52

== Reception ==
Three songs "Ki Samjhaiye", "Yarrian", and "Judaa" from the album peaked on the UK Asian Music chart by Official Charts Company. The album topped iTunes World Albums charts in United Kingdom, Australia, and Canada.

== Charts ==
Title	Chart (2011–12)	Peak position
"Ki Samjhaiye"	UK Asian (OCC)	6
"Yarrian"	UK Asian (OCC)	13
"Judaa"	UK Asian (OCC)	21

== Accolades ==
- Best Album - Brit Asia Music Awards 2012
