= Filmfare Awards Punjabi =

Award ceremony for Punjabi language films

- Awarded for: Excellence in Punjabi cinema
- Country: India
- Presented by: Filmfare
- First award: 31 March 2017
- Final award: present
- Website: www.filmfare.com

Filmfare Awards Punjabi are presented to the best films, performers and artists that work in Punjabi cinema. The event was first held in 2017.

== History ==
The first awards ceremony was held on 31 March 2017 in Mohali. It became the second film award for Punjabi films after PTC Punjabi Film Awards, which was introduced in 2011.

Jitesh Pillai said, “It is a moment of utmost pride as we witness Filmfare Awards expand its footprints across the nation. The inaugural Filmfare Awards Punjabi ceremony was organized to celebrate achievements in the Punjabi film industry and brought together artists, filmmakers, and industry professionals.

== Editions ==
Year	Ceremony	Ref
2017	1st Filmfare Awards Punjabi	
2018	2nd Filmfare Awards Punjabi	
2025	3rd Filmfare Awards Punjabi	

== Categories ==
=== Merit Awards ===
- Best Film
- Best Actor
- Best Actress
- Best Director
- Best Debut Director
- Best Actor in supporting role
- Best Actress in supporting role
- Best Male Debut
- Best Female Debut
- Best Music Director
- Best Lyricist
- Best playback Singer (male)
- Best Playback Singer (female)

=== Critics Awards ===
- Critics Award Best Film
- Critics Award Best Actor
- Critics Award Best Actress

=== Technical Awards ===
- Best Story
- Best Screenplay
- Best Dialogue
- Best Background Score
- Best Action
- Best Editing
- Best Cinematography
- Best Choreography
- Best Production Design
- Best Sound Design

=== Special awards ===
- Lifetime Achievement Award
- Living Legend Award

== Winners ==
=== Best Actor Female ===
Year	Winner	Work	Ref
2017	Sargun Mehta	Love Punjab	
2018	Sargun Mehta	Lahoriye	
2025	Neeru Bajwa	Shayar	

=== Best Actor Male ===
Year	Winner	Work	Ref
2017	Diljit Dosanjh	Ambarsariya	
2018	Amrinder Gill	Lahoriye	
2025	Amrinder Gill	Mittran Da Challeya Truck Ni	

=== Best Debut Female ===
Year	Winner	Work	Ref
2017	Simi Chahal	Bambukat	
2018	Payal Rajput	Channa Mereya	
2025	Pranjal Dahiya	Rose Rosy Te Gulab	

=== Best Debut Male ===
Year	Winner	Work	Ref
2017	Ravinder	Aatishbazi Ishq	
2018	Ninja	Channa Mereya	
2025	Vishal Brar	Rode College	

== Statistics ==
Most Awards to a single film

- Lahoriye (2018) = 9
- Bambukat (2017) = 8
- Love Punjab (2017) = 7
- Rabb Da Radio (2018) = 5
- Ardaas (2017) = 4
- Channa Mereya (2018) = 4

Best Director

- Ksshitij Chaudhary = 1
- Pankaj Batra = 1

Best Actor

- Ammy Virk = 1
- Diljit Dosanjh = 1

Best Actress

- Sargun Mehta = 2
