= Jatt Punjab Daa =

- Film poster
- Directed by: Yograj Singh
- Produced by: Yograj Singh
- Starring: Yograj Singh; Deep Dhillon
- Release date: 1992
- Country: India
- Language: Punjabi

Jatt Punjab Da is a Punjwood film, which released in 1992.

== Plot ==
Balwant (Yograj Singh) is a young man who has ongoing disputes with one of his neighbors Jang Singh (Deep Dhillon). The court gives a decision in Balwant's favor. Jang Singh is furious. He kills Balwant's father and frames Balwant for it. After 7 years imprisonment, Balwant returns home to find out that Jang Singh has also killed his brother. He takes a revenge by killing each person who was involved in his father's and brother's murder. And at the end, he kills Jang Singh. But he also dies from multiple shots from the police.

== Cast ==
- Yograj Singh as Balwant
- Daljeet Kaur as Balwant's sister-in-law
- Deep Dhillon as Jang Singh
- Neena Sidhu

== Songs ==
- Faqir Mauliwala,
- Dev Tharikewala
- Gill Surjit
