= Jatinder Shah =

Indian music composer

- Origin: Mumbai, India
- Genres: Bollywood, Bhangra, Punjabi, Folk
- Occupations: Composer; musician
- Instruments: Tumbi, Dhol, Tabla
- Labels: Rhythm Boyz, Speed Records, Saga Music

Jatinder Shah is an Indian music composer and record producer. He is primarily recognized for his compositions in Punjabi music and film industry. He has also composed for many Hindi films like Second Hand Husband and Dilliwali Zaalim Girlfriend. His works are notable for integrating pop, and Sufi music with modern music sounds, world music genres and traditional music. In August 2015, he performed live at MTV Coke Studio along with Gurdas Maan and Diljit Dosanjh on the song "Ki Banu Duniya Da" which was widely appreciated allover the world.

== Music Album ==
Year	Name	Singer	Tracks	Label
2008	Virse De Waris	Raj Ranjodh, Jaspinder Narula	9	Saregama
2008	Ni Goriye	Kabir, Preet Khetala	8	Speed Records
2009	Nakhra	Kabir	10	Speed Records
2009	Jattan De Putt Talli	Jai Deep	8	Speed Records
2009	Qaid Bol Gayi (Mulaqat)	Ashok Prince	8	Speed Records
2010	Weapon	Gitta Bains, Bohemia	9	Speed Records
2011	Talwar	Gippy Grewal, Yo Yo Honey Singh	12	Speed Records
2012	Shukraana	Siddharth Mohan	7	Speed Records
2013	Afsaaney Sartaaj De	Satinder Sartaaj	10	Firdaus Production
2013	Roti	Gurdas Mann	8	Speed Records
2014	Replay - The Return Of Melody	Jassi Gill	9	Speed Records
2016	Hazaarey Wala Munda	Satinder Sartaaj	8	Shemaroo Entertainment
2017	Punjab	Gurdas Mann	7	Saga Music
2018	Seasons of Sartaaj	Satinder Sartaaj	7	Saga Music
2018	Roar	Diljit Dosanjh	10	Famous Studios

== Filmography ==
Year	Film	Music composer	Background Score
2026	Carry On Jatta 4	Yes	Yes
2024	Mittran Da Challyea Truck Ni	No	Yes
2024	Shahkot	No	Yes
2024	Vadda Ghar	No	Yes
2023	Carry On Jatta 3	No	Yes
2022	Phatte Dinde Chakk Punjabi	Yes	TBA
2021	Shava Ni Girdhari Lal	Yes	TBA
2021	Paani Ch Madhaani	Yes	TBA
2019	Daaka	Yes	Yes
2019	Nikka Zaildar 3	No	Yes
2019	Ardaas Karaan	Yes	Yes
2019	Laiye Je Yaarian	Yes	No
2019	Chandigarh Amritsar Chandigarh	Yes	Yes
2019	Manje Bistre 2	No	Yes
2019	Kala Shah Kala (Title Song)	Yes	No
2018	Bhajjo Veero Ve	Yes	Yes
2018	Laatu	Yes	Yes
2018	Mar Gaye Oye Loko	No	Yes
2018	Ashke	Yes	No
2018	Vadhayiyaan Ji Vadhayiyaan	Yes	Yes
2018	Nankana	Yes	Yes
2018	Golak Bugni Bank Te Batua	Yes	Yes
2018	Sajjan Singh Rangroot	Yes	No
2017	Firangi	Yes	Yes
2017	Sat Shri Akaal England	Yes	Yes
2017	Bailaras	Yes	No
2017	Vekh Baraatan Challiyan	Yes	No
2017	Thug Life	Yes	No
2017	Super Singh	Yes	No
2017	Lahoriye	Yes	Yes
2017	Sarvann	Yes	Yes
2017	Saab Bahadar	Yes	No
2016	Nikka Zaildar	Yes	Yes
2016	Bambukat	Yes	Yes
2016	Sardaar Ji 2	Yes	No
2016	Ambarsariya	Yes	No
2016	Ardaas	Yes	Yes
2016	Love Punjab	Yes	Yes
2016	Channo Kamli Yaar Di	Yes	No
2015	Dildariyaan	Yes	No
2015	Faraar	Yes	No
2015	Angrej	Yes	Yes
2015	Second Hand Husband	Yes	No
2015	Sardaar Ji	Yes	No
2015	Hero Naam Yaad Rakhi	Yes	No
2015	Dharam Sankat Mein	Yes	No
2015	Oh Yaara Ainvayi Ainvayi Lut Gaya	Yes	No
2014	Punjab 1984	Yes	No
2014	Double Di Trouble	Yes	Yes
2014	Jatt James Bond	Yes	No
2014	Happy Go Lucky	Yes	No
2014	Goreyan Nu Daffa Karo	Yes	Yes
2014	Aa Gaye Munde U.K. De	Yes	No
2014	Romeo Ranjha	Yes	Yes
2014	Dil Vil Pyaar Vyaar	Yes	Yes
2014	Disco Singh	Yes	No
2013	Bhaji in Problem	Yes	Yes
2013	Jatts In Golmaal	Yes	No
2013	Jatt & Juliet 2	Yes	No
2013	Best of Luck	Yes	Yes
2013	Lucky Di Unlucky Story	Yes	Yes
2013	Singh vs Kaur	Yes	Yes
2013	Sadda Haq	Yes	No
2012	Carry On Jatta	Yes	Yes
2012	Jatt and Juliet	Yes	No
2012	Sirphire	Yes	No
2012	Pinky Moge Wali	Yes	No
2012	Mirza: The Untold Story	Yes	Yes
2011	Jihne Mera Dil Luteya	Yes	No
