= Yograj Singh =

Indian cricket player and actor

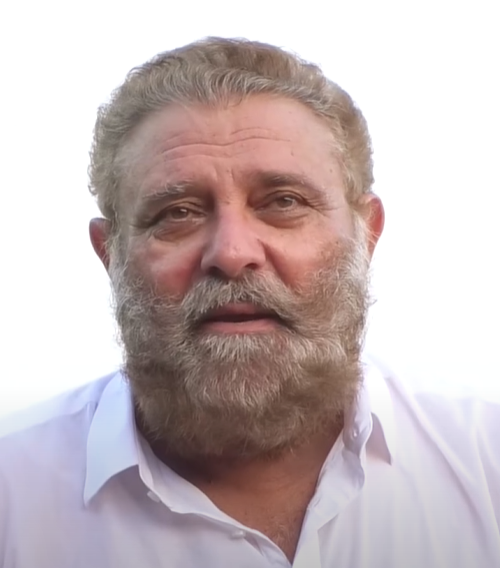

Personal information
- Born: 25 March 1953 (age 73); Kanech Village Ludhiana, Punjab, India
- Batting: Right-handed
- Bowling: Right-arm fast-medium
- Role: Bowler
- Relatives: Yuvraj Singh (son); Hazel Keech (daughter-in-law)

International information
- National side: India (1980–1981)
- Only Test (cap 152): 21 February 1981 v New Zealand
- ODI debut (cap 34): 21 December 1980 v New Zealand
- Last ODI: 15 February 1981 v New Zealand

Career statistics
| Competition | Test | ODI |
|---|---|---|
| Matches | 1 | 6 |
| Runs scored | 10 | 1 |
| Batting average | 5.00 | 0.50 |
| 100s/50s | 0/0 | 0/0 |
| Top score | 5 | 1 |
| Balls bowled | 90 | 244 |
| Wickets | 1 | 4 |
| Bowling average | 63.00 | 46.50 |
| 5 wickets in innings | 0 | 0 |
| 10 wickets in match | 0 | n/a |
| Best bowling | 1/63 | 2/44 |
| Catches/stumpings | 0/– | 0/– |
- Source: ESPNcricinfo, 23 November 2005

Yograj Singh (born 25 March 1953) is an Indian actor and former cricketer who played one Test and six One Day Internationals for India as a right-arm fast-medium bowler. His debut and only Test was at Wellington against New Zealand, which India lost by 62 runs. Yograj only bowled in the first inning and took one wicket, which remains his only Test wicket. After his cricketer career ended due to injury, he entered the Punjabi and Hindi film industries. His son, Yuvraj Singh, was a member of the Indian cricket team from 2000 to 2017. Yograj hails from the village of Kanech, right next to Doraha, in Punjab's Ludhiana District.

He has worked on Bollywood movies like Teen Thay Bhai, Singh is Bling and Bhaag Milkha Bhaag.

== Personal life ==
Singh initially married Shabnam Kaur, but they later got divorced. Their eldest son, Yuvraj Singh, is a former Indian cricketer. Another son of theirs is Zoravar Singh. In 2011, his son, Yuvraj, was diagnosed with cancer and recovered from it. Yograj's cricket training was harsh towards his son Yuvraj, during his childhood. After the couple's divorce, their son, Yuvraj, decided to live with his mother. Later he married Satbir Kaur. He has a son, Victor Singh, and a daughter, Amarjot Kaur, from his second marriage.

== Cricket career ==
In 1977, Yograj Singh was chosen over Kapil Dev for India's U-22 team, that played against England at Nagpur. In 1979, he was picked up for Board President's XI team to play against the touring Pakistan cricket team at Baroda. He took 3 wickets for 29 runs, including the wickets of Javed Miandad and Wasim Raja.

In 1980, he was picked up for the Indian cricket team, touring Australia and New Zealand. On 21 December 1980, he played his first one-day international match against the New Zealand cricket team at Brisbane, claiming 2/44 in 8.4 overs. On 21 February 1981, he played his first Test match against the New Zealand cricket team at Wellington, where he took the wicket of John Wright.

== Film career ==
=== Acting ===
Yograj Singh made his acting debut in the 1983 Punjabi film Batwara., directed by Veerendra Throughout the 1980s and 1990s, he emerged as one of the prominent stars of the Punjabi film industry. He mostly played the main antagonist to Gugu Gill. While he appeared in numerous Punjabi features, he gained nationwide recognition in Bollywood for his performance as the strict athletic coach (Havildar Sampuran Singh) in the 2013 blockbuster biopic Bhaag Milkha Bhag. Other notable Hindi film credits include the 2010 British-Indian production West is West and a role in the 2015 action comedy Singh Is Bliing.

He has remained a mainstay in contemporary Punjabi cinema. Some of his most recognized regional projects include roles in Sajjan Singh Rangroot (2018), and Ardaas Karaan (2019).

=== Direction and screenwriting ===
Beyond acting, Singh has contributed to regional cinema behind the camera. He directed and wrote the screenplay for the 1994 Punjabi film Vichhora. His other directorial and production ventures include Jatt Punjab Da (1992) and Love U Bobby (2009).

== Political career ==
In 2009 Haryana Legislative Assembly election, he contested at the Panchkula constituency on the Indian National Lok Dal ticket. He received 16932 votes, which was 20.51% of the total votes polled. But he lost to Devender Kumar Bansal of Indian National Congress by 12230 votes.

== Controversies ==
Yograj Singh criticised and alleged then Indian cricket team captain MS Dhoni for spoiling his son, Yuvraj Singh's career. According to Singh, due to Dhoni, Yuvraj was dropped from 2015 Cricket World Cup team.

In 2020, Singh accused MS Dhoni for not supporting Yuvraj and "backstabbing" him.

In 2025, Singh also confessed in the podcast Unfiltered by Samdish that Singh aimed a pistol at Kapil Dev and wished to shoot him, but couldn't do so as he was with his mother.

== Filmography ==
- All films are in the Punjabi language unless otherwise noted.

Key
| † | Denotes films that have not yet been released |

| Year | Title | Role | Director | Producer | Writer | Notes |
|---|---|---|---|---|---|---|
| 1983 | Batwara | Jarnail | | | | |
| 1986 | Yaar Gareeba Daa | Ranjeet | | | | |
| 1987 | Jatt Te Zameen | Succhaaa | | | | |
| 1990 | Anakh Jattan Dee | Sheru | | | | |
| 1990 | Qurbani Jatt Di | Jora | | | | |
| 1990 | Dushmani Di Agg | Sheru | | | | |
| 1991 | Jorr Jatt Daa | Jaildar Zora | | | | |
| 1991 | Badla Jatti Da | Jaildaar Jung Singh | | | | |
| 1991 | Subedaar | Kashmeera | | | | |
| 1991 | Jagga Daaku | Jagga | | | | |
| 1992 | Shefali Ki Jawani | Dalla | | | | |
| 1992 | Jatt Punjab Da | Balwant | Yes | Yes | Yes | |
| 1992 | Putt Sardaran De | Jageera | | | | |
| 1992 | Lalkara Jatti Da | Dulla | | | | |
| 1992 | Saali Adhi Ghar Waali | | | | | |
| 1992 | Pagadi Sambhaal Jatta | Rathore Singh | | | | |
| 1992 | Mehndi Shagna Di | Lambardaar | | | | |
| 1992 | Jora Jatt | Jora | | | | |
| 1992 | Jigra Jatt Da | Bakhtaawar 'Bakhtaura' | | | | |
| 1992 | Insaaf Ki Devi | Inspector Ajay Singh | | | | Hindi film |
| 1993 | Kudi Canada Di | | | | | |
| 1993 | Jid Jattan Di | Jabar Singh 'Jabraa' | | | | |
| 1993 | Insaaf Punjab Daa | Jagirdar Shamsher Singh / Dulla | | | | Dual Role |
| 1994 | Vairi | Thanedaar Karam Singh | | | | |
| 1994 | Lalkare Sheran De | Shera | | | | |
| 1994 | Vichhora | Deep | Yes | | Yes | |
| 1994 | Kacheri | Shamsher | | | | |
| 1995 | Jakhmi Jagirdar | Uday Singh / Shera | | | | Dual Role |
| 1995 | Nain Preeto De | | | | | |
| 1995 | Kabzaa | Surjit | | | | Hindi Film |
| 1995 | Zakhmi Sher | | | | | Hindi Film |
| 1996 | Panchayat | Thanedaar Baghel Singh | | | | |
| 1996 | Jatt Sucha Singh Soorma | Succha | | Yes | | |
| 1997 | Wasiyat | | | | | |
| 1997 | Yaar Maar | Jaila | Yes | | Yes | |
| 1999 | Tera Mera Pyar | Mirza | | | | |
| 1999 | Mahaul Theek Hai | Daaku Shera | | | | |
| 2001 | Sikandera | Sheru | | | | |
| 2008 | Babal Da Vehra | Sampuran Singh Sidhu | | | | |
| 2009 | Luv U Bobby | Shamsher Singh | Yes | | | |
| 2010 | West Is West | Customs Official | | | | English Film |
| 2011 | Teen Thay Bhai | Kheterpal Gill | | | | Hindi film |
| 2012 | Yaraan Naal Baharaan 2 | | | | | |
| 2013 | Oye Hoye Pyar Ho Gaya | Shamsher Singh | | | | |
| 2013 | Bhaag Milkha Bhaag | Coach Ranveer Singh | | | | Hindi film |
| 2013 | Young Malang | Maulla Jatt | | | | |
| 2013 | Heer & Hero | | | | | |
| 2014 | Kirpaan: The Sword of Honour | Jora | | | | |
| 2014 | Romeo Ranjha | | | | | |
| 2014 | Baaz | | | | | |
| 2014 | Goreyan Nu Daffa Karo | Naajar Singh | | | | |
| 2015 | Ishq Vich: You Never Know | | | | | |
| 2015 | Singh Is Bliing | Raftaar's Father | | | | Hindi film |
| 2016 | Love Punjab | Sarpanch Pargat's Father | | | | |
| 2016 | 25 Kille | Bachittar Singh | | | | |
| 2016 | Tiger | | | | | |
| 2016 | Teshan | | | | | |
| 2016 | Motor Mitraan Di | Baba | | | | |
| 2017 | The Great Sardaar | Haakam Singh Sarpanch | | | | |
| 2017 | Krazzy Tabbar | Sandhu | | | | |
| 2017 | Channa Mereya | MLA's Father | | | | |
| 2018 | Raja Abroadiya | Succha Singh | | | | |
| 2018 | Sajjan Singh Rangroot | Zorawar Singh | | | | |
| 2018 | Kande | Chandu Pehalwan | | | | |
| 2018 | Jagga Jiunda E | MLA | | | | |
| 2019 | Aish Kar Lai | | | | | |
| 2019 | Dulla Vaily | Buggar Singh | | | | |
| 2019 | Vadda Kalaakar | | | | | |
| 2019 | Ardaas Karaan | | | | | |
| 2019 | Teri Meri Jodi | Haakam Singh | | | | |
| 2019 | Saadi Marji | | | | | |
| 2019 | Doorbeen | | | | | |
| 2020 | Darbar | The head of the gangsters | | | | Tamil film |
| 2021 | Chandigarh Kare Aashiqui | Guruji | | | | Hindi film |
| 2022 | Apne Ghar Bigane | | | | | |
| 2023 | Maujaan Hi Maujaan | | | | | |
| 2024 | Indian 2 | Amit's Bodyguard | | | | Tamil film |
