= Amrinder Gill =

Indian actor and singer

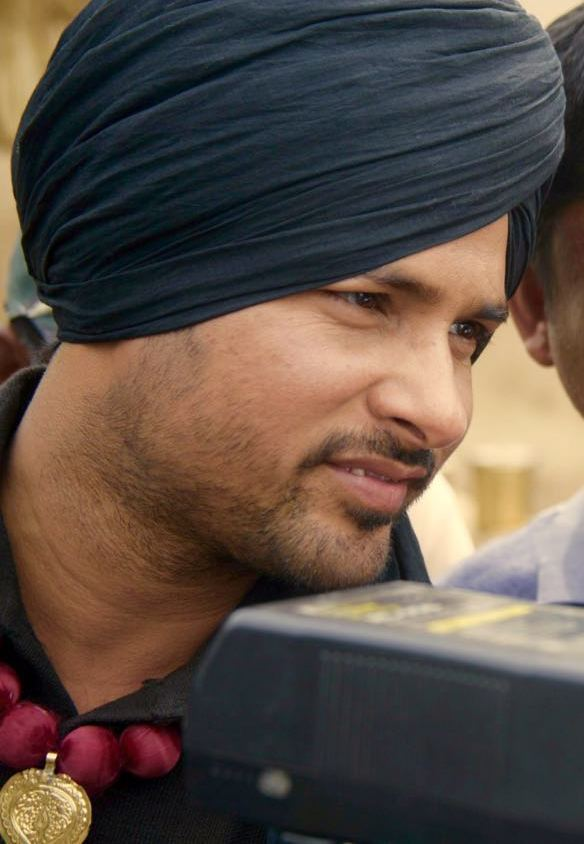
- Gill on the set of the film Angrej
- Born: Amrinder Singh Gill; 11 May 1976 (age 50); Amritsar, Punjab, India
- Education: Guru Nanak Dev University
- Occupations: Actor; singer; producer
- Years active: 1999–present
- Awards: Full list
- Musical career
- Genres: Bhangra; romantic; Pop; Sikh; Folk
- Labels: Speed; Kamlee; T-Series; Planet
- Website: Amrinder Gill on Facebook

Amrinder Singh Gill (Punjabi pronunciation: [əmːˈɾɪndər sɪŋgh ɡɪl]; born 11 May 1976) is an Indian actor, singer, songwriter and film producer who makes Punjabi-language films and music. He has been nominated for twenty-four PTC Punjabi Film Awards, winning seven including three for Best Actor, and two for Best Playback singer and has been nominated for five Filmfare Awards, winning two for Best Actor and Best Playback singer, among other accolades.

Gill recorded his first song for Jalandhar Doordarshan program Kala Doria. He came into the limelight with his track "Paigam", followed by songs like "Daru", "Madhaania", "Khedan De Din", with Sunidhi Chauhan, and many others like "Mel Kara De" and Dildarian. In 2012, Judaa received a Brit Asia Music Award for 'best album'. After the success of Judaa, in mid 2014, Amrinder Gill came up with a sequel Judaa 2, which won Best Album award at PTC Punjabi Music Awards. His last single "Supna" was released in 2015 since then he has released only film tracks. Gill has been credited as playback singer in various films including Chaar Sahibzaade (2014).

Gill has developed other ventures, including Rhythm Boyz Entertainment, with manager Karaj Gill, which helped launch the careers of artists such as Gurshabad. He started his acting career with a supporting role in the film Munde UK De in 2009. Then he acted as lead in films Ik Kudi Punjab Di, Taur Mittran Di, and many more. Finally he had success with films Daddy Cool Munde Fool and Goreyan Nu Daffa Karo. Later, films like Angrej, Love Punjab, Lahoriye, Golak Bugni Bank Te Batua, and Ashke won various awards at different ceremonies. Five of his films, Angrej, Chal Mera Putt, Chal Mera Putt 2, Chal Mera Putt 3, and Chhalla Mud Ke Nahi Aaya, have grossed over ₹30 crore globally, with the second grossing more than ₹50 crore becoming the second highest grossing Punjabi film at the time, before it was surpassed by Saunkan Saunkne the next year.

== Early life and music career ==
Gill was born on 11 May 1976 in Amritsar, Punjab. In an interview, Gill disclosed, "During my childhood days, I would stand in front of the mirror, assuming myself as an actor and would imitate scenes. My father was a doctor, mother was a teacher and my sister was married, therefore often when I was alone at home I would practice to be an actor." He is graduated from Khalsa College, Amritsar. He received master's degree in agriculture science. He is an alumnus of Guru Nanak Dev University.

During college, he performed Bhangra dance as a support artist for personalities like Sarbjit Cheema. Before starting his singing career, he worked in the Ferozepur Central Cooperative Bank as a Manager. He recorded his first song "Sanu Ishq Ho Gaya" in 1999, for Jalandhar Doordarshan program Kala Doria but credited song to Rhythm Boyz instead of himself. Gill has developed other ventures, including Rhythm Boyz Entertainment, with manager Karaj Gill, which helped launch the careers of artists such as Gurshabad, Bir Singh, and Gurpreet Maan.

Gill released his debut studio album "Apni Jaan Ke" in early 2000. The album was produced by Sukhpal Sukh, and was released by Goyal Music. "Ki Kariye" and "Ishq Ho Gaya" were well received by audience. In 2002, Gill released his second studio album "Ek Vaada". Song "Je Mile Oh Kudi" from the album was a commercial success. The album was produced by Gurmeet Singh. Also, Gill referred to the song as one of his favourite songs. The album was followed by the studio album "Chan Da Tukda", released in 2003. This album was produced by Sukhpal Sukh, and was released by Finetouch Music. Gill finally got his breakthrough with the album Dildarian, which was released in 2006; and was produced by Sukhshinder Shinda. Songs "Dildarian" and "Sohni Kuri" from the album were well received. The album was nominated for three categories at 2006 PTC Punjabi Music Awards. In 2008, his fifth studio album "Ishq", produced by Shinda was released. The album was released by Speed Records and Times Music. The album was followed by Dooriyan, which was released in late 2009 by Speed Records and Times Music. The album received numerous nominations at 2010 PTC Punjabi Music Awards.

His album Judaa received a Brit Asia Music Award for 'best album. After the success of Judaa, In mid 2014, Amrinder Gill came up with a sequel Judaa 2. His song "Mera Deewanapan" from the album topped the Asian music chart upon its release. "Pendu" from the album also entered the chart. His last single track "Supna" was released in 2015. Since then he has released songs in films only. His songs like "Kurta Suha" from Angrej, "Heerey" from Love Punjab, "Akhar" from Lahoriye, and "Aisi Taisi" from Golak Bugni Bank Te Batua have been nominated for many awards and won many. In May 2020, Gill announced he has recorded over 25 new songs, and will release his ninth studio album after the lockdown. In May 2021, he announced Judaa 3. The 6-song album Judaa 3 was released in August and one of its songs Chal Jindiye trended on music charts.

== Acting career ==
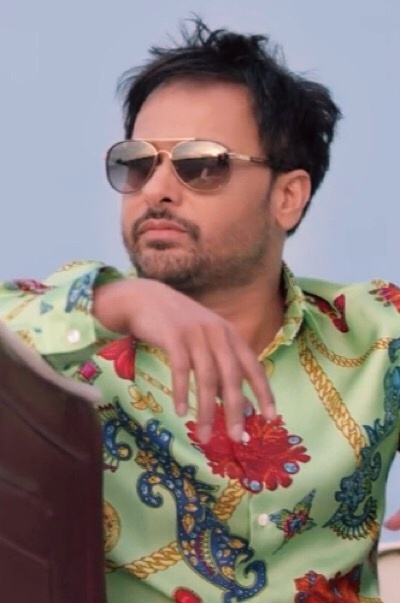
Amrinder Gill in 2019

He made his acting debut under Punjabi director Manmohan Singh's Punjabi film Munde UK De in 2009 in a supporting role with Jimmy Shergill and Neeru Bajwa. He replaced Harbhajan Mann in the film. Before making his debut he took acting classes from Kishore Namit Kapoor Acting Institute in Mumbai. He followed that up with a lead role in Singh's Ik Kudi Punjab Di. His next film Taur Mittran Di for Jimmy Shergill productions released in May 2012, it paired him with actress Surveen Chawla and MTV VJ and Bollywood actor Rannvijay Singh. It opened to a below average response, it had the seventh highest opening day in Punjabi Films. His next movie was Tu Mera 22 Main Tera 22 which pairs him with Punjabi rapper Honey Singh and actress Mandy Takhar.

After that he was seen in Saadi Love Story that co-starred Diljit Dosanjh, Surveen Chawla and Neetu Singh and was directed by Dheeraj Rattan who has written several films for Punjabi cinema. He then worked in Daddy Cool Munde Fool in the same year. In 2015, his film Angrej was released which was produced by Rhythm Boyz Entertainment, a company co-founded by him in 2013. Set against the backdrop of the waning British Raj, the film chronicles the love story of a young man and a woman belonging to different social strata. Critics noted Gill's positive transition from a singer to an actor; Jasmine Singh of The Tribune wrote that while Gill might not "evoke laughter from loud dialogues, but his innocent face and dialogue delivery will leave you in splits". Also, he won his first Best Actor Award at PTC Punjabi Film Awards for his performance. The film grossed ₹30.68 crore (equivalent to ₹46 crore or US$4.8 million in 2023) in its theatrical run and was second highest-grossing Punjabi film of the year and third highest-grossing of all time upon its release.

His releases, Lahoriye (2017) and Love Punjab were also the commercial success which further made him the leading star in Pollywood and garnered praise from both critics and audiences. Gill has been paired with Sargun Mehta in lead three times in Angrej (2015), Love Punjab (2016), and Lahoriye (2017). In 2018, his film Ashke was released which is based on Bhangra for which he won Best Actor (critics) award at PTC Punjabi Film Awards 2019.

His film Love Punjab had clashed with Gippy Grewal directed Ardaas starring Ammy Virk. It was the first clash between two Punjabi movies and both were hits. With this clash it was made clear that Amrinder Gill was the next big star as he defeated not only Gippy Grewal and Ammy Virk but also gave tough competition to Diljit Dosanjh starrer Ambarsariya in overseas and domestic box office, and later surpassed Ambarsariya in its total box office collection. His song "Mathi Mathi" has been able to get millions of views.

In 2019, Gill was seen in Laiye Je Yaarian followed by Chal Mera Putt. The latter became the highest grossing Punjabi film overseas. Its sequel Chal Mera Putt 2 released in 2020. Another sequel, Chal Mera Putt 3, was released in 2021.

Gill made his directorial debut with Chhalla Mud Ke Nahi Aaya in 2022. In 2023, he co-produced Diljit Dosanjh starrer Jodi. Karaj Gill announced Amrinder Gill's two films to be release in 2024.

== Filmography ==
Key
†	Denotes films that have not yet been released

Year	Film	Actor	Producer	Role	Notes
2009	Munde U.K. De	Yes	No	Jagjot Gill	Debut film
2010	Ik Kudi Punjab Di	Yes	No	SP Singh	
2012	Jatt & Juliet	Yes	No	Captain Yuvraaj	Guest appearance
2012	Taur Mittran Di	Yes	No	Himmat	
2013	Tu Mera 22 Main Tera 22	Yes	No	Robby	
2013	Saadi Love Story	Yes	No	Rajveer	
2013	Dady Cool Munde Fool	Yes	No	Manni	
2014	Goreyan Nu Daffa Karo	Yes	No	Kalajeet Singh	
2014	Happy Go Lucky	Yes	No	Harwinder "Happy" Singh	
2015	Angrej	Yes	Yes	Angrej/Geja	
2015	Munde Kamaal De	Yes	No	Vikram	
2016	Love Punjab	Yes	Yes	Parghat Brar	
2016	Bambukat	No	Yes		
2017	Sarvann	Yes	No	Mithu	
2017	Lahoriye	Yes	Yes	Kikkar Singh	
2017	Vekh Baraatan Challiyan	Yes	Yes	Subeh	Cameo appearance
2017	Bhalwan Singh	No	Yes		
2018	Golak Bugni Bank Te Batua	Yes	Yes	Bhola	Cameo
2018	Ashke	Yes	Yes	Pamma	
2018	Bhajjo Veero Ve	No	Yes		
2019	Laiye Je Yaarian	Yes	Yes	Garry Randhawa	
2019	Chal Mera Putt	Yes	Yes	Jinder	
2020	Chal Mera Putt 2	Yes	Yes	Jinder	
2021	Chal Mera Putt 3	Yes	Yes	Jinder	
2022	Chhalla Mud Ke Nahi Aaya	Yes	Yes	Chhalla	Debut as director
2023	Annhi Dea Mazaak Ae	No	Yes		
2023	Jodi	No	Yes		
2023	Maurh	No	Yes		
2024	Daru Na Peenda Hove	Yes	Yes	Jagroop	
2024	Mittran Da Challeya Truck Ni	Yes	No	Satta	
2025	Chal Mera Putt 4	Yes	Yes	Jinder	
2026	Golak Bugni Bank Te Batua 2†	Yes	Yes	TBA	Post Production

== Discography ==
Title	Album details	Peak chart positions	Notes
Title	Album details	CAN	Notes
Apni Jaan Ke	Released: 1 January 2000; Label: Goyal Music; Format: CD, digital download, streaming	—	Music : Sukhpal Sukh
Chan Da Tukda	Released: 30 November 2001; Label: Finetouch; Format: CD, digital download, streaming	—	Music : Sukhpal Sukh
Ek Vaada	Released: 1 March 2002; Label: Finetouch; Format: CD, digital download, streaming	—	Music: Gurmeet Singh
Dildarian	Released: 31 March 2005; Label: Music Waves; Format: CD, digital download, streaming	—	Music : Sukshinder Shinda
Ishq	Released: 6 September 2007; Label: Kamlee Records, Planet Recordz, Speed Records; Format: CD, digital download, streaming	—	Music : Sukshinder Shinda
Dooriyan	Released: 20 November 2009; Label: Planet Recordz, Speed Records; Format: CD, digital download, streaming	—	Music : Sukshinder Shinda
Judaa	Released: 19 November 2011; Label: Music Waves, Speed Records; Format: CD, digital download, streaming	—	Music : Dr Zeus; Brit Asia Award for Best Album; PTC Award for Best Romantic Ballad
Judaa 2	Released: 24 January 2014; Label: Speed Records, Times Music, Rhythm Boyz; Format: CD, digital download, streaming	—	Music : Dr Zeus; PTC Award for Best Album
Judaa 3 Chapter 1	Released: 1 September 2021; Label: Rhythm Boyz; Format: CD, digital download, streaming	61	Music : Dr Zeus
Judaa 3 Chapter 2	Released: 24 May 2024; Label: Rhythm Boyz; Format: CD, digital download, streaming	—	Music : Dr Zeus
HAZIR	Released: 21 September 2026; Label: Rhythm Boyz; Format: CD, digital download, streaming		Music : Armaan Gill & Arnaaz Gill

== See also ==
- Karaj Gill
