= Angrej =

2015 Indian film by Simerjit Singh

- Theatrical release poster
- Directed by: Simerjit Singh
- Written by: Amberdeep Singh
- Produced by: Jaspal Singh Sandhu; Amarbir Sandhu; Aman Khatkar; Sameer Dutts
- Starring: Amrinder Gill; Aditi Sharma; Sargun Mehta; Ammy Virk; Binnu Dhillon
- Cinematography: Navneet Misser
- Edited by: Omkarnath Bhakri
- Music by: Jatinder Shah
- Production companies: Rhythm Boyz Entertainment; Dara Productions; J Studio
- Release date: 31 July 2015
- Running time: 136 minutes
- Country: India
- Language: Punjabi
- Box office: ₹30.68 crore

Angrej (transl. Englishman) is a 2015 Indian Punjabi-language historical romance film directed by Simerjit Singh. Set against the backdrop of the waning British Raj, the film chronicles the love story of a young man and a woman, played by Amrinder Gill and Sargun Mehta respectively, belonging to different social strata. Angrej has Aditi Sharma, Ammy Virk, Binnu Dhillon, Anita Devgan, Sardar Sohi, and Nirmal Rishi in supporting roles; it marked the feature film debut for Mehta and Virk.

Conceived as a romantic comedy set in the pre-partitioned Punjab, Angrej's story was written by Amberdeep Singh, who had always wanted to work on a period film about Punjabi culture. The film was shot in the rural parts of Rajasthan and Punjab over 40 days, with Navneet Misser serving as the cinematographer. Jatinder Shah composed the film's soundtrack, which features vocals from Gill, Virk and Sunidhi Chauhan.

Angrej was released theatrically on 31 July 2015; it received a positive response from film critics and audience alike. The performances of the cast, the production design, and the humour were chiefly praised. Commercially, Angrej grossed a total of around ₹307 million in its theatrical run and became one of the highest-grossing Punjabi films of all time. It was nominated for 22 awards at the 2015 PTC Punjabi Film Awards, winning ten including the Best Film, Best Director (Simerjeet Singh), Best Actor (Gill), and Best Actress (Mehta).

== Plot ==
Angrej, an older adult from India, arrives at his pre-partition home in Pakistan, where he meets the current residents. When asked about his time in Pakistan, he tells them of his life in the pre-partitioned India.

In 1945, a young farmer Angrej and his friend Aslam, visit a mela (carnival)in a nearby village. Angrej meets Maado at the mela (who he is in love with). She reciprocates his feelings. He proposes marriage to Maado, but she is reluctant as her family would not approve of a love marriage, neither would Angrej's. He tells his mother of his intentions to marry Maado. Angrej's mother disapproves of love in general, but his sister-in-law agrees to arrange for the marriage.

Later, when Angrej goes to inform Maado of the impending marriage proposal, Maado's father catches him. Before her father could do anything, a snake bites him, and he loses his ability to speak as a result of partial paralysis. Haakam, a rich landlord from Lahore and a distant relative of Maado's grandmother, begins to visit Maado's house and flirts with Maado frequently. Angrej sells his buffalo in order to buy gold bangle for Maado. However, she tells him that her family disapproves of his financial condition. She gives in to the advances made by Haakam, who brings her various gifts. Angrej is heartbroken when he witnesses a secret meeting between the two; Hakkam had brought a wood-cased radio for Maado from Lahore, much to her amusement.

Angrej's family is invited to his cousin's wedding, where he meets Dhann Kaur, his cousin's friend and the daughter of a wealthy aristocrat. The two develop a friendship over the course of the next few days. Maado and her family are also present at the wedding. Kaur helps Angrej in getting back with Maado, but is herself attracted to him. Haakam arrives at the wedding with the groom's baraat; that night, he makes a pass at many women, including Kaur. Angrej rebukes him, and the two engage in a fight but are later pacified by Maado's father. Hakkam continues to flirt with women and is caught by Maado the following day when Angrej makes her aware of it. Angrej consoles her, and the two rekindle their romance. The wedding concludes on the day of the vidai, and the guests begin to return home — angrej bids farewell to Kaur, who is smitten by him by this point.

Angrej begins to dress like a landlord and visits Maado. Impressed by his new appearance, Maado proposes him for marriage. Angrej realises that he does not love Maado any more but instead wants to be with Kaur, who loves him. He gifts the bangle to Maado and takes his leave. He reaches Dhann Kaur's village only to find out that she got engaged. He leaves heartbroken.

A few days later Aslam informs him that Dhann Kaur's fiancé is Haakam. Angrej then pleads his case to Kaur's father, who is enraged by his indecency and impudence. He threatens to shoot an undeterred Angrej as Kaur watches helplessly. Maado's father, who has recovered from his paralysis, intervenes and vouches for Angrej. He is able to convince Kaur's father to agree to the wedding, much to the delight of the couple.

In the present day, Angrej scatters Kaur's ashes in the open fields around their old home as per her last wishes.

== Cast ==
- Amrinder Gill as Angrej 'Geja'
- Sargun Mehta as Dhann Kaur
- Aditi Sharma as Maado
- Ammy Virk as Haakam
- Binnu Dhillon as Aslam
- Sardar Sohi as Baghel Singh, Maado's grandfather
- Nirmal Rishi as Maado's grandmother
- Anita Devgan as Geja's Mother
- Nisha Bano as Maado's friend
- Hobby Dhaliwal as Gajjan Singh
- Gurmeet Saajan as Angrej's fuffad

== Production ==
=== Development ===
Amrinder Gill and Amberdeep Singh began working on Angrej immediately after the completion of their previous production, the 2014 comedy film Goreyan Nu Daffa Karo. Singh wrote the screenplay and dialogue for the film; he said that idea of an Indian wedding in the pre-partitioned Punjab is what inspired him to write the script. He wanted the film to represent "the culture, the food, the joy" for the contemporary audience. Gill, who also starred in the film described it as a love story set in rural Punjab of 1945, one that "silently introduces the traditional Punjabi culture and lifestyle" and is "packed with high doses of comedy". Simerjit Singh was later hired to direct the film. In an interview with the Punjab News Express, he said that the film's title, Angrej, which roughly translates to "Englishman" was used by the people of British Punjab to label someone whose "thoughts were ahead of their times".

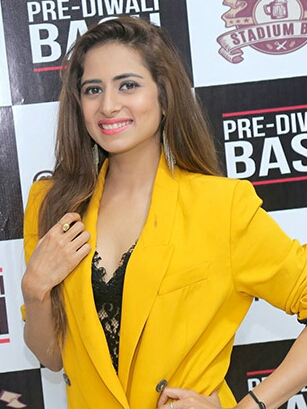
Sargun Mehta (pictured 2017) made her feature film debut with Angrej.

Gill said that it was a challenging task to find the right actresses to play Maado and Dhan Kaur. Aditi Sharma and debutante Sargun Mehta, who according to Gill suited the characters "unbelievably well", were eventually cast in the roles after a lengthy auditioning process and multiple screen tests. Sharma said that she always wanted to work in a Punjabi film and was attracted to Angrej's script and its "old world charm". Mehta, who made her feature film debut was offered the role by Amberdeep Singh. The duo had previously worked together on the reality show Comedy Circus. Comedian Binnu Dhillon, Punjabi singer Ammy Virk, Anita Devgan, Sardar Sohi, and Nirmal Rishi play supporting roles in the films. Virk said that he was keen on doing the film as the role of Hakkam resembled him in real life. To prepare for their respective roles, the cast met various people who had been residents of Punjab in the 1940s; Gill also read books and watched documentaries about Punjabi culture and the use of language.

=== Filming and post-production ===
Principal photography for Angrej took place in rural Punjab and Rajasthan; Navneet Misser served as the film's cinematographer. The scenes of the village locale were shot at Suratgarh, a remote town close to the border of the two states as the production team wanted to "depict life sans electric poles, mobile towers and modern-day lifestyle". Production designer Raashid Rangrez said that the producers chose Rajasthan over Punjab as the semi-arid terrain of the region was better representative of Punjab prior to the green revolution; he added that for an "authentic 1945 setup, we had to be connected with earthy look". He paid particular attention to landscaping, with the production team constructing their own sets on the various shooting locations. The cast and crew had also collected such property as period utensils prior to commencement of filming.

Costumes, which included Punjabi wedding attire, were made of khadi handloom fabric. The cloth was brought from Banaras, Bikaner, and Jalandhar. Rangrez and his team of designers, which included Manmeet Bindra, used white cloth for creating the costumes and dyed them later: "emotions matter more and emotions are connected deeply with colors. So [we] wanted to create colors on our own". Filming for the production was done in a single schedule that lasted for around 40 days. Angrej was edited by Omkarnath Bhakri and its final cut ran for a total of 136 minutes. The film was produced by Aman Khatkar Productions and Arsara Films in collaboration with Dara Productions, J Studios, and Rhythm Boyz Entertainment. The international distribution rights for the project were acquired by the London-based production and distribution house, Filmonix.

== Soundtrack ==
Angrej

Soundtrack album by Jatinder Shah
- Released: 23 July 2015
- Recorded: 2015
- Genre: Feature film soundtrack
- Length: 23:00
- Label: Rhythm Boyz

Angrej's soundtrack was composed by Punjabi music composer and recording artist Jatinder Shah; the lyrics were written by Happy Raikoti, Vinder Nathumajra, Jaggi Jagowal, and Shveta Saarya. The album consists of seven songs which were primarily recorded by Gill, except for the tracks "Jind Mahi", which was sung by Sunidhi Chauhan and "Angrej Tappe", which featured additional verses from Virk. The complete soundtrack was released under the label of Rhythm Boyz on iTunes on 23 July 2015. The album was also made available for digital download on Google Play in the same month; it was well received by audience and holds an average score of 4.7 out of 5 on Google Play based on 53 reviews. Critical response to the music was positive; at the 2015 PTC Punjabi Film Awards, Shah and Raikoti won the Best Music Director and Best Lyricist awards respectively. Jasmine Singh of The Tribune dubbed the songs as "brilliant" and singled out the "peppy, traditional, and hummable" number "Kurta Suha" as the highlight of the album. The track was also nominated for the Song of the Year award at PTC ceremony. Also, the song peaked on the UK Asian Music Chart by Official Charts Company.

Track list
No.	Title	Lyrics	Music	Singer(s)	Length
1.	"Mil Ke Baithange"	Vinder Nathumajra	Jatinder Shah	Amrinder Gill	3:38
2.	"Kurta Suha"	Happy Raikoti	Jatinder Shah	Amrinder Gill	3:13
3.	"Family Di Member"	Jaggi Jagowal	Jatinder Shah	Amrinder Gill	2:35
4.	"Chete Kar Kar Ke"	Happy Raikoti	Jatinder Shah	Amrinder Gill	4:04
5.	"Vanjhali Vaja"	Happy Raikoti	Jatinder Shah	Amrinder Gill	4:14
6.	"Jind Mahi"	Shveta Saarya	Jatinder Shah	Sunidhi Chauhan	2:15
7.	"Angrej Tappe"	Happy Raikoti	Jatinder Shah	Amrinder Gill, Ammy Virk	3:41
Total length:					23:00

== Release ==
=== Box office ===
Angrej was released theatrically on 31 July 2015. It collected an approximate total of ₹11.5 million (US$120,000) on its opening day, making it the third highest opening day collection for a Punjabi film in the region and fourth highest in India. The production was expected to do well in Punjab when compared to other releases including the mystery thriller Drishyam. The numbers grew over the next two days and the film went on to collect around ₹40.5 million (US$430,000) in its opening weekend. Angrej also released internationally in the United Kingdom, Australia, and New Zealand collecting a total of ₹125 million (US$1.3 million) overall. The film grossed a total of ₹307 million (US$3.3 million) in its theatrical run, making it one of the highest grossing Punjabi films of all time.

=== Critical response ===
[Angrej] is a cheerful reminder of love in the old times when a boy would fear asking out the girl he loved, forget about holding hands [...] what catches your attention is the detailing done to the tee. The sets, the props, the dresses and dialect, everything reminds you of the old times, which probably you have heard or seen. And without any exaggeration!

— Jasmine Singh, The Tribune

Jasmine Singh of The Tribune praised most aspects of the production. She described it as a period love story "sewn together with precision [...] Ruh ton! (right from the soul)". She wrote that the film establishes a rapport with the audience and there is not a single drab moment. Singh also positively reviewed the film's dialogue, narrative, and direction, adding that Amberdeep Singh "ensures you laugh [and] cry like a child and fall in love like you have just turned a child!". Others also ascribed the film's appeal to its flawless screenplay and "beautifully worded" dialogue and credited Amberdeep for creating a "masterpiece".

Angrej was also praised for its production design and described as "one of the rare Punjabi films, in which the art department had worked really hard on recreating an era in which this film is set [...] by taking care of minute details". Reacting positively to the Misser's camera work, Amritbir Kaur wrote that the exotic locale and sceneries have been used so charmingly that "they are in such close proximity of the main fabric of the film". Commentators were also appreciative of the film's use of humour, which finds a "meaningful place" in the film's narrative and "[is] so natural and spontaneous that nowhere one is forced to laugh".

The performances of the majority cast were also well received. Critics noted Gill's positive transition from a singer to an actor; Singh wrote that while Gill might not "evoke laughter from loud dialogues, but his innocent face and dialogue delivery will leave you in splits". Observers were also unanimous in their praise for Dhillion's natural acting skills and his comic abilities. Both Kaur and Singh lauded Mehta and Sharma for their performances in their debut roles, Kaur favoured Mehta for her spontaneity. Singh also noted that Angrej went beyond the generic hero-centric premise: "every single character fits the bill". She was particularly impressed by Devgan's "loveable and absolutely fantastic" and Sohi's "brilliant" performances.

== Awards and nominations ==
Award	Date of ceremony (Note: Date is linked to the article about the awards held that year, wherever possible.)	Category	Recipient and nominee	Result	Ref(s)
PTC Punjabi Film Awards	14 April 2016	Best Editing	Omkarnath Bhakri	Nominated	
PTC Punjabi Film Awards	14 April 2016	Best Story	Amberdeep Singh	Won	
PTC Punjabi Film Awards	14 April 2016	Best Cinematography	Navneet Misser	Nominated	
PTC Punjabi Film Awards	14 April 2016	Best Screenplay	Amberdeep Singh	Won	
PTC Punjabi Film Awards	14 April 2016	Best Dialogues	Amberdeep Singh	Nominated	
PTC Punjabi Film Awards	14 April 2016	Best Lyricist	Happy Raikoti (for song "Kurta Suha")	Won	
PTC Punjabi Film Awards	14 April 2016	Best Lyricist	Vinder Nathumajra (for song "Mil Ke Baithange")	Nominated	
PTC Punjabi Film Awards	14 April 2016	Best Music Director	Jatinder Shah	Won	
PTC Punjabi Film Awards	14 April 2016	Best Playback Singer (female)	Sunidhi Chauhan (for song "Jind Mahi")	Nominated	
PTC Punjabi Film Awards	14 April 2016	Best Playback Singer (male)	Amrinder Gill (for song "Kurta Suha")	Nominated	
PTC Punjabi Film Awards	14 April 2016	Best Playback Singer (male)	Amrinder Gill (for song "Vanjhali Vaja")	Nominated	
PTC Punjabi Film Awards	14 April 2016	Most Popular Song of the Year	Amrinder Gill (for song "Kurta Suha")	Nominated	
PTC Punjabi Film Awards	14 April 2016	Most Popular Song of the Year	Amrinder Gill (for song "Vanjhali Vaja")	Nominated	
PTC Punjabi Film Awards	14 April 2016	Best Debut (female)	Aditi Sharma	Won	
PTC Punjabi Film Awards	14 April 2016	Best Debut (female)	Sargun Mehta	Nominated	
PTC Punjabi Film Awards	14 April 2016	Best Debut (male)	Ammy Virk	Won	
PTC Punjabi Film Awards	14 April 2016	Best Supporting Actor	Ammy Virk	Nominated	
PTC Punjabi Film Awards	14 April 2016	Best Actress	Aditi Sharma	Nominated	
PTC Punjabi Film Awards	14 April 2016	Best Actress	Sargun Mehta	Won	
PTC Punjabi Film Awards	14 April 2016	Best Actor	Amrinder Gill	Won	
PTC Punjabi Film Awards	14 April 2016	Best Director	Simerjit Singh	Won	
PTC Punjabi Film Awards	14 April 2016	Best Film	Angrej	Won	
