= Nirmal Rishi =

Indian actress

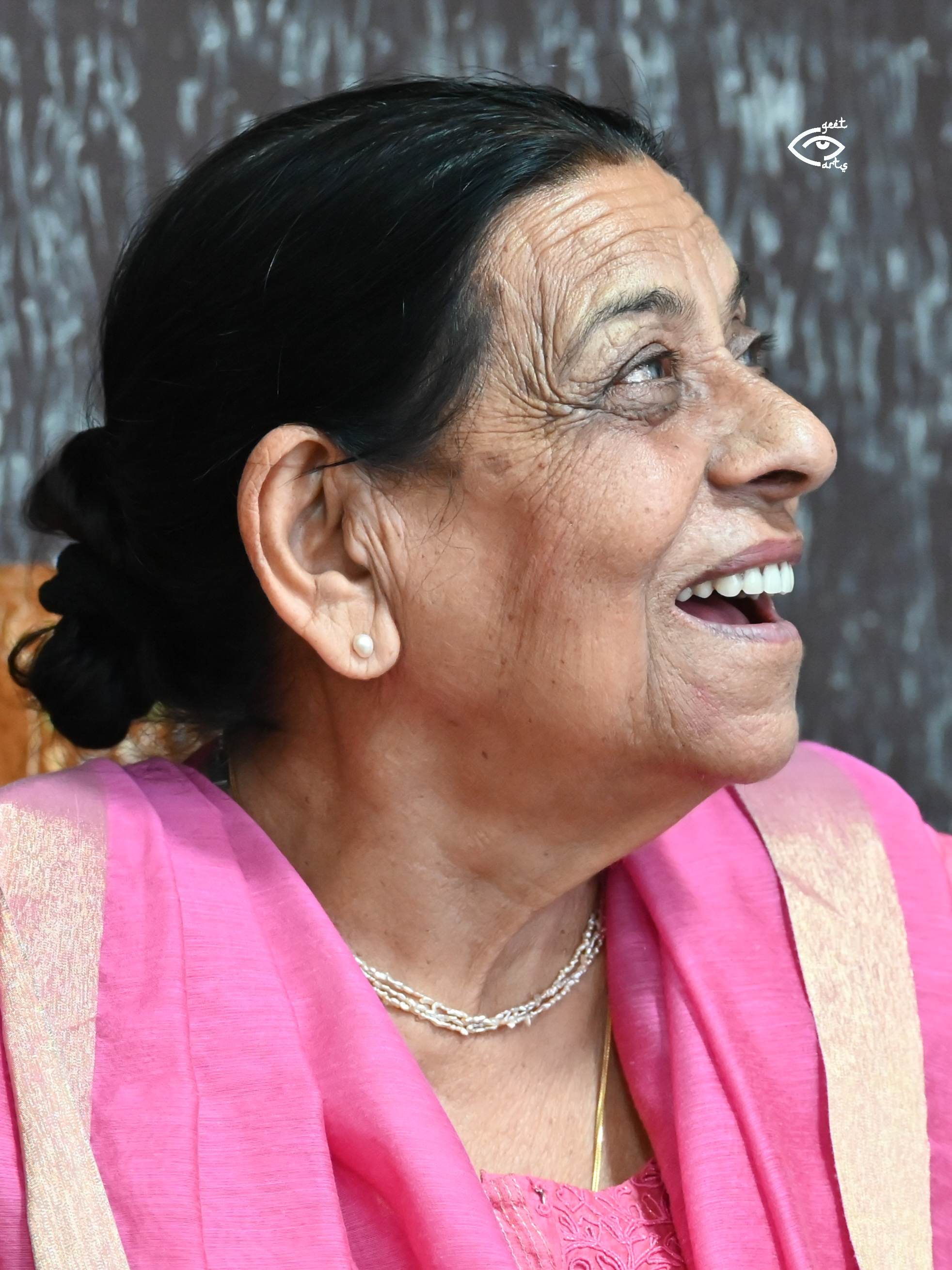
- Born: 28 August 1943 (age 82); Khiva Kalan Bathinda (now Mansa), Punjab, British India
- Occupations: Actress, Teacher
- Years active: 1970s-present
- Honours: Padma Shri (2024)

Nirmal Rishi (born 1943) is an Indian Punjabi film and television actress. She is most remembered for her role as Gulabo Maasi in her first movie Long Da Lishkara (1983). She is best known for appearing in Punjabi movies like Nikka Zaildar, Nikka Zaildar 2 and The Great Sardar. In 2024, she was awarded the prestigious Padma Shri award by the Government of India.

== Early life and film career ==
Rishi was born in 1943 in the village Khiva Kalan of Mansa district. Her father was Sarpanch Baldev Krishan Rishi and mother name was Bachni Devi. She was very passionate about theatre right from her school days. She chose to be a physical education instructor and joined Government College Patiala for Physical Education. During her studies at Govt College for Physical education she came into contact with Harpal & Nina Tiwana and joined their theatre group Punjab Kala Manch, she was one of there first students and her compatriot during her time then was Late Shri Om Puri. She has been associated with the Tiwana family since then and has been a part of all the plays. She is the founder trustee of the Harpal Tiwana Foundation.

She acted in more than 60 films, including Long Da Lishkara (1983) Ucha Dar Babe Nanak Da (1985), Diva Bale Sari Raat, Suneha, Love Punjab (2015), Death on Wheels, Woman from the East, Nikka Zaildar (2016), Angrej (2015), Lahoriye (2017), and Nikka Zaildar 2 (2017) and a cameo appearance in Hindi-language film Dangal (2016).

== Filmography ==
Year	Film	Role	Notes
1983	Long Da Lishkara	Gulabo Massi	
1985	Ucha Dar Babe Nanak Da	Bhaago (Shamsher's sister)	
1990	Sheran De Putt Sher	Bachni	
1990	Qurbani Jatt Di	Bhua	
1991	Jigra Jatt Da	Bishan Kaur- Bakhtaawar's mother	
1991	Diva Bale Sari Raat	Jindo	
1993	Ankhila Soorma	Tejo	
1995	Khel Taqdeeran De	Kauri	
1997	Mela	Parsinn Kaur	
2007	Billian ch Baander	Mrs Saroj Bakshi	
2008	Sat Sri Akal		
2009	Akhiyaan Udeekdian	Dilsher's Mother	
2010	Panjaban -Love Rules Hearts	Karan's Mother	
2013	Woman from the East	Jeeto Singh	
2013	Saadi Love Story		
2014	Dilli 1984	Vamp	
2014	Little Terrors	Grandmother	Hindi/English/Urdu Film
2014	Oh My Pyo!	Binnu's Mother	
2015	Angrej	Marho's grandmother	
2016	Lakeeran		
2016	Darra	Mother of Darra, Pammi, and Kartar	
2016	Love Punjab	Pargat's Mother	
2016	Nikka Zaildar	Daleep Kaur- Nikka's grandmother	
2016	Bambukat	Resham's mother	
2016	Dangal	Cameo Appearance	Hindi Film
2017	Lahoriye	Tej Parkash Kaur- Kikkar's mother	
2017	Rabb Da Radio	Bebe Hardev Kaur	
2017	Arjan	Amro	
2017	Asli Punjab		
2017	The Great Sardaar	Sarpanch's Mother	
2017	KRAZZY TABBAR	Swarn Kaur	
2017	Nikka Zaildar 2	Deso Kaur- Nikka's Bebe	
2017	Bailaras		
2017	Ek Anokhi Dulhan	Saavi	
2017	Hard Kaur	Satwant Kaur	
2018	Subedaar Joginder Singh	Bibi Krishan Kaur	
2018	Laung Laachi	Ajaypal's daadi	
2018	Daana Paani	Basant Kaur (old age)	
2018	Carry On Jatta 2	Lady at Marriage Beaureu	
2018	Kurmaiyan	Ambo Jai Kaur	
2018	Parahuna	Bhua	
2018	Aate Di Chidi		
2018	Afsar		
2018	Marriage Palace		
2018	Rajma Chawal	Beeji/Bebe	Hindi Film
2018	Bhajj Rohan Ve		
2019	Arjun Patiala	Arjun's Mother	Hindi Film
2019	Aakhiri Waris		
2019	Vadda Kalakaar		
2019	Kaake Da Viyah	Bebe	
2019	Kala Shah Kala	Nindro Bhua	
2019	Guddiyan Patole	Naani Jal Kaur	
2020	Who's Your Daddy??	Biji	Hindi Web Series
2021	Paani Ch Madhaani		
2022	Saunkan Saunkne	Nirmal Singh's mother	
2022	Bajre Da Sitta	roop's grandmother	
2022	Ni Main Sass Kuttni		
2022	Sher Bagga	Shera's Grandmother	
2022	Shakkar Paare		
2022	Maa Da Ladla		
2022	Honeymoon		
2023	Mitran Da Naa Chalda		
2023	Godday Godday Chaa		
2024	Shinda Shinda No Papa		
2024	Ni Main Sass Kutni 2	Dada Sass	
