= Chhalla Mud Ke Nahi Aaya =

- Official release poster
- Directed by: Amrinder Gill
- Written by: Amberdeep Singh
- Produced by: Amrinder Gill
- Starring: Amrinder Gill; Sydney Eberwein; Karamjit Anmol; Sargun Mehta; Binnu Dhillon; Amrit Waraich
- Cinematography: Dan Dumouchel
- Edited by: Aalaap Majgavkar; Tejbir Kambo
- Music by: Lowkey
- Production companies: Rhythm Boyz Entertainment; Amberdeep Films
- Distributed by: Rhythm Boyz; Omjee Star Studios
- Release date: 29 July 2022
- Running time: 140 minutes
- Country: India
- Language: Punjabi
- Budget: $1.5 million

Chhalla Mud Ke Nahi Aaya is a 2022 Indian Punjabi-language historical drama film directed and produced by Amrinder Gill, written by Amberdeep Singh, and co-produced by Rhythm Boyz Entertainment and Amberdeep Films. It stars Amrinder Gill, Binnu Dhillon, Sargun Mehta, Karamjit Anmol and Amrit Waraich. The film is based on the hardships faced by Chhalla from pre-partitioned Punjab who goes to Canada in search of work and financial stability. It marked the feature film directorial debut for Amrinder Gill.

The film was released theatrically at cinemas on 29 July 2022, and generally received positive reviews from critics.

== Synopsis ==
The film is based in Pre-Partition Punjab. The story revolves around Chhalla who goes to Canada to find financial stability. He along with his friend Gama face many hurdles to earn and send money back to their families, as they struggle to earn equal pay as white labourers and face discrimination.

== Cast ==
- Amrinder Gill as Chhalla
- Sydney Eberwein as Bella
- Karamjit Anmol as Najjar
- Sargun Mehta as Jeeto (cameo appearance)
- Binnu Dhillon as Gamma (cameo appearance)
- Amrit Waraich as Tara Singh
- Raj Kakra as Fauji
- Harpreet Bains as Sukho
- Gary Dehlon as Hazaara
- Bikram Brar as Munshi

== Release ==
The trailer for the film was released on 23 July and the film was released on 29 July 2022 .

== Music ==
Music for the film is provided by Lowkey and Rhythm Boyz Entertainment.

=== Track list ===
No.	Title	Lyrics	Music	Singer(s)	Length
1.	"Chhalla Mud Ke Nahi Aaya"	Bir Singh	Lowkey	Amrinder Gill	3:38
2.	"Dubda Sooraj"	Bir Singh	Lowkey	Amrinder Gill	3:19
3.	"Baagh"	Bir Singh	Lowkey	Amrinder Gill	2:36
4.	"Doongiyan Baatan"	Hardeep Singh	Lowkey	Amrinder Gill	3:23
5.	"Mulk"	Raj Kakra	Lowkey	Amrinder Gill	2:08

== Reception ==
=== Box office ===
Challa Mud Ke Nahi Aaya opened at (#7) with A$505,449 in Australia and at (#6) with NZ$94,635 in New Zealand. In North America, the film grossed est. $665,000 in the opening weekend, with high figures in Toronto, Winnipeg and Vancouver. In United Kingdom, it grossed £48,464 in the opening weekend.

=== Critical reception ===
Shital of The Tribune gave three stars out of five and said, "Humour, emotion, great storyline and definitely a worthy climax, Chhalla Mud Ke Nahi Aaya scores on every front."
