= Judaa 3 Chapter 1 =

Studio album by Amrinder Gill
- Released: 1 September 2021
- Genres: Pop, Romantic, Ballad
- Length: 37:13
- Label: Rhythm Boyz
- Producers: Dr Zeus; Karaj Gill (exec.)

Amrinder Gill chronology
Judaa 2 (2014)	Judaa 3 Chapter 1 (2021)	Judaa 3 Chapter 2 (2024)

Singles from Judaa 3 Chapter 1
- 1. "Chal Jindiye" Released: 31 August 2021

Judaa 3 Chapter 1 is a 2021 studio album by Amrinder Gill. The album was produced by Dr Zeus, whereas lyrics were penned by Raj Ranjodh, Jaggi Jagowal, Harmanjeet, Bir Singh, Umar Malik, and Navi Ferozpuria. The album is sequel to a 2014 album Judaa 2 by Gill and Zeus. The album was released on digital media on 1 September 2021. The album debuted at number 61 on Canadian Albums Chart by Billboard.

== Track listing ==
No.	Title	Lyrics	Music	Length
1.	"Band Darwaze"	Raj Ranjodh	Dr Zeus	5:08
2.	"Chal Jindiye"	Bir Singh	Dr Zeus	3:24
3.	"Pagg" (featuring Nseeb)	Jaggi Jagowal	Dr Zeus	2:58
4.	"Zid Kaisi"	Umar Malik	Dr Zeus	4:04
5.	"Necklace"	Jaggi Jagowal	Dr Zeus	3:29
6.	"Gussa"	Navi Ferozpuria	Dr Zeus	3:26
7.	"Muqabla"	Harmanjeet	Dr Zeus	2:53
8.	"Band Darwaze" (Ballad Mix)		Dr Zeus
9.	"Judaa 3 (title track)"	Raj Ranjodh	Dr Zeus	3:48
10.	"That Girl"	Raj Ranjodh	Dr Zeus	2:25
11.	"Havaa"	Harmanjeet	Dr Zeus	3:27
12.	"Kafka"	Raj Ranjodh	Dr Zeus	3:21
13.	"Reflection"	Bir Singh	Dr Zeus	2:42
14.	"Sunkissed"	Kaptaan	Dr Zeus	3:00
15.	"Kamli Jehi"	Vicky Gill	Dr Zeus	3:24
16.	"Goriye"	Rav Hanjra	Dr Zeus	3:01
Total length:				37:13

== Reception ==
Three songs from the album debuted on UK Asian chart by Official Charts Company. "Chal Jindiye" debuted at no. 20, "Band Darwaze" at no. 26, and "Pagg" at no. 36. As of 4 November 2022, the music video of "Chal Jindiye" has been viewed over 50 million times on YouTube, and the video for "Band Darwaze" has been viewed over 10 million times.

== Charts ==
Chart (2021)	Peak position
Canadian Albums (Billboard)	61
Asian Music Chart Top 40 (Official Charts Company)	20
