= Judaa 2 =

Studio album by Amrinder Gill
- Released: 24 January 2014
- Genre: Pop
- Length: 36:52
- Label: Rhythm Boyz
- Producer: Dr Zeus; Karaj Gill (exec.)

Amrinder Gill chronology
Judaa (2011)	Judaa 2 (2014)	Judaa 3 Chapter 1 (2021)

Judaa 2 is a 2014 studio album by Amrinder Gill. The album was composed by Dr Zeus and Bilal Saeed whereas lyrics were penned by Bilal Saeed, Jeet Salala, Bittu Cheema, Happy Raikoti, Alfaaz, Himat Jeet Singh and Charan Likhari. The album is sequel to a 2011 album Judaa by Gill and Zeus. The album was released on digital media on 24 January 2014.

== Background ==
Amrinder Gill started selecting songs for the album in March 2013.

== Track listing ==
No.	Title	Lyrics	Music	Length
1.	"Mera Deewanapan"	Jit Salala	Dr Zeus	4:02
2.	"Salera Rang"	Bittu Cheema	Dr Zeus	3:06
3.	"Judaa 2"	Bilal Saeed	Bilal Saeed	4:08
4.	"Naam Gabhru Da"	Happy Raikoti	Dr Zeus	3:30
5.	"Diary"	Happy Raikoti	Dr Zeus	4:12
6.	"Pendu"	Alfaaz	Dr Zeus	2:40
7.	"Judaa 2(U-Mix)"	Bilal Saeed	Bilal Saeed	4:06
8.	"Babul"	Himat Jeet Singh	Dr Zeus	4:28
9.	"Lutti Jaa"	Charan Likhari	Dr Zeus	2:49
10.	"Diary(U-Mix)"	Happy Raikoti	Dr Zeus	4:18
Total length:				36:52

== Reception ==
Song "Mera Deewanapan" topped the Asian Music Chart upon its release. Also, the song remained in the chart for over eight weeks. "Pendu" from the album also entered the chart. "Mera Deewanapan" and "Pendu" were also included in Apple Music 2010s Punjabi essentials playlist.

== Accolades ==
Year	Recipient and nominee	Award Ceremony	Category	Result	Ref(s)
2015	Amrinder Gill ("Judaa 2")	PTC Punjabi Music Awards	Best Album of the Year	Won	
2015	Amrinder Gill ("Judaa 2")	PTC Punjabi Music Awards	Best Pop Vocalist Male For an Album	Won	
2015	Amrinder Gill ("Diary")	PTC Punjabi Music Awards	Best Music Video	Won	
2015	Amrinder Gill ("Diary")	PTC Punjabi Music Awards	Best Romantic Ballad	Nominated	
2015	Sukh Sanghera ("Diary")	PTC Punjabi Music Awards	Best Music Video Director	Nominated	
2015	Amrinder Gill ("Mera Deewanapan")	PTC Punjabi Music Awards	Most Popular Song of the Year	Nominated	
2015	Dr Zeus ("Judaa 2")	PTC Punjabi Music Awards	Best Non Resident Music Director	Won	
2015	Happy Raikoti ("Diary")	PTC Punjabi Music Awards	Best Lyricist	Won	
