= Dooriyan =

Studio album by Amrinder Gill
- Released: 20 November 2009
- Genre: Pop, Bhangra
- Label: Speed Records, Planet Recordz, Kamlee Records
- Producer: Sukhshinder Shinda

Amrinder Gill chronology
Ishq (2007)	Dooriyan (2009)	Judaa (2011)

Dooriyan is a Punjabi album by singer and actor Amrinder Gill. Dooriyan became a highly successful album continuing Amrinder's success from his previous album Ishq. Sukhshinder Shinda gave music to the album, this is the third Amrinder Gill album he has produced (Dildarian and Ishq being the other two).

The music video for Tere Bina has been critically acclaimed, being nominated for an award. It was the first music video from the album. Later music videos for Maar Sutya, Punn Khat Le, Dabbi and Tere Karke were released.

== Track listing ==
All music is composed by Sukshinder Shinda

No.	Title	Lyrics	Length
1.	"Tere Bina"	Pali Giddarbaha	5:43
2.	"Maar Sutya"	Manjit Pandori	3:56
3.	"Dooriyan"	Sukhwinder Guram	4:16
4.	"Tere Karke"	Rana Madho Jhande	3:47
5.	"Mera Ki Haal"	Nimma Loharaka	5:10
6.	"Dabbi"	Jitt Salala	4:21
7.	"Sahan Ton Nere"	Nimma Loharaka	5:18
8.	"Punn Khat Le"	Raj Kakra	3:38
9.	"Dilbara"	Raj Kakra	4:04

== Awards ==
Dooriyan was nominated for several awards at the 2010 Punjabi Music Awards. These awards are:

Nominated	Award	Nomination Work	Result	Lost To
Tom Lowry	Best Sound Recording	Tere Bina	Lost	Honey Singh for Panga
Baljeet S. Deo	Best Music Video Director	Tere Bina Music Video	Lost	Sandeep Sharma for Jinday Ni Jinday
Sukhshinder Shinda	Best Music Director	Tere Bina	Lost	Honey Singh for Desi Daroo
Amrinder Gill	Best Pop Album	Dooriyan	Lost	Diljit Dosanjh for The Next Level
Amrinder Gill	Best Pop Vocalist	Tere Bina	Lost	Nachatter Gill for Chad Ke Na Ja
