= Lahoriye =

- Theatrical release poster
- Directed by: Amberdeep Singh
- Written by: Amberdeep Singh
- Produced by: Amberdeep Singh; Karaj Gill
- Starring: Amrinder Gill; Sargun Mehta; Yuvraj Hans; Nimrat Khaira; Sardar Sohi; Guggu Gill
- Cinematography: Sandeep Patil
- Edited by: Sadik Ali Shaikh
- Music by: Jatinder Shah
- Production companies: Rhythm Boyz Entertainment; Amberdeep Productions
- Distributed by: Omjee Group (India); Rhythm Boyz (International)
- Release date: 12 May 2017
- Running time: 140 mins
- Country: India
- Language: Punjabi

Lahoriye is a 2017 Indian-Punjabi drama film written and directed by Amberdeep Singh. It stars Amrinder Gill, Sargun Mehta, Yuvraj Hans, Nimrat Khaira, Sardar Sohi and Guggu Gill.

Lahoriye is about the effects of the partition of Punjab. The movie deals with the modern India and how two people of different religions and countries begin to love each other and come together by connecting their values of the same culture as Punjabis. The film grossed over $1.5 million in three territories, in its opening weekend. The film grossed over ₹7.25 crore net in India, in its first week.

== Plot ==
Lahoriye is an emotional drama that mostly revolves around two central characters: Kikkar Singh (Amrinder Gill) – a Sikh man from a border town village in Punjab, India; and Ameeran Khan (Sargun Mehta) – a Muslim woman from Lahore, Punjab, Pakistan.

In present-day Punjab, India; Kikkar Singh, while working in his field one day, sees Ameeran on the other side of the Indo-Pak border and falls in love with her. He then visits her in Lahore, Punjab, Pakistan, but before he actually meets her, he is intercepted by Naseem Khan (Yuvraj Hans) – the son of the landlord of Ameeran. Kikkar Singh convinces Naseem Khan of his true and honest love for Ameeran Khan, and subsequently Naseem Khan himself helps Kikkar Singh to meet Ameeran at a family function. Both confess their love to each other and decide to get married. Naseem Khan vows that he would help them in every possible way he could. Later on, Naseem Khan falls in love with Harleen Kaur, Kikkar Singh's sister (Nimrat Khaira).

Although both Kikkar Singh's and Ameeran Khan's family agree to their marriage initially, but due to certain misunderstandings later on, their marriage is called off. The rest of the movie traces the events that affect not just Kikkar Singh and Ameeran Khan, but two old friends who got separated during the partition of India. Then in the climax, the family members realize that Kikkar Singh and Ameeran Khan truly love each other. Then Kikkar is married to Ameeran and Naseem is married to Harleen.

== Cast ==
- Amrinder Gill as Kikkar Singh
- Sargun Mehta as Ameeran Khan
- Yuvraj Hans as Naseem Khan (Ameeran's landlord's son)
- Nimrat Khaira as Harleen Kaur (Kikkar's cousin)
- Sardar Sohi as Harbans Singh (Kikkar's father)
- Guggu Gill as Zorawar Singh
- Nirmal Rishi as Tejparkash Kaur (Kikkar's mother)
- Hobby Dhaliwal as Chaudhary (Naseem's father)
- Rajiv Thakur as Kikkar's friend
- Amberdeep Singh as Taufiq (cameo appearance)
- Sandeep Malhi as Ameeran's sis-in-law
- Gagan Mehra as Gagandeep

== Track list ==
S.No	Track	Singer	Lyrics	Music
1.	"Akhar"	Amrinder Gill	Surinder Sadhpuri	Jatinder Shah
2.	"Akhar" (Female Version)	Nimrat Khaira	Surinder Sadhpuri	Jatinder Shah
3.	"Chunni"	Amrinder Gill	Preet Mangat	Jatinder Shah
4.	"Jeeondean Ch"	Amrinder Gill	Fateh Shergill	Jatinder Shah
5.	"Paani Ravi Da"	Amrinder Gill & Neha Bhasin	Harmanjeet	Jatinder Shah
6.	"Gutt Ch Lahore"	Amrinder Gill & Sunidhi Chauhan	Harmanjeet	Jatinder Shah
7.	"Janjhan"	Gurpreet Mann	Mann Hundal	Jatinder Shah
8.	"Saah"	Bir Singh	Bir Singh	Jatinder Shah
9.	"Mitti Da Putla"	Gurshabad	Harmanjeet	Jatinder Shah

== Awards and nominations ==
Award	Date of ceremony (Note: Date is linked to the article about the awards held that year, wherever possible.)	Category	Recipient	Result
Filmfare Awards Punjabi	23 March 2018	Best Film	Lahoriye	Won
Filmfare Awards Punjabi	23 March 2018	Best Actor	Amrinder Gill	Won
Filmfare Awards Punjabi	23 March 2018	Best Actress	Sargun Mehta	Won
Filmfare Awards Punjabi	23 March 2018	Best Debut Director	Amberdeep Singh	Won
Filmfare Awards Punjabi	23 March 2018	Best Music Album	Jatinder Shah	Won
Filmfare Awards Punjabi	23 March 2018	Best Playback Singer (Male)	Amrinder Gill – Akhar	Won
Filmfare Awards Punjabi	23 March 2018	Best Playback Singer (Female)	Neha Bhasin – Paani Ravi Da	Won
Filmfare Awards Punjabi	23 March 2018	Best Dialogues	Amberdeep Singh	Won
Filmfare Awards Punjabi	23 March 2018	Best Production Design	Tariq Umar Khan	Won
Filmfare Awards Punjabi	23 March 2018	Best Film (Critics)	Lahoriye	Nominated
Filmfare Awards Punjabi	23 March 2018	Best Actress (Critics)	Sargun Mehta	Nominated
Filmfare Awards Punjabi	23 March 2018	Best Debut Female	Nimrat Khaira	Nominated
Filmfare Awards Punjabi	23 March 2018	Best Supporting Actor	Gugu Gill	Nominated
Filmfare Awards Punjabi	23 March 2018	Best Supporting Actress	Nirmal Rishi	Nominated
Filmfare Awards Punjabi	23 March 2018	Best Lyrics	Surinder Sadhpuri – Akhar	Nominated
Filmfare Awards Punjabi	23 March 2018	Best Editing	Sadik Ali Shaikh	Nominated
Filmfare Awards Punjabi	23 March 2018	Best Background Score	Jatinder Shah	Nominated
Filmfare Awards Punjabi	23 March 2018	Best Cinematography	Sandeep Patil	Nominated
Filmfare Awards Punjabi	23 March 2018	Best Original Story	Amberdeep Singh	Nominated
Filmfare Awards Punjabi	23 March 2018	Best Screenplay	Amberdeep Singh	Nominated
PTC Punjabi Film Awards	30 March 2018	Best Film	Lahoriye	Won
PTC Punjabi Film Awards	30 March 2018	Best Director	Amberdeep Singh	Won
PTC Punjabi Film Awards	30 March 2018	Best Actor	Amrinder Gill	Won
PTC Punjabi Film Awards	30 March 2018	Best Actress	Sargun Mehta	Won
PTC Punjabi Film Awards	30 March 2018	Best Music Director	Jatinder Shah – Akhar	Won
PTC Punjabi Film Awards	30 March 2018	Best Screenplay	Amberdeep Singh	Won
PTC Punjabi Film Awards	30 March 2018	Most Popular Song of the year	Akhar – Amrinder Gill	Nominated
PTC Punjabi Film Awards	30 March 2018	Best Supporting Actor	Gugu Gill	Nominated
PTC Punjabi Film Awards	30 March 2018	Best Supporting Actor	Yuvraj Hans	Nominated
PTC Punjabi Film Awards	30 March 2018	Best Supporting Actress	Balwinder Begowal	Nominated
PTC Punjabi Film Awards	30 March 2018	Best Debut Director	Amberdeep Singh	Nominated
PTC Punjabi Film Awards	30 March 2018	Best Debut Female	Nimrat Khaira	Nominated
PTC Punjabi Film Awards	30 March 2018	Best Playback Singer (Female)	Neha Bhasin – Paani Ravi Da	Nominated
PTC Punjabi Film Awards	30 March 2018	Best Playback Singer (Male)	Amrinder Gill – Akhar	Nominated
PTC Punjabi Film Awards	30 March 2018	Best Lyricist	Bir Singh – Saah	Nominated
PTC Punjabi Film Awards	30 March 2018	Best Story	Amberdeep Singh	Nominated
PTC Punjabi Film Awards	30 March 2018	Best Background Score	Jatinder Shah	Nominated
Brit Asia Punjabi Film Awards	12 May 2018	Best Actress	Sargun Mehta	Won
Brit Asia Punjabi Film Awards	12 May 2018	Best Film	Lahoriye	Nominated
Brit Asia Punjabi Film Awards	12 May 2018	Best Director	Amberdeep Singh	Nominated
Brit Asia Punjabi Film Awards	12 May 2018	Best Actor	Amrinder Gill	Nominated
Brit Asia Punjabi Film Awards	12 May 2018	Best Cinematography	Sandeep Patil	Nominated
Brit Asia Punjabi Film Awards	12 May 2018	Best Soundtrack	Lahoriye	Nominated
Brit Asia Punjabi Film Awards	12 May 2018	Best Film Song	Akhar - Amrinder Gill	Nominated
Brit Asia Punjabi Film Awards	12 May 2018	Best Supporting Actor	Gugu Gill	Nominated
Brit Asia Punjabi Film Awards	12 May 2018	Best Supporting Actor	Yuvraj Hans	Nominated
Brit Asia Punjabi Film Awards	12 May 2018	Best Supporting Actress	Nimrat Khaira	Nominated
Brit Asia Punjabi Film Awards	12 May 2018	Best Male Playback Vocalist	Amrinder Gill - Akhar	Nominated
Brit Asia Punjabi Film Awards	12 May 2018	Best Debut Performance	Nimrat Khaira	Nominated
