= Shahkot =

Shahkot may refer to:

- Shahkot, India, a town and municipality in Jalandhar district, Punjab, India
  - Shahkot (Assembly Constituency), Punjab Legislative Assembly constituency in Punjab, India
- Shahkot, Pakistan, a town and tehsil of Nankana Sahib District, Punjab, Pakistan
