= Dildarian =

Studio album by Amrinder Gill
- Released: 2005
- Genre: Punjabi, pop
- Length: 34 Minutes
- Label: Music Waves/Kamlee
- Producer: Sukshinder Shinda

Amrinder Gill chronology
Desi Fever (2004)	Dildarian (2005)	Kamli Kudiye (2006)

Dildarian is a studio album by Punjabi singer and actor, Amrinder Gill. This was Amrinder's second ever major success after his previous album Ik Vaada. The album was composed by the "music man", Sukshinder Shinda and had lyrics by Raj Kakra, Dev Raj Jassal, Amarjit Sandhar, Jassi Jallandri, Amerdeep Gill and Satti Khokhewalia.

== Track listing ==
All music composed by Sukshinder Shinda.

Dildarian
No.	Title	Lyrics	Length
1.	"Dildarian"	Raj Kakra	4:06
2.	"Daru"	Dev Raj Jassal	4:37
3.	"Sohni Kuri"	Amarjit Sandhar	3:56
4.	"Pardes"	Raj Kakra	5:01
5.	"Manke"	Jassi Jallandri	4:12
6.	"Hanju"	Amerdeep Gill	4:48
7.	"Lak Patle"	Satti Khokhewalia	3:48
8.	"Punjabi Munde"	Satti Khokhewalia	4:19
Total length:			34:37

== Awards ==
The album was nominated for a three awards at the 2006 Punjabi Music Awards:

- Best Music Video for Dildarian
- Best Pop Album for Dildarian
- Best Pop Vocalist (Male) for Sohni Kudi (Mail Karade)
