= Golak Bugni Bank Te Batua =

2018 film directed by Ksshitij Chaudhary

- Theatrical poster
- Directed by: Ksshitij Chaudhary
- Written by: Dheeraj Rattan
- Produced by: Karaj Gill; Munish Sahni; Talwinder Hayre
- Starring: Harish Verma; Simi Chahal; Amrinder Gill; Aditi Sharma; Jaswinder Bhalla; B.N. Sharma
- Cinematography: Parixit Warrier
- Edited by: Rikki Kajle
- Music by: Jatinder Shah
- Production companies: Rhythm Boyz Entertainment; Hayre Omjee Studios
- Distributed by: Omjee Group
- Release date: 13 April 2018
- Running time: 140 mins
- Country: India
- Language: Punjabi
- Box office: ₹18.2 crore (US$1.9 million)

Golak Bugni Bank Te Batua is a 2018 comedy Indian-Punjabi film directed by Ksshitij Chaudhary. It stars Amrinder Gill, Aditi Sharma, Simi Chahal, Harish Verma, Jaswinder Bhalla, B.N. Sharma in lead roles. Golak Bugni Bank Te Batua was released worldwide on 13 April 2018.

A sequel, Golak Bugni Bank Te Batua 2, directed by Janjot Singh was set to release in February 2023 but has been delayed.

== Plot ==
The story starts in India in 1977–78 and the story goes back and forth between 1977–78 and 2016. The story starts with Bhola in 1977 in the village of Bassi Pathana in Punjab, India. Bhola is an innocent young man who is helpful and kind to all. He usually helps the villagers. The story comes to present time in 2016 where in Bassi Pathana there is a market where two shop owners Chaman Laal Sachdeva and Satpal Aneja are portrayed. The two are rivals and want to be the market heads. Neeta, son of Chaman Laal works with him in their ladies suit shop and Mishri and her father Satpal runs a sweet shop. Both are shown hating each other because of the family rivalry but soon comes closer. They elope because of their fathers; denial for their marriage with the funds collected for Jaagran on 8 November 2016 and go to a hotel to stay for night.

But things turn upside down when the ₹500 and ₹1000 notes are demonetised by the Govt. They return to their homes and start living life normally. Neeta sees their friend Kiran's marriage being pulled back due to the dowry amount not being given and with help of Mishri and her friends tries to arrange the dowry.

Here we see a flashback where Bhola was at Shindi's house and Shindi's brother disliked his presence there and takes him to the panchayat where he is asked by the panchayat to marry Shindi if he can build a house for themselves at a land allotted by panchayat which will take ₹1000 to construct.

He accepts this and wants to earn money, He went back with money but the demonetization in 1978 under Janta Party Government led to the earnings going in vain. The villagers helped him and the story is set back to 2016 where at the wedding of Kiran the Neeta and Mishri succeed in convincing Kiran's father-in-law to let the wedding happen.

== Cast ==
- Harish Verma as Neeta
- Simi Chahal as Mishri
- Amrinder Gill as Bhola
- Aditi Sharma as Shindi
- Jaswinder Bhalla as Chaman Lal Sachdeva
- Simran Sehajpal as Neeta's mother
- B.N. Sharma as Satpal aneja Halwai
- Anita Devgan as Gollu's mother
- Sumit Gulati as Gollu
- Rohit sawal as Sonu (hair dresser)
- Pukhraj Bhalla as Kala
- Gurshabad as Doji (Milkman)
- Rajesh Sharma (actor) as Money Exchanger
- Gagan Mehra as Kiran
- Vijay Tandon as MLA
- Ashok Pathak as Chandan
- Master Saleem as himself (cameo appearance)

== Soundtrack ==
S.No	Track	Singer	Lyrics	Music
1.	"Aisi Taisi"	Amrinder Gill	Sabir Ali Sabir	Jatinder Shah
2.	"Lakh Waari"	Amrinder Gill	Happy Raikoti	Jatinder Shah
3.	"Selfie"	Gurshabad	Sidhu Sarbjit	Jatinder Shah
4.	"Tu Te Main"	Bir Singh	Bir Singh	Jatinder Shah
5.	"Phullan Di Vel"	Sunidhi Chauhan	Bir Singh	Jatinder Shah
6.	"Sarkaare"	Gurpreet Mann & Bikk Dhillon	Bikk Dhillon	Jatinder Shah
