= Bilal Saeed =

Pakistani Singer-songwriter

- Bilal Saeed
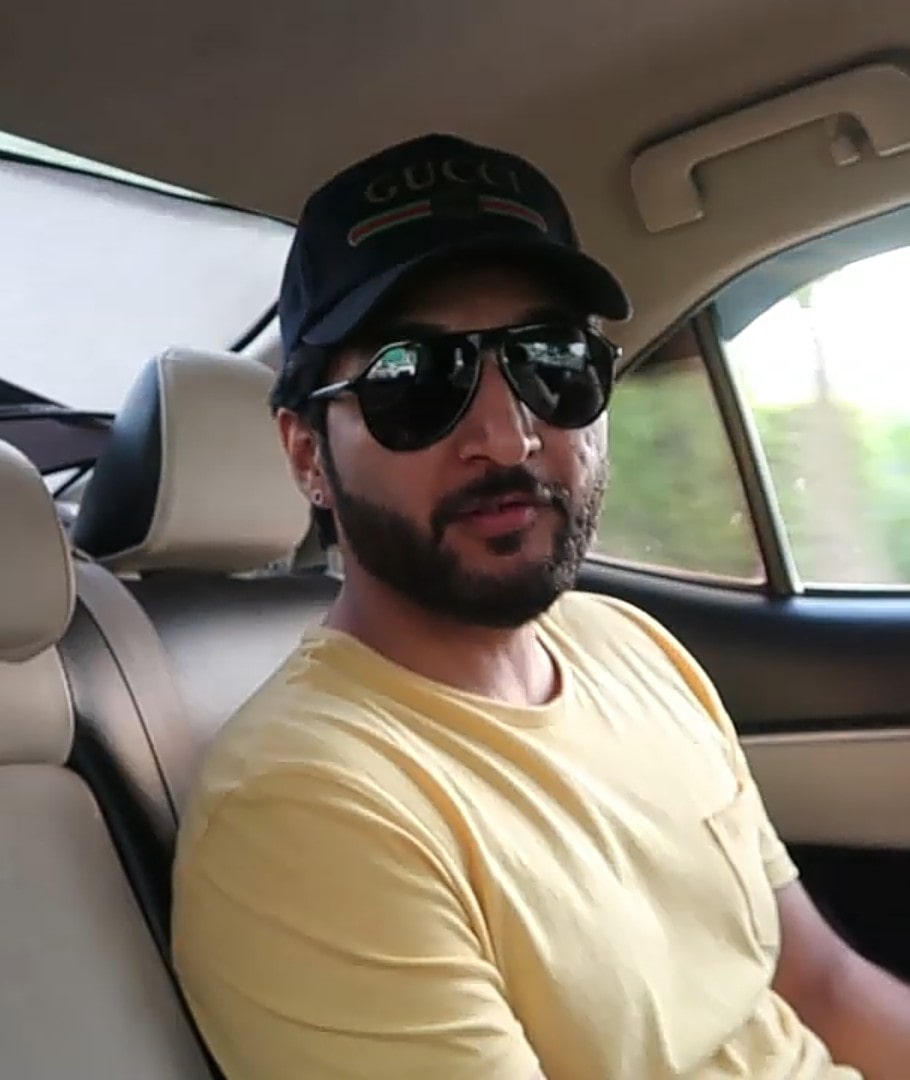
- A picture of Saeed
- Born: 12 December 1988 (age 37); Sialkot, Punjab, Pakistan
- Occupations: Singer; songwriter; producer
- Height: 1.8 m (5 ft 11 in)
- Awards: See below
- Musical career
- Instruments: Vocals, piano, guitar
- Years active: 2011–present
- Labels: Lightning Records, Zee Music Company, Desi Music Factory, Beyond Records, envyworldwide, Hi-Tec Music Ltd, Times Music, Speed Records, One Two Records

Bilal Saeed (Punjabi, Urdu: بلال سعید; born 12 December 1988) is a Pakistani singer-songwriter, music producer and composer. He is best known for his singles "12 Saal", "Adhi Adhi Raat " and 'Teri Khair Mangdi", the latter of which was also used in the 2016 Bollywood film Baar Baar Dekho.

== Early life ==
Bilal Saeed was born on 12 December 1988 in Sialkot, Punjab, Pakistan. He developed an interest in music from a young age and began writing songs while in high school. Before establishing himself as a singer, he worked as a composer and songwriter in recording studios for several years.

Saeed began his career as a music composer and songwriter before making his singing debut with the single "12 Saal" in 2011. The song became his breakthrough and brought him widespread attention within the Punjabi music scene. He followed it with "Adhi Adhi Raat" in 2012, which further increased his popularity.

His early success was followed by the release of his debut album Twelve, which featured collaborations with artists including Dr Zeus, Amrinder Gill and Young Fateh.His subsequent work expanded his audience beyond Pakistan, including collaborations and projects connected with the Indian music and film industries.

== Career ==
In 2012, he released his new single "Mahi Mahi" and debut album "Twelve" which received two nominees at PTC Punjabi Music Award for Best Non Residents Punjabi Album and Best Non Resident Punjabi Vocalist. The album also featured Dr Zeus, Amrinder Gill and Fateh. The single "Khair Mangdi" from the album Twelve was nominated as Song of the Year at 13th Lux Style Awards. In 2013, for the first time he recorded songs for a film, i.e. "Tauba Tauba" and "Rattan Chitian" from Daddy Cool Munde Fool 2013 Punjabi film. In 2014, he released a single "Lethal Combination" with Roach Killa under Speed Records in 2014. The single topped BBC Asian Charts. Later in December 2014, he composed a tribute song "Maan" on Peshawar Attack (Black Day Pakistan, 16 December 2014), to condemn the attackers of APS School, Peshawar. He also released a single "Kaash (A Wish)" in 2015 which topped the iTunes Chart. He made his Bollywood debut in 2015 by composing soundtrack of the film Ishqedarriyaan with Jeet Ganguly and Jaidev Kumar. He released another single in 2016, "Paranday", followed by "Blah Blah Blah" featuring Punjabi rapper Young Desi in August 2016. In 2016, the remake of his song "Khair Mangdi" featured in Karan Johar's Bollywood movie Baar Baar Dekho. In September 2016, he made his Lollywood debut by composing a song "Chulbul" for Pakistani Film Zindagi Kitni Haseen Hay. In January 2017, Bilal Saeed released "No Makeup", which featured Bohemia. Later in 2017, he released another single "Twinkle Twinkle" along with Young Desi in August. In early November he released another single "Suroor" with Neha Kakkar on 3 November. His 2012 song, "Adhi Adhi Raat" has a lyric which has become a meme sensation in 2019. In November 2019 Bilal released another single, "Baari", feat Momina Mustehsan under One Two Records. In November 2020, Bilal Saeed released the sequel of "Baari", feat Momina Mustehsan named "Uchiyaan Deewara" under One Two Records.

== Controversy ==
In 2021, a video of Bilal Saeed fighting with his brother and proceeding to kick and punch him, went viral on social media.

== Discography ==
=== Albums ===
Year	Album	Record Label	Co-Singer(s)	Writer(s)	Composer(s)
2012	Twelve	Speed Records	Dr Zeus, Young Fateh, Shortie, Amrinder Gill	Bilal Saeed, Shortie, Dr Zeus	Bilal Saeed, Dr Zeus
2024	Superstar	One Two Records	Talha Anjum, Asim Azhar, Young Desi, Aima Baig, Fateh	Bilal Saeed, Asim Azhar, Talha Anjum, Young Desi, Bablu Sodhi	Bilal Saeed, Black Virus, Asim Azhar

=== Singles ===
Year	Song	Singer(s)	Composer(s)	Writer(s)	Label
2011	Teriyaan Ve	Amanat Ali	Bilal Saeed		
2011	Desi Thumka	Nouman Khalid, Osama Com Laude	Bilal Saeed		Bilal Saeed
2013	Teri Yaadan	Muskan Jay	Bilal Saeed		Bilal Saeed
2013	Jaan Mukdi	Vikas Ali	Bilal Saeed		Bilal Saeed
2014	Mul Nae Labda Pyar	Waqar Ex, Shortie	Bilal Saeed, Waqar Ex, Shortie		
2014	Pul Janeya (Pyar Na Kareen)	Tariq Khan	Bilal Saeed		–
2014	Ranjha	Somee Chohan	Bilal Saeed		High Zone Records/Beyond Records
2014	Soniye	DJ Abbas Bashi	Bilal Saeed		–
2015	Hunjoo	Sadia Khan	Bilal Saeed		Hi-Tech Music Ltd
2015	Breakup	DJ Abbas Bashi	Bilal Saeed		–
2015	Nasha Nasha	Nouman Khalid	Bilal Saeed, Nouman Khalid		–
2016	Sukoon	Asim Subhani	Bilal Saeed		–
2018	La La La	Neha Kakkar, Arjun Kanungo	Bilal Saeed		Desi Music Factory
2018	Snapchat Story	Bilal Saeed ft. Romee Khan	Bilal Saeed		Desi Music Factory
2018	Maine Peeli	Romee khan ft. Muhfaad	Bilal Saeed		Desi Music Factory
2018	Baarish	Bilal Saeed	Bilal Saeed		Desi Music Factory
2018	Baarish	Neha Kakkar	Bilal Saeed		Desi Music Factory
2018	Lambiya Judaiyn	Bilal Saeed	Bilal Saeed		Desi Music Factory
2018	Raanjha Ban Jana	Bilal Saeed Ft Neha Kakkar	Raanjha Ban Jana	Bilal Saeed	Falak Records
2019	Baari	Bilal Saeed and Momina Mustehsan	Bilal Saeed	Bilal Saeed	One Two Records
2020	Chaskay	Bilal Saeed x Roach Killa ft Izzat Fatima	Bilal Saeed	Bilal Saeed	One Two Records
2020	Qubool	Bilal Saeed	Bilal Saeed	Bilal Saeed	One Two Records
2020	Uchiyaan Dewaraan (Baari 2)	Bilal Saeed and Momina Mustehsan	Bilal Saeed	Bilal Saeed	One Two Records
2021	BILAL SAEED MASHUP 2021	Bilal Saeed ft DJ Fluke	Bilal Saeed	Bilal Saeed	Bilal Saeed Music
2022	3 saal	Bilal Saeed			

== Film ==
Year	Film	Song	Composer(s)	Writer(s)	Co-singer(s)	Notes
2013	Daddy Cool Munde Fool	Tauba Ishq	Dr Zeus	Bilal Saeed	Dr Zeus	Punjabi film
2013	Daddy Cool Munde Fool	Rattan Chitian	Dr Zeus	Bilal Saeed	–	Punjabi film
2013	Daddy Cool Munde Fool	Rattan Chitian (With Rap)	Dr Zeus	Bilal Saeed	Young Fateh, Dr Zeus	Punjabi film
2014	Heropanti	Tere Bina	Mustafa Zahid, Bilal Saeed		Mustafa Zahid	Hindi film
2015	Ishqedarriyaan	Mohabbat Yeh	Bilal Saeed	Billal Saeed	–	Hindi film
2015	Ishqedarriyaan	Mohabbat Yeh (Reprise)	Bilal Saeed	Billal Saeed	Asees Kaur	Hindi film
2016	Baar Baar Dekho	Teri Khair Mangdi	Bilal Saeed	Kumaar, Bilal Saeed	–	Hindi film
2016	Zindagi Kitni Haseen Hay	Better Half (Chulbul)	Bilal Saeed	Bilal Saeed	Sana Zulfiqar	Urdu film
2018	Baazaar	La La La	Bilal Saeed	Bilal Saeed	Neha Kakkar	Hindi film
2020	Dostana 2	Dilliwaliye Ni			Neha Kakkar	Hindi film

== Awards and nominations ==
Year	Nominee / work	Award	Result
2013	"12 Saal"	PTC Punjabi Music Award for Best Pop Vocalist	Nominated
2013	"Twelve"	PTC Punjabi Music Award for Best Non Residents Punjabi Album	Nominated
2013	"Twelve"	Punjabi Music Award for Best Non Resident Punjabi Vocalist	Nominated
2014	"Khair Mangdi"	Lux Style Award for Song of the Year	Nominated
2015	"Bilal Saeed"	Pakistani Music and Media Awards for Best Producer	Won
2015	"Bilal Saeed"	Pakistani Music and Media Awards for Best International Act	Won
2015	"Bilal Saeed"	Brit Asia Music Award for Best Songwriter	Nominated
2015	"Lethal Combination"	Brit Asia Music Award for Best Single UK	Nominated
2020	"Baari"	PISA Award for the Best Song of the Year(2019)	Won
