= Goreyan Nu Daffa Karo =

- Theatrical release poster
- Directed by: Pankaj Batra
- Written by: Amberdeep Singh
- Screenplay by: Amberdeep Singh
- Produced by: Suresh Kumar; Monty Shoor; Sukhjinder Bhachu; Aman Khatkar; Manmord Sidhu
- Starring: Amrinder Gill; Amrit Maghera; Yograj Singh; Aman Khatkar; Binnu Dhillon; Rana Ranbir; Terence H. Winkless; Karamjit Anmol; Sardar Sohi
- Cinematography: Vineet Malhotra
- Music by: Jatinder Shah
- Production companies: Speed Records; Rhythm Boyz
- Release date: 12 September 2014
- Running time: 125 minutes
- Country: India
- Language: Punjabi

Goreyan Nu Daffa Karo is a 2014 Indian Punjabi-language romantic comedy film starring Amrinder Gill and actress Amrit Maghera.

== Plot ==
For Kala, a boy from a village in Punjab, India, it is love at first sight when he sees Aleesha, an Indo-Canadian girl. Kala also helps clear obstacles in the way of marriage of his brother Roop to his white Canadian girlfriend, Julia. Roop's father does not want him marrying a white girl. Kala fights the cultural and historical differences to bring together and unite the two families.

== Production ==
The film is shot at locations in India and Canada.

== Cast ==
- Amrinder Gill as Kala
- Amrit Maghera as Aleesha
- Yograj Singh as Najar Singh
- Binnu Dhillon as Maan Saab
- Aman Khatkar as Roop
- Terence H. Winkless as Albert
- Rana Ranbir as Uday Partap Singh
- Karamjit Anmol as Kala's uncle
- Sardar Sohi as Kala's uncle
- Azam aylaa Nokhandan as Julia

== Soundtrack ==
No.	Title	Singer(s)	Length
1.	"Goreyan Nu Daffa Karo"	Amrinder Gill, Shipra Goyal
2.	"Pyaar Tere Da Assar"	Prabh Gill
3.	"Laazmi"	Amrinder Gill
4.	"Chadhi Aa Jawani"	Amrinder Gill
5.	"Mora - Duet"	Amrinder Gill, Karamjit Anmol
6.	"Jane Dil"	Kamal Khan, Jaspinder Narula
7.	"Mora"	Karamjit Anmol
8.	"Goreyan Nu Daffa Karo"	Manj Musik, Shipra Goyal
9.	"Dishkyuon"	Daler Mehndi

== Awards ==
=== PTC Punjabi Film Awards 2015 ===
==== Won ====
- Best Screenplay – Amberdeep Singh

==== Nominations ====
- Best Story writer – Amberdeep Singh
- Best Screenplay – Amberdeep Singh
- Best Dialogues – Amberdeep Singh
- Best Music Director – Jatinder Shah
- Best playback Singer(male) – Prabh Gill
- Popular Song of the year – Prabh Gill & Amrinder Gill
- Best performance in comic role – Binnu Dhillon
- Best Supporting Actor – Yograj Singh
- Best Director – Pankaj Batra
- Best Actor – Amrinder Gill
- Best Film
