= Love Punjab =

- Theatrical release poster
- Directed by: Rajiv Dhingra
- Written by: Amberdeep Singh
- Produced by: Amarbir Singh Sandhu; Karaj Gill; Jaspal Singh Sandhu
- Starring: Amrinder Gill; Sargun Mehta; Yograj Singh; Nirmal Rishi
- Cinematography: Navneet Misser
- Edited by: Omkarnath Bhakri
- Music by: Jatinder Shah
- Production companies: Rhythm Boyz Entertainment; J Studio
- Distributed by: White Hill Studios
- Release date: 11 March 2016
- Running time: 131 minutes
- Countries: India, Canada
- Language: Punjabi

Love Punjab is a 2016 Punjabi film directed by Rajiv Dhingra, written by Amberdeep Singh and starring Amrinder Gill, Sargun Mehta and Manvir Johal as the main protagonists of the film. This film is about a journey of a family to find love, ties of families and fragrance of Punjab and was released on 11 March 2016.

== Plot ==
Pargat and Jessica are a couple who are going through a separation for various reasons. They together have a son named Manveer who has his own set of problems in school, where he faces racism and discrimination issues. Manveer goes into deep depression and on the recommendation of the doctor, his parents decide to take him to Punjab to show his roots, culture and ancestral village. Jessica somehow convinces her father-in-law, Brar Sarpanch to show Manveer that Punjab is better than Canada. Pargat, Jessica, and Manvir go to Punjab together for 15 days. Pargat and Jessica act like a happy couple, as Pargat's parents do not know about their impending divorce. After spending time with each other without any interference of work and grind of daily busy life, their love for each other is re-kindled, but they do not tell each other. Manveer is better and enjoying life again. They come back to Canada and get divorced. After the divorce, Jessica is set to get engaged to Zora, Jessica's childhood friend. Pargat realizes that he loves Jessica and can not live without her. At the engagement, Manvir steals the engagement ring but returns it. Pargat fakes a phone call from his father and Jessica finds out that they still don't know about divorce. Jessica realizes that Pargat was lying and goes outside, citing a network problem. Jessica later leaves her engagement, hops into her car and drives to their home. They have a small argument, and then Pargat confesses his love for her and they patch up. One year later, the couple has a baby girl and they plan to go to Punjab again. The film ends when Parget gets a phone call from his parents and he tells them they are coming to visit.

== Cast ==
- Sargun Mehta as Jessica Brar
- Amrinder Gill as Pargat Brar
- Yograj Singh as Pargat's father
- Nirmal Rishi as Pargat's mother
- Binnu Dhillon as Naseem (Pargat's neighbour)
- Gurmeet Saajan as scientist
- Rana Ranbir as school teacher (special appearance)
- Harj Nagra as Zora (Jessica's childhood friend)
- Amberdeep Singh as Pargat's friend (special appearance)
- Manvir Johal as Manveer/Tuti
- Simran Raien as Naseem's sister
- Arshi Bains as Jessica's friend
- Harmeet Gill as Jessica's mother
- Harbilas Sangha as Pada
- Hardeep Gill as Pargat's chacha
- Ravinder Kaur as Pargat's chachi
- Mor Cue as Divorce lawyer
- Bethany Myers as Julia
- Alyssa Andronyk as the voice of Julia

== Track list ==
S. No.	Track	Singer	Lyrics	Music
1.	"Heerey"	Amrinder Gill	Bir Singh	Jatinder Shah
2.	"Shaan Wakhri"	Amrinder Gill	Veet Baljit	Jatinder Shah
3.	"Zindagi"	Amrinder Gill	Raj Kakra	Jatinder Shah
4.	"Goriyan Bahavan"	Amrinder Gill	Bittu Cheema	Jatinder Shah
5.	"Akhiyan De Taare"	Kapil Sharma	Happy Raikoti	Jatinder Shah
6.	"Dowein Nain"	Jenny Johal	Bunty Bains	Jatinder Shah
7.	"Des"	Ranjit Bawa	Happy Raikoti	Jatinder Shah

== Trailer controversy ==
Love Punjab trailer was initially released on 20 February 2016 but in a major controversy this trailer was removed by a fake application to YouTube inc compelling Amrinder Gill to lodge a police complaint. Trailer was again uploaded by producers and was liked by audience.

== Box office ==
Love Punjab had grossed ₹15.5 crore in overseas including ₹6.98 crore in Canada, ₹2.83 crore in United States, ₹1.09 crore in United Kingdom, ₹3.54 crore in Australia and ₹88.38 lacs in New Zealand.

First time in history of Punjabi cinema two major Superstars' films were released on same day, Love Punjab and Ardaas.

Love Punjab shattered the records of Bollywood movies Ranveer Singh's Bajirao Mastani and Akshay Kumar's Airlift in the international market breaking the opening weekend box office collection record with a big margin. In Australia and New Zealand, Love Punjab grossed ₹2.07 crore (US$210,000) from the Australian box office and ₹51.91 lakh (US$54,000) from the New Zealand box office. While Bajirao Mastani minted ₹1.44 crore (US$150,000) from Australian box office and from New Zealand box office it minted ₹26.50 lakh (US$28,000).

On the other hand, Airlift grossed ₹93 lakh (US$97,000) from Australia and ₹36 lakh (US$37,000) from New Zealand.

=== Critical response ===
The Tribune reviewed Love Punjab by giving 3.5 stars out of 5 and added “film take you on a journey to discover your roots and make you proud of them.”
