= Daddy Cool Munde Fool =

- Directed by: Simerjit Singh
- Screenplay by: Amberdeep Singh; Rajan Agarwal
- Story by: Rajan Agarwal
- Produced by: Speed Records
- Starring: Amrinder Gill; Harish Verma; Yuvika Chaudhary; Ihana Dhillon; Jaswinder Bhalla; Amar Noorie; Rana Ranbir
- Edited by: Bunty Nagi
- Music by: Dr. Zeus
- Production company: Speed Records
- Distributed by: White Hill Studios
- Release date: 12 April 2013
- Country: India
- Language: Punjabi

Daddy Cool Munde Fool (English: Daddy Cool Boys Fool) is a 2013 Punjabi-language Indian film starring Amrinder Gill, Harish Verma, Ihana Dhillon, Yuvika Chaudhary, Jaswinder Bhalla, Amar Noorie and Karamjeet Anmol. Harish Verma and Amrinder Gill were seen together for the first time in this film.

Daddy Cool Munde Fool is directed by Simerjit Singh and was released on 12 April 2013 under the banners KG Productions, Royal Ent. and Celluloid Entertainment. It is a Speed Records Home production after "Jatt and Juliet". Music of the film was given by Dr. Zeus and shooting of the movie started March onwards in India.

A sequel Daddy Cool Munde Fool 2, was set to release in 2021 but has been delayed.

== Plot ==
Widower Parminder Singh Puppy is worried about the future of his careless and spoilt sons Gunni and Manni. Both the sons fall in love with two sisters Rinki and Minki. Parminder is planning his own wedding with a widow Dilraaj Kaur Dil who was his lover during college and unknown to him, is the mother of Rinki and Minki. Parminder is also unaware of their sons' love lives. Parminder and his sons go to Dilraaj's house with a marriage proposal, with the father unaware that his sons want to marry and sons unaware of their father's wishes. This follows a lot of chaos and drama in their lives.

== Reception ==
At the box office Daddy Cool Munde Fool scored the fifth highest Punjabi film opening week collections at the time of release with an opening week collection of ₹2.60 crore.

== Cast ==
- Amrinder Gill as Manni
- Harish Verma as Gunni
- Jaswinder Bhalla as Parminder Singh 'Pappi' Tiwana
- Amar Noorie as Dilraaj Kaur 'Dil'
- Yuvika Chaudhary as Rinki
- Ihana Dhillon as Minki
- Sardar Sohi as Kharag Singh
- Rana Ranbir as Pilla
- Upasna Singh as Preto/Rajjo
- Karamjit Anmol as Golu

== Soundtrack ==
Daddy Cool Munde Fool

Soundtrack album by Amrinder Gill, Bilal Saeed, Jassi Gill and Aman Sarang
- Released: 19 March 2013
- Genre: Film soundtrack
- Length: 36:44
- Label: Speed Records
- Producer: Ruby-Dinesh

The soundtrack album was released on 19 March 2013.

Track listing
| No. | Title | Lyrics | Performed by | Length |
|---|---|---|---|---|
| 1. | "Tauba Ishq" | Bilal Saeed | Bilal Saeed, Dr. Zeus | 3:15 |
| 2. | "Lagda Naa Jee" | Nimma Loharka | Amrinder Gill | 3:34 |
| 3. | "Classmate" | Bunty Bains | Jassi Gill, Desi Crew | 4:52 |
| 4. | "Rattan Chitian" | Bilal Saeed | Bilal Saeed | 3:03 |
| 5. | "Sohni Lagdi Tun" | Nimma Loharka | Amrinder Gill | 2:38 |
| 6. | "Pawareh" | Nimma Loharka | Amrinder Gill | 2:58 |
| 7. | "Daddy Cool" | Afzal Sahir | Aman Sarang, Shortie Littlelox, Bambi, Fateh | 3:19 |
| 8. | "Classmate (Desi Crew Mix)" | Bunty Bains | Kaur B, Jassi Gill & Desi Crew | 4:15 |
| 9. | "Mashup Daddy Cool" | Dr.Zeus, Nimma Loharka, Bilal Saeed, Bunty Bains | Dr.Zeus | 6:47 |
| 10. | "Rattan Chitian With Rap" | Bilal Saeed | Young Fateh, Dr. Zeus & Bilal Saeed | 3:03 |
