= PTC Punjabi =

Indian television network

- Broadcast area: Europe, India, North America, Oceania, Asia-Pacific
- Network: PTC Network
- Affiliates: Badal family
- Headquarters: Delhi, India

Programming
- Picture format: 576i SDTV

Ownership
- Owner: G Next Media Private Limited
- Key people: Rabindra Narayan (Managing Director and President)

History
- Launched: 6 August 2008

Links
- Website: ptcpunjabi.co.in

PTC Punjabi is an Indian Punjabi-language television network. Indian politician and the president of the Shiromani Akali Dal Sukhbir Singh Badal holds a majority stake in PTC. It features general interest programming including news, dramas, comedies, music and talk shows. PTC Punjabi commenced operations on 6 August 2008 and in a year, became the most popular television network in Punjab, India.

In 2009, PTC Punjabi expanded its reach globally. It launched in the United States on DirecTV on 23 August 2009. In September 2009, a Canadian version launched. In early 2010, PTC Punjabi was removed from DirecTV for unknown reasons. On 25 August 2010, PTC Punjabi launched on Dish Network, making the channel available in the United States once again. PTC hosts the annual PTC Punjabi Music Awards and PTC Punjabi Film Awards.

== Channels ==
Channel	Launched	Programming	Notes
PTC News	2007	News	
PTC Punjabi	2008	GEC	
PTC Chak De	2008	Music	
Oscar Movies Bhojpuri	2014	Movies	
PTC Punjabi Gold	2019	Movies	
PTC Music	2019	Music	
PTC Simran	2019	Religious	

== PTC Punjabi Music Awards ==
PTC Punjabi Music Awards are presented annually by PTC Punjabi to honour both artistic and technical excellence of professionals in the Punjabi language music industry of India.

== Sexual assault allegations ==
A contestant for the PTC Miss Punjaban pageant alleged that she had been kept in custody against her will and was pressured for sexual favours. PTC managing director Rabindra Narayan denied these allegations. The allegations led to calls for withdrawal of Gurbani telecast rights from PTC. The managing director of PTC network, Rabindra Narayan, was taken into custody on charges of sexual harassment, using criminal force on woman with intention of disrobing her, wrongful restraint, and confinement.

== See also ==
- PTC Punjabi Film Awards
