= PTC Punjabi Film Awards =

Film awards

- Current: PTC Punjabi Film Awards 2020
- Awarded for: Best in Punjabi language film industry
- Country: India
- Presented by: PTC Punjabi
- First award: 2011
- Website: ptcpunjabifilmawards.in

PTC Punjabi Film Awards are Indian film awards presented annually by the PTC Punjabi television network to honour both artistic and technical excellence of professional filmmakers and actors in Punjabi cinema in India.

== History ==
The PTC Punjabi Film awards were first introduced in 2011. In 2020, Digital Film Awards were introduced. In the same year, due to coronavirus pandemic, the network announced the award show will be held online.

== PTC Punjabi Film Awards 2019 ==
In 2019 the awards were anchored by Sonu Sood, Divya Dutta, Manish Paul, Gavy Chahal and Gurnam Bhullar.They took place at JLPL Ground, Mohali on 16 March. Sajjan Singh Rangroot, Carry On Jatta 2 and Qismat were the top winners winning 4 awards each, followed by Laung Laachi with 3 awards.

== PTC Punjabi Film Awards 2020 ==
The World's first online awards show this year: PTC Punjabi Film Awards 2020. 2020 has not been a great year for the entertainment industry. COVID-19 forced lockdown across the globe and most events have been postponed indefinitely, if not cancelled. PTC Punjabi Film Awards 2020 therefore will go online. PTC Network is using technology to its best to make sure this event does not lack the glitz and glamour that it promises.

== Awards ==
As of 2014, there are 26 awards. There was a separate category of film-critics awards, decided by noted film critics rather than popular votes. This dual format has also generated some controversy amongst viewers and recipients. Awards were given in the following categories.

Merit Awards

- Best Movie
- Best Director
- Best Actor
- Best Actress
- Best Supporting Actor
- Best Supporting Actress
- Best Performance in a Negative Role
- Best Performance in a Comic Role
- Best Debut Director (Introduced in 2013)
- Best Male Debut
- Best Female Debut
- Best Music Director
- Best Lyricist
- Best Male Playback Singer
- Best Female Playback Singer

Critics Awards

- Critics Award For Best Movie
- Critics Award For Best Performance (Actor)
- Critics Award For Best Performance (Actress)
- Critics Award For Best Director

Technical Awards

- Best Cinematography
- Best Editing
- Best Story
- Best Screenplay & Dialogue
- Best Sound Recording
- Best Background Music

Special Awards

- Lifetime Achievement
- Icon of Punjab (2012)

== See also ==
- Cinema of India
