= Sukh Sanghera =

Indo-Canadian film and music video director

- Born: 18 February; Buzrag, Punjab, India
- Occupations: Film Director; Music Video Director; Cinematographer

Sukh Sanghera is an Indo-Canadian film and music video director associated with Punjabi-language films and music. He has directed over 300 Punjabi music videos. He has been nominated for various awards at PTC Punjabi Music Awards, winning one for his music video Diary sung by Amrinder Gill. In 2019, he directed Laiye Je Yaarian, for which he received PTC nomination for Best Debut Director.

== Early life and career ==
Sanghera hails from village Buzrag, Ludhiana, India. In 2007, he shifted to Canada and joined the trucking business. Before become director Sanghera has also modelled for more than 70 Punjabi songs. The first video he directed was for his friend and in an interview said, “I learned each and everything from YouTube.” In 2010, he founded an entertainment company 10+1 Creations Limited which has 11 members. As of 2019, he has directed over 300 music videos.

Sanghera started his film career in 2016 with the film Love Punjab, in which he served as line producer in Canadian schedule. Similarly in 2018, he served as Assistant Director and line producer in the film Ashke. In 2019, he made his directorial debut with the film Laiye Je Yaarian produced by Rhythm Boyz Entertainment.

Till now Sukh Sanghera has directed over 1000 videos and has worked with almost every Punjabi singers . He directed many videos of big artists such as Karan Aujla, Garry Sandhu, Amrinder Gill, Mankirt Aulakh, Gippy Grewal, Sidhu Moosewala, Babbu Maan etc. . He directs the videos mostly in Canada only .

In 2021, he announced his first film as writer named "Filma Wale" also directed by himself.

== Selected music videos ==
- Khat - Babbu Maan
- Samundar - Babbu Maan
- Pendu - Amrinder Gill
- Diary - Amrinder Gill
- Supna - Amrinder Gill
- Don't Worry - Karan Aujla
- Chitta Kurta - Karan Aujla
- Kya Baat Aa - Karan Aujla Ft. Tania
- Let Em Play - Karan Aujla
- Yaariyan Ch Fikk - Karan Aujla
- Rim V Jhanjhar- Karan Aujla
- Hair - Karan Aujla
- Ik Saal - Jassie Gill
- Gangland - Mankirt Aulakh
- Badnam - Mankirt Aulakh
- Kadar - Mankirt Aulakh
- Jail - Mankirat Aulakh
- Kamli - Mankirt Aulakh
- Khayal - Mankirt Aulakh
- Daang - Mankirt Aulakh
- Dard - Babbu Maan
- Banda Ban Ja - Garry Sandhu
- Door - Garry Sandhu
- Illegal Weapon - Garry Sandhu & Jasmine Sandlas
- Tareyan De Des - Prabh Gill
- Tankha - Ranjit Bawa
- Sohne Mukhde - Sharry Mann
- Kaali Camaro - Amrit Maan
- Guerilla War - Amrit Maan
- Aa Geya Ni Ohi Billo Time - Deep Jandu
- Good Life - Deep Jandu
- Rang Sanwla - Arsh Benipal
- Nose Pin - Jass Bajwa
- Diamond - Gurnam Bhullar
- Gangster Scene - Gursewak Dhillon
- Scratch - Gursewak Dhillon
- Kho Na Baithan - Kulwinder Billa
- Company - Gur Sidhu
- Manke - Jassa Dhillon
- Lowrider - Jassa Dhillon
- Majha Block - Prem Dhillon
- Above All - Jassa Dhillon, Gur Sidhu
- Raule - Jassa Dhillon
- Vaddi Galbaat - Gur Sidhu
- US - Sidhu Moose Wala
- Brown Shortie - Sidhu Moose Wala Ft . Sonam Bajwa
- G-Shit - Sidhu Moose Wala
- IDGAF - Sidhu Moose Wala Ft. Morrisson
- Power - Sidhu Moose Wala
- GOAT - Sidhu Moose Wala
- 2 Seater - Gippy Grewal
- Vigad Gaya - Gippy Grewal
- Stranger - Diljit Dosanjh
- Impress - Ranjit Bawa
- Uche Uche Kadd - Babbal Rai
- Kalla Changa - Ninja
- Rukh - Akhil
- Rang Gora - Akhil
- Double Cross - Ammy Virk
- Hassiyan Khediyan - Ammy Virk
- Kaali Hummer - Maninder Buttar
- Oh Kithe - Kamal Khan
- Main Tan Vi Pyaar Karda - Happy Raikoti Ft. Millind
- Taakre - Gur Sidhu ft. Jassa Dhillon
- Goli - Gur Sidhu

== Filmography ==
Year	Title	Credited as				Notes
Year	Title	Director	Assistant Director	Line Producer	Writer	Notes
2016	Love Punjab	No	No	Yes	No	
2018	Ashke	No	Yes	Yes	No	
2019	Laiye Je Yaarian	Yes	No	Yes	No	
2022	Fima Wale	Yes	No	Yes	Yes	

== Awards and nominations ==
Year	Song	Singer	Award Ceremony	Category	Result
2015	Diary	Amrinder Gill	PTC Punjabi Music Awards	Best Music Video	Won
2015	Diary	Amrinder Gill	PTC Punjabi Music Awards	Best Music Video Director	Nominated
2016	Oh Kitthe	Kamal Khan	PTC Punjabi Music Awards	Best Music Video Director	Nominated
2017	Main Tan Vi Pyar	Happy Raikoti	PTC Punjabi Music Awards	Best Music Video Director	Nominated

== See also ==
- Rahul Chahal
- Navi Lubana
