= Pinky Dhaliwal =

Indian film and music producer

- ਪਿੰਕੀ ਧਾਲੀਵਾਲ
- Born: Pushpinder Pal Singh Dhaliwal; April 15, 1973 (age 53); Dasaundha Singh Wala , Punjab , India
- Occupations: Film producer; Businessman
- Years active: 1991–present
- Organizations: Amar Audio; Mad4Music
- Notable work: Bibi Rajni (2024)

Pinky Dhaliwal (born Pushpinder Pal Singh Dhaliwal, 15 April 1973; Punjabi pronunciation: [ˈpɪ̃ːkiː d̪ʱaːliːʋaːl]; ਪਿੰਕੀ ਧਾਲੀਵਾਲ), is an Indian film and music producer associated with the Punjabi entertainment industry. He is the founder of production and distribution ventures including Amar Audio and Mad4Music.

== Early life and career ==
Dhaliwal was born in Punjab on 15 April 1973 and is based in Mohali, near Chandigarh. Dhaliwal entered the Punjabi entertainment business in the early 1990s, and was involved in regional music distribution. Later he established his own production and distribution labels, including Amar Audio and Mad4Music and has overseen the release of numerous Punjabi music singles and music videos. In 2024, Dhaliwal was credited as a producer on the Punjabi feature film Bibi Rajni, directed by Amar Hundal and starring Roopi Gill and Yograj Singh.

== Discography ==
Dhaliwal has produced multiple Punjabi music singles released under the Mad4Music, Amar Audio and other labels. Some of the notable tracks include:

Title	Artist	Year	Label	Source
Dil	Ninja	2016	Mad4Music	
Jaani Tera Naa	Sunanda Sharma	2017	Mad4Music	
Koke	Sunanda Sharma	2018	Mad4Music	
Patake	Sunanda Sharma	2018	Mad4Music	
Duji Vaar Pyar	Sunanda Sharma	2021	Mad4Music	
Pagal Nahi Hona	Sunanda Sharma	2021	Mad4Music	
Saza	Jyotica Tangri	2024	Mad4Music	

== Filmography ==
Year	Title	Role	Notes	Sources
2024	Bibi Rajni	Producer	Starring Roopi Gill and Yograj Singh	

== Legal issues and controversies ==
In March 2025, national media reported allegations by Punjabi singer Sunanda Sharma against Dhaliwal, including claims of financial exploitation and non-payment allegations; following the complaint, Dhaliwal was briefly detained by police. Following the initial complaint, media reports stated that additional Punjabi singers, including Shree Brar and Kaka, also filed police complaints against Dhaliwal, with the matters reported as being under inquiry at the time. Shortly thereafter, the Punjab and Haryana High Court ordered Dhaliwal's release and described aspects of the arrest as not in accordance with procedure; the court granted relief on terms reported in regional media.

In June 2025, media outlets reported an incident in which gunshots were fired outside Dhaliwal's residence in Mohali; police stated that one of the alleged shooters was arrested and that extortion was being investigated as a possible motive.
