= Pitaara TV =

Punjabi television movie channel

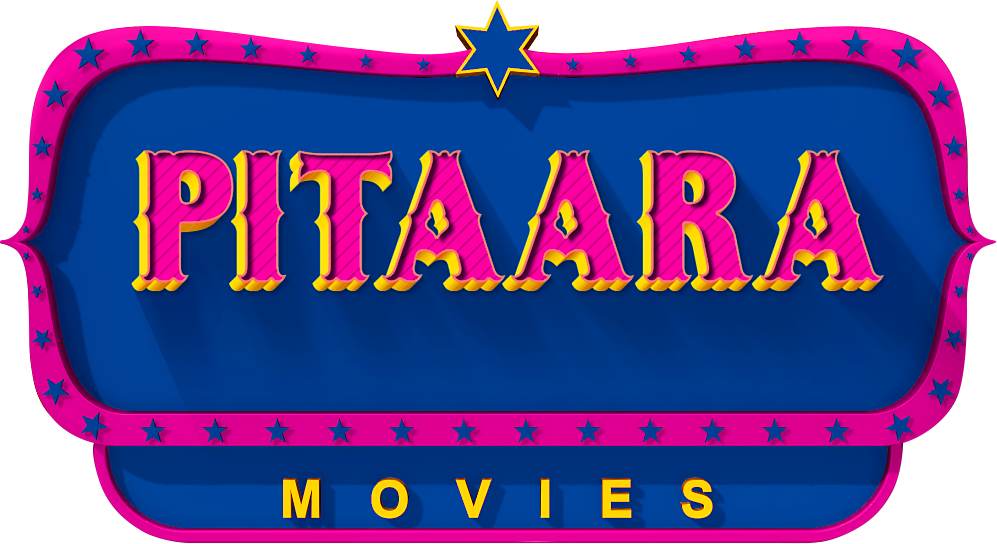
- Available in: Punjabi
- Headquarters: Chandigarh, Punjab, India
- Owner: Paul-E-Commerce Private Limited.
- Managing director: Sandeep Bansal
- Website: https://pitaara.tv/
- Launched: 26 March 2016
- Current status: Active

Pitaara TV, launched by Paul E-Commerce Pvt. Ltd, is a Punjabi movie channel. It aims to serve the expanding nationwide audience for Punjabi films and music by providing a dedicated platform for Punjabi cinema. It was started by managing director Sandeep Bansal. It later launched multiregional OTT platform Chaupal.

== Partnerships ==
Pitaara TV has significant collaborations with prominent organizations such as Xiaomi, Humble Motions, and Josh app
