= Gurpreet Singh Palheri =

Indian writer, line producer, and director

- Born: Palheri, Punjab, India
- Occupations: Writer, Line Producer, Director
- Years active: 2004–present
- Known for: Gyani ji
- Notable work: Sajjan Singh Rangroot, Nikka Zaildar 3, Sarpanchi
- Website: www.GurpreetSinghPalheri.com

Gurpreet Singh Palheri (born in Palheri village, Punjab) is an Indian writer, line producer, and director known for his work in Bollywood and the Punjabi film industry. He has made significant contributions as a writer and line producer and recently made his directorial debut with the web series Sarpanchi.

== Early life and education ==
Gurpreet Singh Palheri was born to a dairy farmer in Palheri village near Chandigarh, Punjab. He initially pursued a career in the merchant navy and obtained a diploma in welding. However, his career took a turn towards the film industry after meeting film producer Darshan Aulakh. Aulakh was scouting locations in Punjab for the film Veer-Zaara (2004) and sought Gurpreet's help in finding a suitable plot of land and convincing villagers to participate in the film. This pivotal moment marked the beginning of Gurpreet's long-standing association with the film industry.

== Career ==
=== Line producer ===
Films as Line Producer
Film	Year	Role
Yamla Pagla Deewana	2011	Line Producer
Son of Sardaar	2012	Line Producer
Yamla Pagla Deewana 2	2013	Line Producer
Jatt James Bond	2014	Line Producer
Punjab 1984	2014	Line Producer
Ghayal Once Again	2016	Line Producer
Ardaas	2016	Line Producer
Ambarsariya	2016	Line Producer
Manje Bistre	2017	Line Producer
Super Singh	2017	Line Producer

=== Writer ===
Films as Writer
Film	Year	Role
Dhan Guru Nanak	2016	Writer (Music Video)
Saab Bahadar	2017	Writer
Sajjan Singh Rangroot	2018	Writer
Aar Nanak Paar Nanak	2018	Writer
Nikka Zaildar 3	2019	Writer

=== Recent projects ===
Recent Projects
Project	Year	Role
Jodi	2023	Project Supervisor
Shukar Dattea	2016	Associate Director
Maurh	2023	Special Thanks
Laung Laachi	2018	Special Thanks
Gadar 2	2023	Team Member of Sunny Deol
Bambukat	2016	Project Design

=== Director ===
Gurpreet Singh Palheri made his directorial debut with the web series Sarpanchi, set to premiere on Chaupal from August 15. The series delves into the vibrant and tumultuous political landscape of Punjab's villages. It follows the journey of Bant, a young man played by Jass Bajwa, who navigates the complexities of Sarpanchi elections. Sarpanchi offers an unflinching look at the political dynamics and challenges of rural communities. The series has been shot in villages Rupalheri and Kheri Bir Singh, and other areas near Bassi Pathana in Punjab.

=== Cast ===
- Jass Bajwa as Bant Singh
- Sardar Sohi
- Kuljinder Singh Sidhu
- Gurinder Makhna
- Irwin Meet Kaur
- Manna Mand

=== Production ===
Sarpanchi has been filmed in several villages including Rupalheri and Kheri Bir Singh, as well as areas near Bassi Pathana, Punjab.

== Personal life ==
Gurpreet Singh is better known by his nickname "Gyaniji". He started his own company, Kisan Productions, in 2009. He has been associated with Diljit Dosanjh for several years and has made notable contributions to the Punjabi film industry.

== Notable works ==
=== Films ===
- Veer-Zaara (2004)
- Yaara Naal Bahara (2005)
- Kisaan (2009)
- Yamla Pagla Deewana (2011)
- Son of Sardaar (2012)
- Yamla Pagla Deewana 2 (2013)
- Punjab 1984 (2014)
- Jatt James Bond (2014)
- Ghayal Once Again (2016)
- Ardaas (2016)
- Ambarsariya (2016)
- Dhan Guru Nanak (2016) (Music Video)
- Saab Bahadar (2017)
- Manje Bistre (2017)
- Super Singh (2017)
- Sajjan Singh Rangroot (2018)
- Aar Nanak Paar Nanak (2018)
- Nikka Zaildar 3 (2019)
- Maurh (2023)
- Gadar 2 (2023)
- Jodi (2023)

=== Web series ===
- Sarpanchi (2024)
