= Sarpanchi =

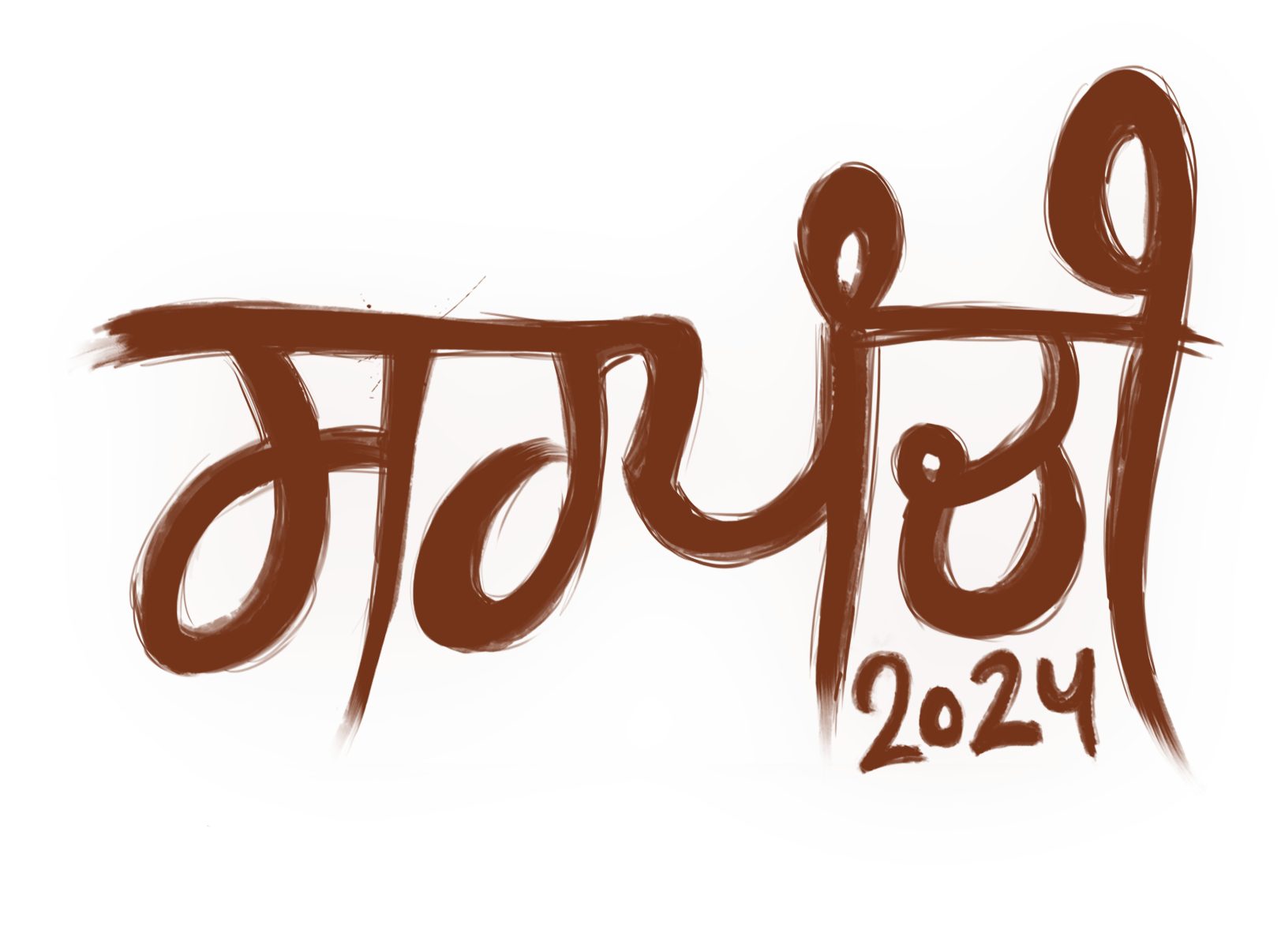
- Written by: Gurpreet Singh Palheri
- Screenplay by: Gurpreet Singh Palheri
- Story by: Gurpreet Singh Palheri
- Directed by: Gurpreet Singh Palheri
- Starring: Jass Bajwa, Kuljinder Singh Sidhu, Sardar Sohi, Gurinder Makna, Irwinmeet
- Country of origin: India
- Original language: Punjabi

Production
- Producer: Chaupal Studios

Original release
- Network: Chaupal

Sarpanchi is a Punjabi-language political drama web series that was released on 15 August 2024 on the OTT platform Chaupal. . The series is written and directed by Gurpreet Singh Palheri and features Jass Bajwa, Kuljinder Sidhu, Sardar Sohi, Gurinder Makna, and Irwinmeet.

== Plot ==
The series tells the story of a Punjabi family. The head of the family, an elder who was the first Sarpanch of the village after India's independence, advised his family to stay away from the position. However, in 2024, the villagers, recalling the elder's good deeds, insist that the family take up the role again.

Baant, the elder's grandson, initially plans to move abroad for a better future. However, when antagonist Makhaan insults his family, Baant feels compelled to defend their honor. He decides to run for the position of Sarpanch, facing significant opposition and numerous challenges. The series follows Baant's journey as he navigates political and personal obstacles to achieve his goal and uphold his family's legacy.

The series has themes of family honor, political rivalry, and community spirit.

== Cast ==
- Jass Bajwa as Baant: The protagonist, who stands for the Sarpanchi election to regain his family's respect.
- Kuljinder Sidhu as Makhaan: The antagonist and Baant's uncle.
- Sardar Sohi
- Gurinder Makna
- Irwinmeet as Ekam: Baant's fiancée.
- Jarnail Singh as Taali: A loyal servant of Mehar Singh who joins the opposition when denied a Panchayat seat.

== Production ==
The series is produced by Chaupal Studios with Ajayvir Singh as the project head. Music is composed by Gurmoh, Manna Singh, and Rafal, with lyrics by Gill Raunta, Vari Rai, and Saheb. Mukul Punia is the director of photography, and Parminder Virdi is the editor. The background score is composed by Manna Singh.

== Release ==
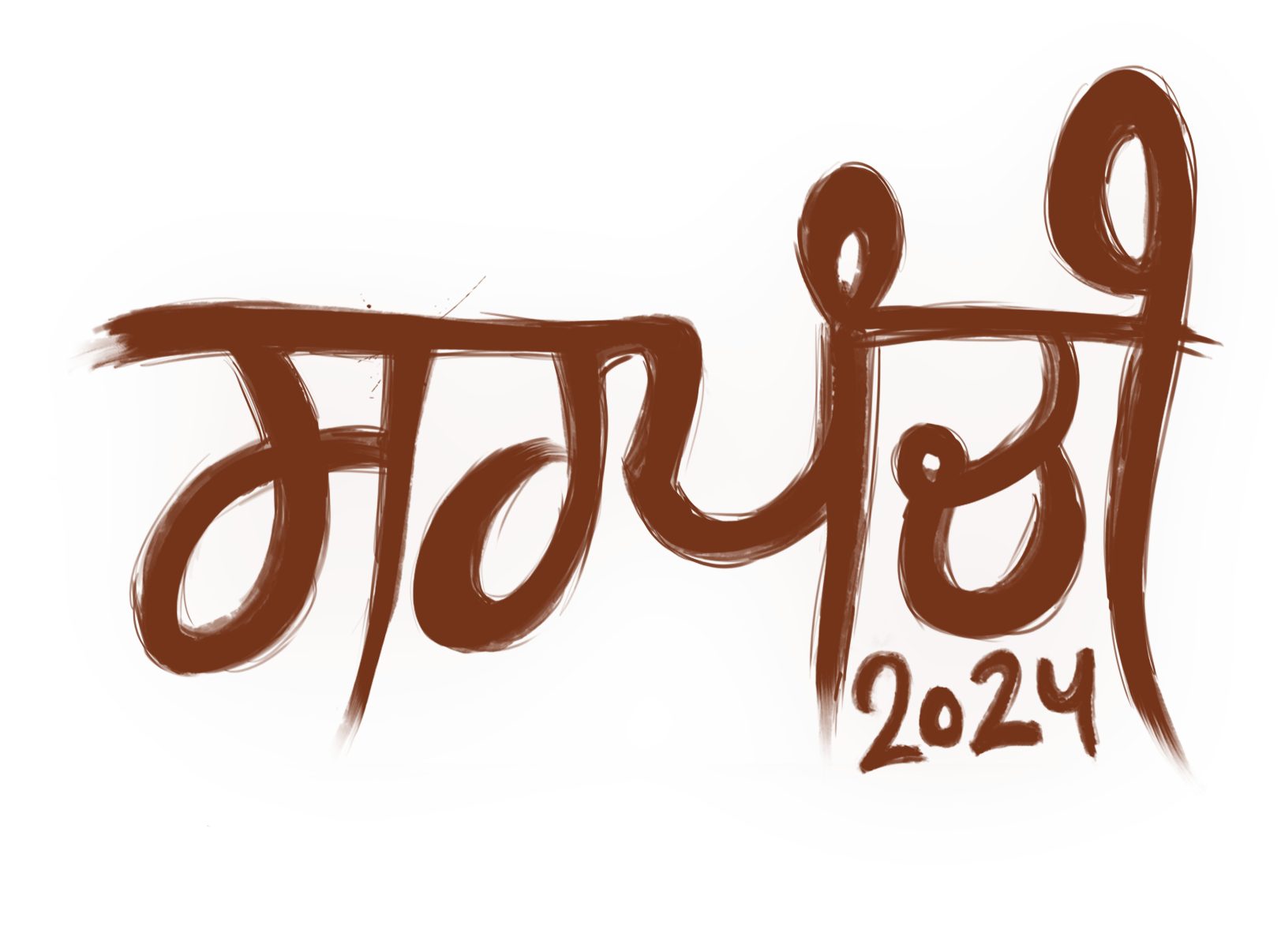
Punjabi Logo of Sarpanchi

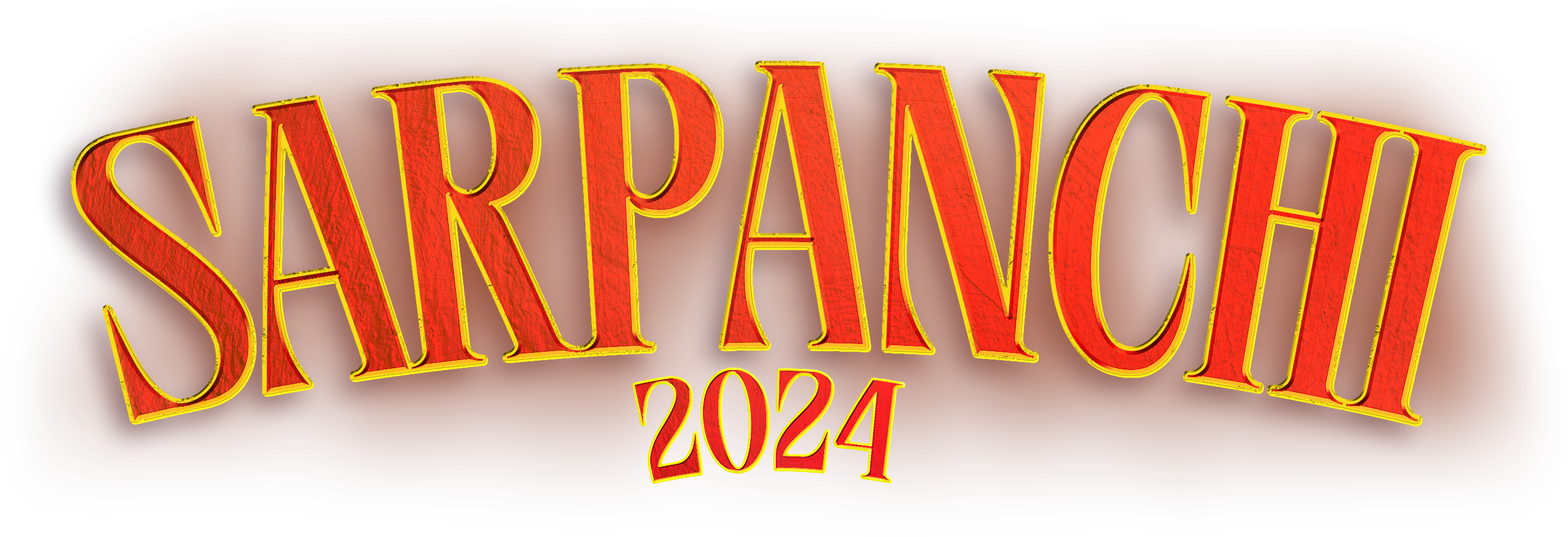
English Logo of Sarpanchi

The series is set to release on the OTT platform Chaupal on 15 August 2024.
