= Bibi Rajni =

2024 Indian Punjabi devotional movie about faith and believe in God

- Directed by: Amar Hundal
- Written by: Amar Hundal; Baldev Gill
- Screenplay by: Pankaj Batra; Gurpreet Singh Palheri; Gulshan Singh
- Starring: Roopi Gill; Yograj Singh; Pardeep Cheema; Jass Bajwa; Gurpreet Ghuggi; Sunita Dhir
- Release date: 30 August 2024
- Country: India
- Language: Punjabi

Bibi Rajni is a Punjabi film directed by Amar Hundal, starring Roopi Gill, Yograj Singh, Jass Bajwa, Gurpreet Ghuggi, and Sunita Dhir.

== Plot ==
The story of Bibi Rajni is of a devout Sikh during Guru Ram Das' era. Her father, angered that she believes in God, as a punishment, she was married to a leper. Despite the hardship she faced she accepted her fate without complaining. The story is of one woman's unwavering faith and trust in God despite facing many obstacles.

== Cast ==
- Roopi Gill
- Yograj Singh
- Jass Bajwa
- Gurpreet Ghuggi
- Baljinder Singh Darapuri

== Reception ==
The film earned ₹30.5 crore worldwide.
