= Roopi Gill =

Indian actress and model (born 1997)

- Gill in 2025
- Born: Roopinder Kaur Gill; 28 July 1997 (age 29)
- Occupations: Model; actress
- Years active: 2018–present
- Known for: Ashke
- Notable work: Laiye Je Yaarian

Roopinder Kaur Gill, better known as Roopi Gill, is an Indian model and actress who mostly works in Punjabi cinema. She rose to fame with her performance in the music video for the song "Diamond", by Gurnam Bhullar. She started her acting career with Ashke (2018), for which she received a PTC Punjabi Film Awards nomination for Best Supporting Actress. Also, she appeared in the music video of "Stranger" song by Diljit Dosanjh. She has frequently collaborated with Sukh Sanghera for music videos and films. In 2019, she appeared in Laiye Je Yaarian, for which she received PTC Critics Award for Best Actress.

== Career ==
Roopi Gill started her career, featuring in Karan Aujla's "Yaarian Ch Fikk" music video. Gill made her feature film debut with the film Ashke in 2018. The film was produced by Rhythm Boyz Entertainment and directed by Amberdeep Singh. She played role of a teacher called "Noor". Her performance was acclaimed by critics and audiences, and she was nominated for the "Best Supporting Actress" award at the PTC Punjabi Film Awards. She later starred in the 2018 film Vadda Kalakaar. In 2019, she appeared as a lead actress in Laiye Je Yaarian, her second collaboration with Rhythm Boyz and Amrinder Gill. Her performance in the film was praised by critics, and received a PTC nomination for Best Actress.

== Filmography ==
Key
†	Denotes films that have not yet been released

Year	Film	Role	Notes
2018	Ashke	Noor	Debut film
2018	Vadda Kalakaar	Malki	
2019	Laiye Je Yaarian	Raunaq/ RJ Ramzi	Released on 5 June 2019
2022	Maa Da Ladla	Binder	
2023	Parinda Paar Gaya	Jasmine Dhillon	
2024	Jatt Nuu Chudail Takri	Jeeti	
2024	Bibi Rajni	Bibi Rajni	
2025	Majhail	Basant kaur	
2026	Chardikala	Bibi Bimal Kaur Khalsa	

== Music videos ==
- "Dildariyan" - Raj Ranjodh
- "Stranger" - Diljit Dosanjh
- "Diamond" - Gurnam Bhullar
- "Jandi Jandi" - Seera Buttar
- "Rang Gora" - Akhil
- "Scratch" - Gursewak Dhillon
- "Kamli" - Mankirt Aulakh
- "Tareyaan De Des" - Prabh Gill
- "Yaarian Ch Fikk" - Karan Aujla
- "Majha Block" - Prem Dhillon
- "Judge"- Mankrit Aulakh
- "Mathi Mathi" - "Amrinder Gill"

== Awards and nominations ==
Year	Film	Award Ceremony	Category	Result
2019	Ashke	Brit Asia TV Film Awards	Best Debut Performance	Nominated
2019	Ashke	Brit Asia TV Film Awards	Best Supporting Actress	Nominated
2019	Ashke	PTC Punjabi Film Awards	Best Supporting Actress	Nominated
2020	Laiye Je Yaarian	PTC Punjabi Film Awards	Best Actress	Nominated
2020	Laiye Je Yaarian	PTC Punjabi Film Awards	Best Actress critics	Won
