= Laiye Je Yaarian =

2019 Indian Punjabi-language romantic drama film

- Theatrical release poster
- Directed by: Sukh Sanghera
- Written by: Dheeraj Rattan; Amberdeep Singh
- Screenplay by: Dheeraj Rattan; Manila Rattan
- Produced by: Rhythm Boyz Entertainment; Papilio Media
- Starring: Harish Verma; Roopi Gill; Rubina Bajwa; Amrinder Gill
- Cinematography: Sandeep Patil (India); Spiro Grant (Canada)
- Edited by: Sukh Sanghera
- Music by: Intense
- Production companies: Rhythm Boyz Entertainment; Papilio Media
- Distributed by: Omjee Group; Rhythm Boyz Entertainment
- Release date: 5 June 2019 (India)
- Running time: 117 minutes
- Country: India
- Language: Punjabi

Laiye Je Yaarian is a 2019 Indian Punjabi-language romantic drama film written by Dheeraj Rattan and directed by Sukh Sanghera. Co-produced by Rhythm Boyz Entertainment and Papilio Media; it stars Harish Verma, Roopi Gill, Rubina Bajwa, and Amrinder Gill in prominent roles. The film also has Kamaljeet Neeru, Parkash Gadhu, and Sajjan Adeeb in supporting roles; It marked the feature film directorial debut for Sanghera and Adeeb.

Laiye Je Yaarian was announced in August 2018. Story and screenplay of the film are written by Dheeraj Rattan while dialogues are penned by him and Amberdeep Singh. Principal photography of the film took place in two schedules between March 2019 and May 2019 at Punjab and Canada. Sanghera being a music video director paid a particular attention to the film's music. Dr Zeus, Snappy, Jatinder Shah, Intense, and Mix Singh composed the film's soundtrack, which features vocals from Gill, Garry Sandhu, Sajjan Adeeb, Maninder Buttar, and Raj Ranjodh.

Laiye Je Yaarian was released in India on 5 June 2019 and overseas on 7 June 2019. The film opened to mainly positive reviews. As of 16 June 2019, the film has grossed over ₹11 crore, becoming the ninth highest-grossing Punjabi film of 2019. At PTC Punjabi Film Awards 2020, it received six nominations, including Best Film, Best Actor (Amrinder Gill), and Best Actress (Roopi Gill).

== Premise ==
Raunak in transport business faced with a nemesis. In desperate moment she hires Sukh to help her but ends up with a cheat who has no intention of working for her and has his own vested interest. Jaanu becomes a collateral damage in the process and Sukh realises that he had the ability to do something in life and he had always underestimated himself. All of this for one man's attempt to shut down Raunak transport. But a twist that no one saw coming. Garry holds his cards close to his heart in matters of emotions and business. But one often meets their destiny on the road one avoids to take in the beginning.

== Cast ==
- Harish Verma as Sukhdeep Singh 'Sukh'
- Roopi Gill as Raunak
- Rubina Bajwa as Jaanpreet 'Jaanu'
- Amrinder Gill as Garry Randhawa
- Kamaljeet Neeru as Raunak's mother
- Parkash Gadhu as Sukh's father
- Amberdeep Singh as Binder
- Gurshabad (special appearance)
- Bunty Bains (special appearance)
- Sajjan Adeeb as Baldev (special appearance)
- Khushi Duggan as himself
- Shipra Goyal as herself (special appearance)
- Ranjit Bawa as himself (special appearance)
- Sukh Sanghera (special appearance)

== Soundtrack ==
Laiye Je Yaarian

Soundtrack album by Intense, Dr Zeus, Jatinder Shah, Snappy & Mix Singh
- Released: 14 June 2019
- Recorded: 2019
- Genre: Feature film soundtrack
- Length: 21:46
- Label: Rhythm Boyz
External audio
- Audio Jukebox on YouTube

Laiye Je Yaarian's soundtrack is composed by Dr Zeus, Snappy, Jatinder Shah, Intense and Mix Singh. Lyrics are penned by Harmanjeet, Bir Singh, Raj Ranjodh, Bling, Maninder Buttar, Rav Hanjra and Happy Parsowal while background score is composed by Intense.

=== Track List ===
| No. | Title | Lyrics | Music | Singer(s) | Length |
|---|---|---|---|---|---|
| 1. | "Darshan Mehnge" | Harmanjeet | Intense | Sajjan Adeeb; Amrinder Gill | 2:42 |
| 2. | "Aah Ki Hoya" | Raj Ranjodh | Intense | Raj Ranjodh | 3:17 |
| 3. | "Mathi Mathi" | Bir Singh | Dr Zeus | Amrinder Gill | 3:10 |
| 4. | "Meri Aakad" | Happy Parsowal | Intense | Garry Sandhu | 3:04 |
| 5. | "Dil Main Nahi Laona" | Bling Singh; Maninder Buttar | Mix Singh | Maninder Buttar | 2:15 |
| 6. | "U & I" | Rav Hanjra | Snappy | Garry Sandhu | 1:49 |
| 7. | "Kurti De Mor" | Harmanjeet | Jatinder Shah | Amrinder Gill | 2:54 |

== Production ==
Laiye Je Yaarian was announced a few weeks after the success of Golak Bugni Bank Te Batua. Dheeraj Rattan wrote the screenplay while dialogues were penned by him and Amberdeep Singh. In April 2019, it was revealed that the project is being directed by Sukh Sanghera, who has previously worked with Rhythm Boyz Entertainment in Love Punjab and Ashke as line producer and Assistant Director in Canadian schedules. It marked as directorial debut for Sanghera. Title of the film was taken from Amrinder Gill’s song "Yaarian" from album Judaa, released in 2011. Meanwhile, it was revealed by media that the film is titled as "Dila Mereya" but Harish Verma declined the rumours and said, "Dila Mereya was one of the titles that were being considered but it wasn't finalized". Gill in an interview with BBC disclosed that he is playing a "negative character" in the film, and is his first negative role.

Laiye Je Yaarian is majorly shot in Punjab, India and Canada. Principal photography of the film took place in two schedules, first schedule began on 14 December 2018 while second schedule began on 30 March 2019 at Ludhiana and was wrapped on 16 May 2019 at Abbotsford, British Columbia where Sandeep Patil served as cinematographer in India while Wes Miron, Spiro Grant, Samuel, and Sukh Sanghera in Canada. In an interview Verma disclosed that filming was postponed because of his busy schedule. The film was earlier slated to release on 8 February 2019. Background music of the film was composed by Intense while soundtrack was composed by Dr Zeus, Jatinder Shah, Snappy, and Intense. Sanghera being a Music Video director paid a particular attention on the film's music. The film was edited by Sukh Sanghera and its final cut ran for a total of 117 minutes and 13 seconds. Distribution rights were acquired by Omjee Group in India while Rhythm Boyz itself in overseas.

== Release and marketing ==
The film was originally scheduled to be released on 8 February 2019 and was announced along Bhajjo Veero Ve and Ashke 2 in August 2018. Amrinder Gill announced the film on his social media handles on his birthday 11 May 2019. The film was released on 5 June 2019 in India while on 7 June 2019 at overseas, and is distributed by Omjee Group in India and Rhythm Boyz Entertainment at overseas. In India, the film clashed Salman Khan’s Bollywood film Bharat. The film received "UA" certificate from CBFC in India.

The first look poster was released on 19 May 2019 along with title, in the poster Harish Verma and Roopi Gill are seen. Second poster of the film showing Amrinder Gill was released on 22 May 2019. First song from the film "Darshan Mehnge" sung by Amrinder Gill and Sajjan Adeeb was released on 23 May 2019. Official trailer of the film was released on 27 May 2019. Second song "Aah Ki Hoya" written and sung by Raj Ranjodh was released on 29 May 2019.

== Reception ==
=== Box office ===
As of 16 June 2019, Laiye Je Yaarian has grossed ₹2.58 crore in Canada, ₹1.06 crore in Australia, ₹42 lacs in United States, ₹22 lacs in New Zealand, and over ₹3 lacs in Europe.

=== Critical reception ===
Gurnaaz Kaur of The Tribune gave the film three and a half star out of five. She praised the film's cinematography, production work, and all the four leads while criticised Bajwa for being "out of character" sometimes. In last added, "With all its complications and confusions, the film mostly keeps you glued. Just, at times, you do wonder where it is all going. So many stories running parallel to each other is perhaps the film’s Achilles heel. One gets distracted and none of the story really gets justice as the slow-paced movie is suddenly rushed to a rather slack ending." Monita Sharma of IamPunjaabi gave four out of five stars and praised the concept of the film. She remarked, "Overall, Laiye Je Yaarian marks the beginning of new kind of Punjabi cinema away from the world of usual comedies, Punjabi cultural dramas and period flicks." Punjabi website DaahFilms gave three and a half stars out of five, described the film as "entertaining, well elaborated and perfectly shot" but criticised the Bajwa's performance and connections in between the characters in the end.
