= Chakvi Mandeer =

EP by Jass Bajwa
- Released: September 16, 2014
- Recorded: 2014
- Genre: Bhangra; Indian
- Length: 29:23
- Label: Panj-aab
- Producer: Harwinder Sidhu

Jass Bajwa chronology
Chakvi Mandeer (2014)	Jatt Sauda (2015)

Chakvi Mandeer is an album by Jass Bajwa. The album was composed by Gupz Sehra whereas lyrics for the album were penned by Jass Bajwa & Lally Mundi. The album was released on record label Panj-aab Records. The album also marks the debut of Jass Bajwa.

The album was released on 16 September 2014 on the record label Panj-aab Records. Jass Bajwa was also nominated for the Best Debut Award at the PTC Music Awards.

== Track listing ==
No.	Title	Lyrics	Music	Singer(s)	Length
1.	"21 Number"	Jass Bajwa	Gupz Sehra	Jass Bajwa	3:28
2.	"Catwalk"	Jass Bajwa	Gupz Sehra	Jass Bajwa	3:43
3.	"Chakvi Mandeer"	Jass Bajwa	Gupz Sehra	Jass Bajwa	3:14
4.	"Feeling"	Jass Bajwa	Gupz Sehra	Jass Bajwa	3:36
5.	"Feem Di Dali"	Jass Bajwa	Gupz Sehra	Jass Bajwa	3:21
6.	"Kismat"	Jass Bajwa	Gupz Sehra	Jass Bajwa	4:50
7.	"Tera Time"	Lally Mundi	Gupz Sehra	Jass Bajwa	3:49
8.	"Tolla"	Jass Bajwa	Gupz Sehra	Jass Bajwa	3:22
Total length:					29:23
