= Rahul Chahal =

- Born: 26 June 1986 (age 40); Canada
- Occupations: Music video director; cinematographer

Rahul Chahal is a Canadian music video director and music composer associated with Punjabi-language music videos. He is the owner of video-directing company "TDOT FILMS". He has directed over 100 videos and worked with artists such as Sidhu Moose Wala, Garry Sandhu, Jassie Gill, Prem Dhillon, Happy Raikoti, R-Nait, Gurj Sidhu, Sajjan Adeeb, Jazim Sharma and The Landers.

== Early life and career ==
Chahal hails from Toronto, Canada. He made his debut in 2015 with the song "Currency" by Akash Aujla. He has directed Sidhu Moose Wala's hits "Just Listen", "Doller" and "Jatt da muqabla", as well as "Red Battiyan" by R-Nait and "Heart Patient" by The Landers.
