= Chaupal (streaming service) =

Indian streaming service

- Website type: Over-the-top streaming service
- Available in: Punjabi, Haryanvi, Bhojpuri
- Owner: Bosna Digital Entertainment Pvt. Ltd.
- Managing director: Mr. Sandeep Bansal
- Website: https://www.chaupal.com/
- Commercial: Yes
- Registration: Optional
- Launched: August 2021
- Current status: Active

Chaupal is an Indian over-the-top (OTT) streaming service owned by Bosna Digital Entertainment Pvt Limited. Launched in August 2021, it offers content in Punjabi, Haryanvi, and Bhojpuri languages.

== Overview ==
Chaupal, traditionally a term for communal gathering spaces in South Asia, denotes an online entertainment platform in its contemporary usage. The platform features a range of movies and web series, emphasizing regional Indian languages such as Punjabi, Bhojpuri, and Haryanvi.

== History ==
Chaupal was established by the Punjabi movie channel Pitaara TV. The OTT provides entertainment content in three regional languages – Punjabi, Haryanvi, and Bhojpuri.

== Availability and access ==
=== Availability ===
The Platform's service is globally available. iOS users can access the app in all countries except France and China. Android and Android TV users can enjoy the platform in all countries except China. Amazon Fire device users can access the app worldwide. Samsung device users can access the app in all countries except Brazil and China.

=== Subscriptions ===
Chaupal provides a variety of subscription plans. These plans differ in terms of video resolution, the number of simultaneous streams permitted, and the number of devices that can be used for content downloads.

== Content ==
The content library of Chaupal includes movies, web series, and short films in Punjabi, Haryanvi, and Bhojpuri. On its launch day, The Platform released 12 originals (films and web series), 50 exclusive titles, and over 300 movies.

=== Original Movies ===
Title	Language	Genre	Ref
Please Kill Me	Punjabi/Bhojpuri	Mystery crime thriller	
Seep Haryanvi Link	Punjabi/Haryanvi	Political thriller	
Dustbin	Punjabi/Bhojpuri/Haryanvi	Suspense drama	
Umran Ch Ki Rakheya	Punjabi	Romantic drama	

=== Original Web Series ===
Title	Language	Genre	Ref
Shikaari 2	Punjabi	Crime drama	
Lanka Mein Danka	Bhojpuri	Action drama	
Prapanch	Bhojpuri	Action crime	
Pakadua Biyah	Bhojpuri	Crime and social drama	
Sarpanchi	Punjabi	Political drama	
84 Toh Baad	Punjabi	Periodic drama, Thriller	

== Partnerships ==
Chaupal has been added exclusively to Amazon Prime Video Channels in India and is available as an add-on with Zee5 Global for the USA audience. It has also formed partnerships with various platforms, including Airtel Xstream Play, Tata Binge Play, Watcho, Jio TV, OnePlus TV, and others.
