= Jatt Nuu Chudail Takri =

- Theatrical release poster
- Directed by: Vikas Vashisht
- Written by: Amberdeep Singh
- Produced by: Sargun Mehta; Ravi Dubey
- Starring: Gippy Grewal; Sargun Mehta; Roopi Gill
- Cinematography: Navneet Misser
- Edited by: Rohit Dhiman
- Music by: Avvy Sra
- Release date: 15 March 2024
- Country: India
- Language: Punjabi

Jatt Nuu Chudail Takri (transl. A Jatt Meets a Witch) is a 2024 Indian Punjabi-language horror-comedy film directed by Vikas Vashisht and written by Amberdeep Singh. It stars Gippy Grewal, Sargun Mehta and Roopi Gill, with Nirmal Rishi and B. N. Sharma in supporting roles. The film was released theatrically on 15 March 2024.

== Plot ==
Jalaludeen "Jallal", who frequently dismisses demanding wives as "chudails" (witches), convinces a friend to abandon his marriage during a trip with friends. He later marries Rani but grows suspicious that she may be supernatural. His doubts lead to a series of events that challenge his prejudices and force the group to reconsider their views on women and relationships.

== Cast and characters ==
- Gippy Grewal as Jalaludeen
- Sargun Mehta as Rani
- Roopi Gill as Jeeti
- Nirmal Rishi
- B. N. Sharma
- Ravinder Mand
- Amrit Amby
- Deedar Gill

== Production ==
Shooting started in April 2023. The film was released in Indian cinemas on 15 March 2024.

== Reception ==
=== Critical response ===
The Indian Express described the film as "entertaining but uneven," noting its attempt to balance social commentary with comedy, and rated it 3 out of 5. News Flash 18 praised the performances of Gippy Grewal and Sargun Mehta but pointed out tonal inconsistencies that at times undermined the impact. 5 Dariya News described the film as a "refreshing concept" with "stellar performances, captivating music, and impressive visual effects," though it also observed that the execution could have been more consistent.
