= Josh (app) =

Indian social media service

- Developer: VerSe Innovation Pvt. Ltd.
- Release: September 2020; 6 years ago
- Operating system: iOS; Android
- Size: 124.3 MB (iOS); Varies with device (Android)
- Available in: 12 languages
- List of languages: Hindi; Bengali; Bhojpuri; Gujarati; Kannada; Malayalam; Marathi; Odia; Punjabi; Tamil; Telugu; English
- Type: Social Media; Video sharing
- Licence: Freeware
- Website: myjosh.in

Josh (stylized as JOSH) was a video-sharing social networking service but it has since evolved into a live call and chat application owned by VerSe Innovation – an Indian technology company based in Bangalore, India. Josh was an Indian short video app that was launched in immediately after the Indian Government banned TikTok and other Chinese apps in June 2020. The founders of the platform have promoted the app as the “Instagram for Bharat” referring to their focus on the Indian audience that speaks its own regional and state languages. Josh was among the top 10 most downloaded apps social and entertainment apps in India of 2021 and had 150 million monthly active users as per April 2022.

The word 'Josh' translates to fervour or passion. The app was launched under the aegis of the Atmanirbhar Bharat campaign and to compete with the duopoly of Google and Facebook in India. Josh's parent company VerSe Innovations Pvt. Ltd. owns another startup Dailyhunt, which a content and news aggregator application. Both Dailyhunt and Josh are a part of the VerSe's focus on the "next billion" regional language users of India. Founders Virendra Gupta and Umang Bedi conceptualised Josh as a short-video platform that made content creation accessible to vernacular language users, essentially the non-English speaking audience in India.

== Features ==
Josh is currently available in 12 Indian languages and allows users to upload, share, remix bite-sized videos of up to 120 seconds. There are various categories across the video section including viral, trending, glamour, dance, devotion, yoga and cooking among others. Similar to Instagram and TikTok, it has a video feed which is curated for individuals on the basis of their app behaviour. The app hosts many daily, weekly and monthly social media challenges.

== Funding ==
In December 2020, within 3 months of its launch, Josh's parent app VerSe Innovation raised more than $100 million from investors including Alphabet Inc's Google and Microsoft. In February 2021, VerSe Innovation raised $100 million in Series H funding from Qatar Investment Authority, the sovereign wealth fund of the State of Qatar, and Glade Brook Capital Partners. In August 2021, VerSe raised over $450 million in its Series I financing round with a valuation of $1 billion. Investors included Canada Pension Plan Investment Board (CPPIB), Siguler Guff, Baillie Gifford, Carlyle Asia Partners Growth II affiliates, and others. The startup announced its plan to expand overseas and broaden its ecommerce play for both Dailyhunt and Josh. In April 2022, VerSe announced that it has raised $805 million in funding from investors at a valuation of nearly $5 billion. ByteDance Offloads Stake In Josh Parent VerSe, Exits At 56% Discount

== Partnerships ==
In February 2021, Saregama and Josh signed a music licensing deal, wherein Josh expanded its musical library with 1.3 lakh songs from Saregama in 25 different languages.

To improve their user experience, Josh partnered with computer vision company D-ID in August 2021. The company helped Josh introduce photo-to-video features, live portrait technology, animate their photos etc.

In order to solidify their efforts in enhancing Josh, VerSe acquired Indian social networking platform GolBol in October 2021. The move came as an effort by the startup to strengthen their discovery initiatives on the platform and classify content at scale and understand the core behaviour of Indian regional audiences.

Josh has also announced its plans to include live commerce as a potential revenue stream through its partnership with multiple large e-commerce players.

== Notable campaigns ==
- Say No To Dowry – In association with Josh, the Kerala Police partook in the #SayNo2Dowry online social media campaign that was started to highlight and stop the social evil in the state.
- Salute India – Josh entered the Guinness World Records by creating the largest online video album of people saluting (29,529). It organised an online campaign #SaluteIndia on the app during the 75th Independence Day of India during 10–15 August 2021.

== See also ==
- Dailyhunt
- Roposo
- Likee
- Koo
- TikTok
- Triller
