= Sunanda Sharma =

Indian singer and actress (born 1992)

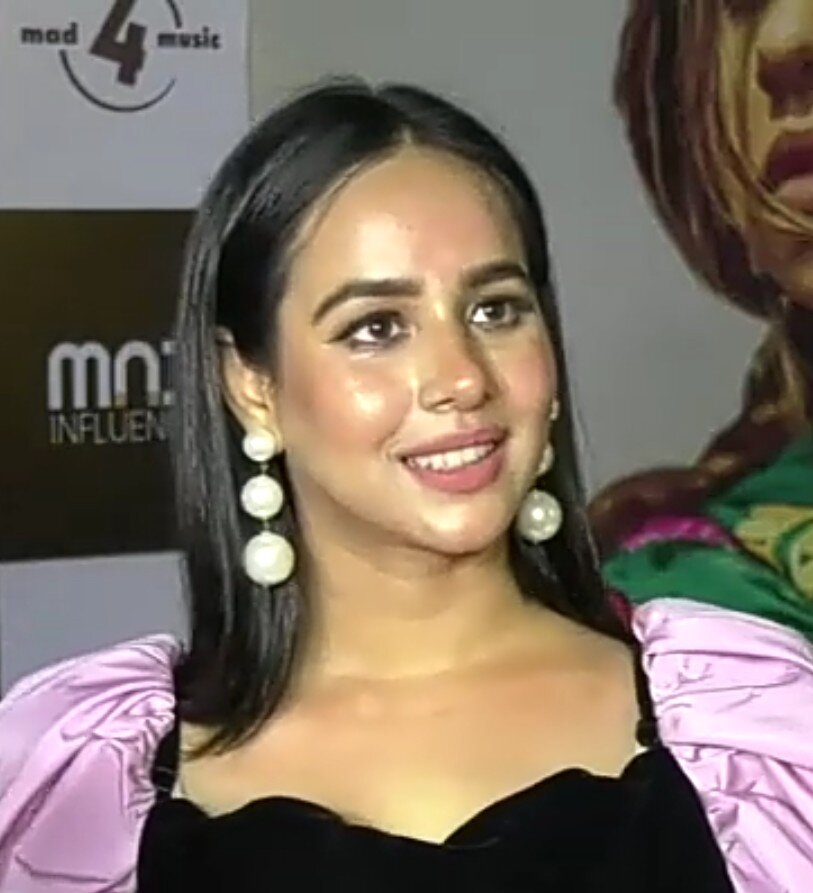
- Sharma in 2019
- Born: 30 January 1992 (age 34); Fatehgarh Churian, Punjab, India
- Citizenship: Indian
- Occupations: Singer; actor
- Notable work: Patake (song), Morni, Sandal, Jaani Tera Naa, Duji Vaar Pyar, Pagal Nahi Hona, Baarish ki jaye
- Musical career
- Label: Mad 4 Music

Sunanda Sharma (born 30 January 1992) is an Indian singer and film actress. She made her debut with the song "Billi Akh". Sharma began her acting career with the film Sajjan Singh Rangroot with co-stars Diljit Dosanjh and Yograj Singh. Sunanda started her Bollywood career with "Tere Naal Nachna" song.

== Career ==
Sunanda Sharma started her career by singing cover songs and uploading video recordings to YouTube. After growing in popularity, she eventually released her debut single, "Billi Akh". One of her songs “Jaani Tera Naa”, released in 2017, has been viewed over 334 million times on YouTube.

She won Best Debut Female Vocalist at PTC Punjabi Music Awards. In 2017 she won Best Female Act at the Brit Asia TV Music Awards. "Baarish Ki Jaaye" is being loved by audience around India. Sunanda Sharma was invited to host as an anchor for the show 'Hunar Punjab Da - Season 2', Telecasted on PTC Punjabi Channel. Sunanda Sharma is being known as the New Boss Lady of the Music Industry of India. Sunanda Sharma has made her debut at the prestigious Cannes film festival 2024. She was seen wearing a red suit with golden threadwork. In 2025, singer Sunanda Sharma became the subject of media attention following a legal dispute with Mad4Music founder Pinky Dhaliwal, as reported by Mint.

== Discography ==
=== Songs ===
Year	Title	Music	Lyrics	Ref.	Notes
2016	"Billi Akh"	Gag Studioz	Davinder Gunti		Debut
2016	"Patake"	Gag Studioz	Sangdil 47		
2017	"Jatt Yamla"	Maninder Kailey			
2017	"Jaani Tera Naa"	Sukh E Musical Doctorz	Jaani		
2017	"Koke"	Gag Studioz	Sangdil 47		
2018	"Morni"	Sukh E Musical Doctorz	Jaani		
2019	"Sandal"	Sukh E Musical Doctorz	Jaani		
2019	"Ban"	Archie	Sultan		
2019	"Nanki Da Veer"	Beat Minister	Veet Baljit		
2019	"Duji Vaar Pyar"	Sukh E Musical Doctorz	Jaani		
2021	"Pagal Nahi Hona"	Avvy Sra	Jaani		ft. Sonu Sood
2021	"Chorri Chorri"	Avvy Sra	Jaani		
2022	"Saadi Yaad"	Jaani			
2022	"9-9 Mashukan"	Jaani			
2023	"Jatt Disda"	N Vee	Kaptaan		ft. Dev Kharoud
2023	Udh Di Phiran	Bilal Saeed			
2024	Chandigarh Ka Chokra	Guri Nimana	Raj Ranjodh	Yaas Rani	By Ghaffar
2024	Parlour Te	Jatinder Shah	Chandra Brar		gronline.shop
2024	Narayani Namastute - Durga Stuti	Durga Stuti	gronline.shop		Devotional
2024	Lipstick Bindiyan	Jatinder Shah		By Ghaffar	

=== Films ===
Year	Film	Title	Music	Lyrics	Co-singer(s)	Refs	Notes
2018	Nawabzaade	Tere Naal Nachna	Badshah				
2018	Sajjan Singh Rangroot	Pankaj Batra	By Ghaffar				Debut film
2019	Luka Chuppi	"Poster Lagwa Do"	White Noise		Mika Singh, Nikhita Gandhi (Rap)		
2020	Jai Mummy Di	"Mummy Nu Pasand"	Tanishk Bagchi (original by Sukh E Musical Doctorz)	Jaani		Recreated from "Jaani Tera Naa"	
2024	Mittran Da Challeya Truck Ni	Mittran Da Challeya Truck Ni	Nilesh Dahanukar		Gr Pro	Add By Ghaffar	

== Filmography ==
=== Music videos ===
Year	Title	Singer(s)	Lyrics	Music	Notes	Ref.
2021	"Baarish Ki Jaaye"	B Praak	Jaani	B Praak	with Nawazuddin Siddiqui; acting role only	
2025	"Boyfriend"	Karan Aujla		Karan Aujla, Ikky	acting role only	
