= OnePlus TV =

Television lineup by OnePlus

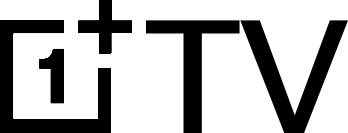
- Owner: OnePlus
- Type: LED, QLED
- Retail availability: 2019-present
- Operating System: Android TV OS (2019-present)
- Markets: India
- Screen sizes: 32, 40, 43, 50, 55 and 65 inches
- Resolution: HD-Ready, HD, UHD 4K
- Slogan/Motto: Imagination & Intelligence
- Product Manager: Todd Wang
- Manufacturers: TPV Display Technology; Dixon Technologies; Skyworth

OnePlus TV is a brand of television manufactured by the Chinese consumer electronics company OnePlus. The OnePlus TV division is headed by the company CEO Pete Lau and TV Product Manager Todd Wang.

== History ==
In September 2018, the company confirmed its plans to venture into the smart TV market with the OnePlus TV.

OnePlus launched the OnePlus TV Q1 on 26 September 2019, and since then, the company has launched five different series of TV in India.

== Products ==
=== OnePlus TV Q1/Q1 Pro ===
Launched on 26 September 2019

The first OnePlus TV series, the OnePlus TV Q1 and Q1 Pro, was launched on 26 September 2019 along with the OnePlus 7T.

==== Hardware ====
Both variants of the OnePlus TV feature 55-inch 4K-resolution QLED panels, with largely the same specifications. The only difference between the OnePlus TV Q1 and Q1 Pro is the presence of a built-in motorized soundbar on the more expensive unit. The 50W soundbar has eight front-firing speaker drivers – two woofers, four full-range drivers, and three tweeters. The OnePlus TV Q1 also has a rated sound output of 50W, but without the soundbar speaker. Both TVs have color gamut of NTSC 120%, dual band Wi-Fi and Bluetooth 5.0.

==== Software ====
Both televisions run Android TV 9 OS. The televisions also support Dolby Vision and sound formats up to Dolby Atmos, along with support for the HDR10 high dynamic range format. The OnePlus TV range has the Gamma Magic Colour picture processor, which is said to enhance picture quality.

==== Reception ====
The OnePlus TV Q1 and Q1 Pro received positive reception overall with praise directed at 4K-HDR, display brightness, design, and sound quality. The lack of mute button on the remote (which led to release of a free rebuilt remote) and no Netflix support during launch received negative reviews. The price difference between Q1 and Q1 Pro was also criticized by Prasad from GSMArena.com.

=== OnePlus TV Y1 ===
Launched on 2 July 2020

The OnePlus TV 43Y1 and 32Y1 were launched on 2 July 2020, and OnePlus TV 40Y1 was launched on 24 May 2021.

==== Hardware ====
The 43-inch and 40-inch variant come with full HD panels, while the 32-inch variant comes equipped with an HD-ready display. For the 43-inch and 40-inch variant, OnePlus has used a sturdy metallic frame to hold together the screen, the motherboard and other hardware. The TV offers a screen-to-body ratio of more than 90 percent. On the other hand, the 32-inch variant features a slightly lower screen-to-body ratio at 88 percent with a similar bezel-less design. All the Y1 TVs have a two-channel 20W speaker with color gamut DCI-P3 93%, 2.4 GHz Wi-Fi support, and Bluetooth 5.0.

==== Software ====
The three TVs run Android TV OS 9 and are powered by the company's gamma processing engine similar to the gamma engine in OnePlus Q1 series TVs—which performs real-time image quality optimizations for better picture quality. It also brings features such as adaptive contrast, random noise reduction, and ultra-smooth motion. With the new Y series, OnePlus has also introduced other features that reduce blur and ghosting.

==== Reception ====
The OnePlus Y1 TVs received a positive reception overall, with praises directed towards the sound quality, affordability and price-to-performance ratio.

The 32-inch model went on sale for the first time on 5 July 2020, selling out in just a minute, which was disclosed by the company via a tweet from its official Twitter handle.

=== OnePlus TV U1 ===
Launched on 2 July 2020

The new OnePlus televisions targeted the affordable segment of the TV market in India. The 2 July 2020 launch included the OnePlus U1, which features a 55-inch display with 4K resolution.

==== Hardware ====
The OnePlus 55U1's display panel features 93 percent DCI-P3 color gamut coverage, HDR10 support, and Dolby Vision and Hybrid Log Gamma support. A gamma engine was also added, which OnePlus has said will enable nine different picture modes on the TV. In terms of the design, the 55U1 comes with 95 percent screen to body ratio, and the body of the TV measures 6.9mm. It has four speakers placed at 90-degree angles to the frame, with 30W audio output.

==== Software ====
The TV comes with Dolby Atmos support and runs on OnePlus' custom Oxygen Play UI, which is based on Google's Android TV 9 OS – the same firmware that runs on the OnePlus Q1 series TVs.

==== Reception ====
The OnePlus TV U1 received a mixed reception, with praises directed towards affordability, picture quality and design; however, the inconsistent sound quality and frequent unavailability of product elicited a more negative response.

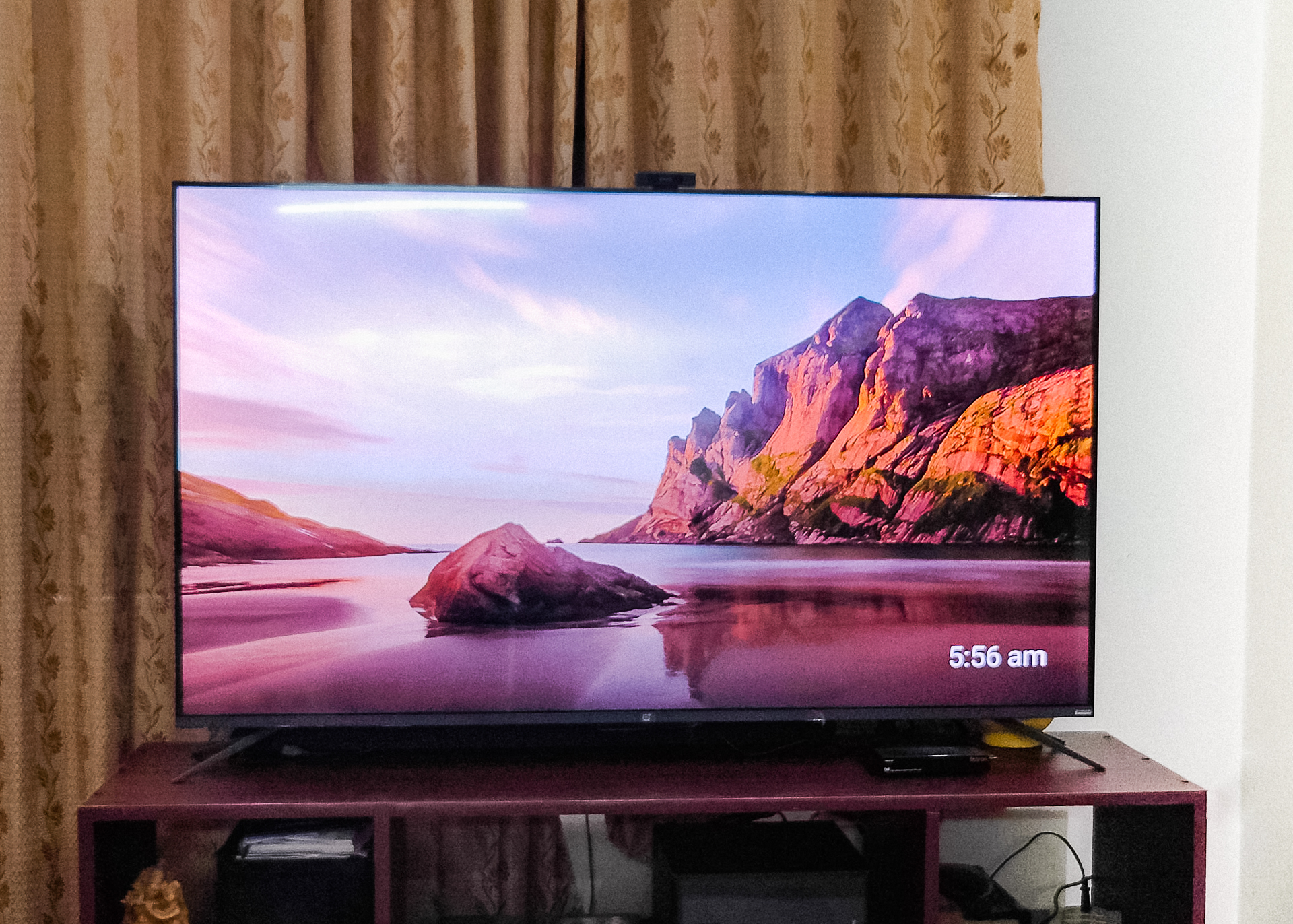
OnePlus TV U1S (launched on June 10, 2021)

=== OnePlus TV U1S ===
Launched on 10 June 2021

OnePlus launched another TV range called OnePlus TV U1S on 10 June 2021.

==== Hardware ====
The U1S 4K smart TV series was introduced in three sizes: 50 inches, 55 inches and 65 inches.

The OnePlus TV U1S series has HDR10+, HLG, and MEMC support as well. The televisions have slim bezels and come with 30W speakers with support for Dolby Audio co-tuned with Dynaudio, which they claim provides a better audio experience.

==== Software ====
The U1S runs on the Android TV 10 platform with built-in apps for Netflix, Prime Video, and Spotify. Google Assistant, Chromecast, Miracast, DLNA, and multicast are built in. For running applications, the U1S features 16GB internal storage with 2GB of system memory.

For connectivity, the OnePlus TV U1S features 3x HDMI 2.1 connectors (with HDMI 1 having eARC) along with a single optical audio output, analog AV input, Ethernet, dual-band Wi-Fi 802.11n, and 2x USB 2.0 ports.

==== Reception ====
Being the first OnePlus TV to have a 65-inch variant, the U1S series received a positive reception with praises directed towards build quality, design and colour reproduction. MEMC, AI picture quality, and color space mapping were highlighted. The lack of Dolby Vision and comparatively high price received a negative response.

=== OnePlus TV Y1S/Y1S Edge ===
Launched on 17 February 2021

OnePlus launched the Y1S TV range in its 'Double Feature Launch Event' which took place on YouTube on 17 June 2021. The TVs come in 32 inches and 43 inches and have an offline-specific Y1S Edge variant.

==== Hardware ====
The OnePlus TV Y1S and Y1S Edge feature a bezel-less display design, with the Edge having a metallic coating on the bottom bezel. The two models are both available in two sizes – 43 inches (with Full HD) and 32 inches (with HD resolution). Both TVs have support for HDR10+, HDR10, and HLG format support for a superior viewing experience.

The Y1S Edge series comes with a 24W speaker instead of 20W on the OnePlus TV Y1S. The rest of the specs are similar to the Y1S series. This offline-specific duo also comes with TÜV Rhineland Certification, which is not available on the regular Y1S variants. The company claims that their new x64-based processor provides 30% improvement over the previous Y1 series.

==== Software ====
The TVs come with HDR10+, HDR10, and HLG format support. All the Y1S series devices run Google's Android TV 11 OS and come with Dolby Audio support and an auto low-latency mode (ALLM). They come with a game mode that activates ALLM, which the company claims will provide an immersive experience. Connectivity options include dual-band Wi-Fi with 5 GHz and 2.4 GHz band support and Bluetooth support. The Y1S and Y1S Edge will also allow users to cast their smartphones with the help of the Smart Casting feature and support Chromecast and Miracast. They are also DLNA-certified. The TVs come with Kids Mode, Eye Comfort Mode and digital well being along with a companion app called OnePlus Connect App.

== OnePlus TV accessories ==
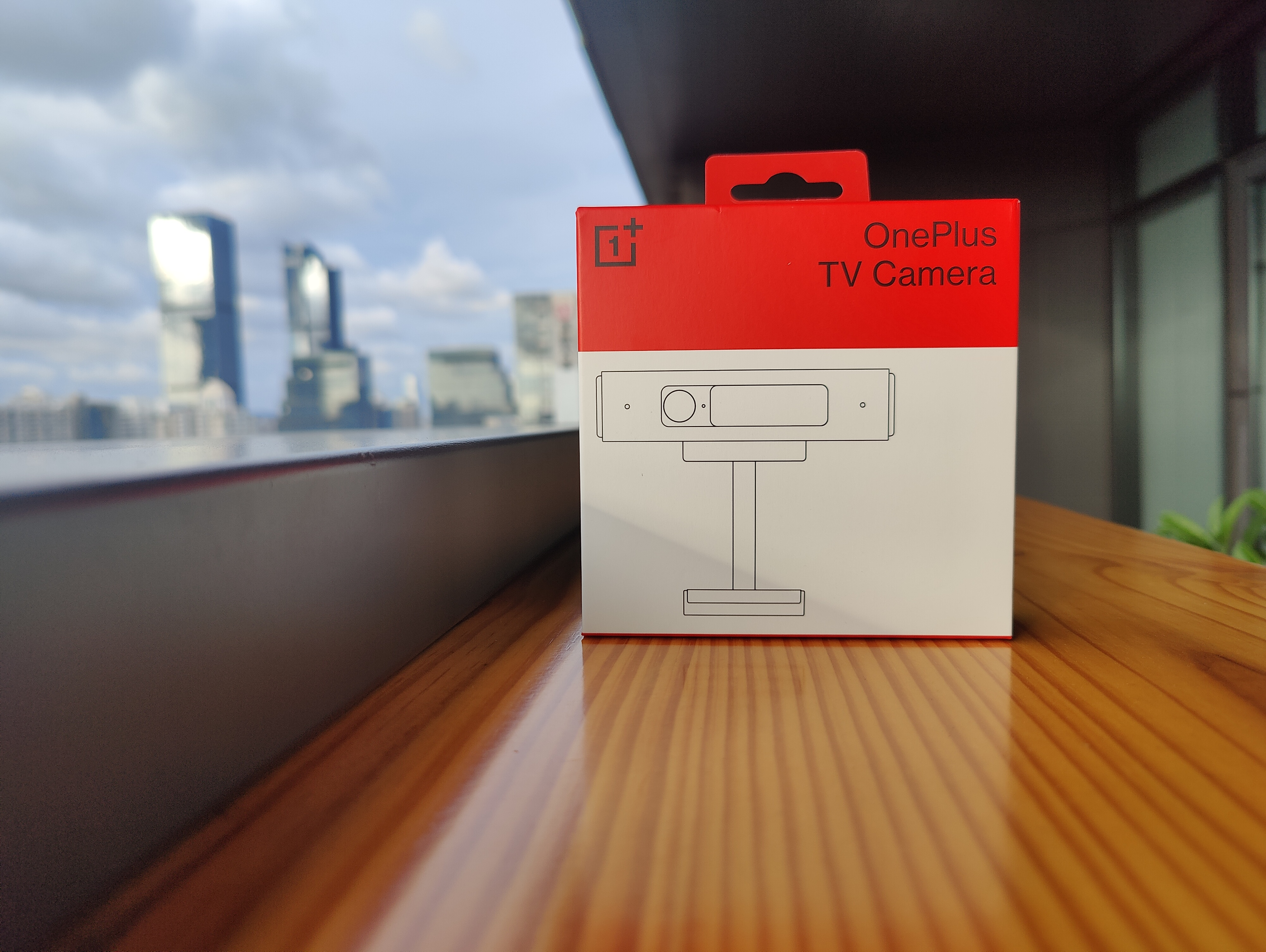
OnePlus TV Camera, launched alongside the U1S series on 10 June 2021

=== OnePlus TV Base Dock ===
The OnePlus TV Q1 did not come with a table-top stand included; only the Q1 Pro had it included in the box. Users buying the Q1 variant only have a wall mount included in the box, which is sold separately as an accessory on Amazon under the name of OnePlus TV Table-top Stand (Base Dock). This action of the company was criticized after the launch of Q1 TV.

=== OnePlus TV Netflix Remote ===
After receiving criticism on the OnePlus TV Q1's remote, OnePlus launched a free Netflix remote for existing customers. The Q1 TV did not support the Netflix app for several months after launch since Netflix required TV manufacturers to include a dedicated Netflix button on the remote. The OnePlus TV Netflix remote was launched after the company noticed users' feedback and Netflix's policy. The new remote has a different design and layout and a dedicated Netflix button.

=== OnePlus TV USB Camera ===
The OnePlus TV USB Camera was a plug-and-play camera launched along with the OnePlus TV U1S. It has Full HD resolution with support for video calling via Google Duo merged with Google Meet on the OnePlus TVs, two noise-cancellation microphones and a physical privacy shutter and indicator LED light. It has a magnetic holder for docking it on the TVs.

== OnePlus Connect app ==
The OnePlus Connect app is a companion app for OnePlus TVs. It allows users to search, explore and play content from their Android/iOS phones directly to their TVs, use their phones as a remote control/trackpad, quickly switch between frequent apps, cast local media or the device screen to TV, and take screenshots of the TV screen.

In July 2021, the company launched a new version of the app, OnePlus Connect 2.0. It added new functionalities like Smart Volume Control, which can automatically reduce the volume of the TV during incoming calls and return to the previous volume after the call ends. With the help of the TypeSync feature, users can type or speak directly into the phone to control the TV without a traditional remote. Via the Connect app, users can manage the Kids Mode remotely, set a timer to automatically turn the TV off, view user metrics to monitor screen time, use One Click Cleanup to stop running background apps, and transfer video and files from phone to TV without the need for an external application.

Anmol Sachdeva from Beebom.com stated the OnePlus Connect app was the best feature of OnePlus TVs.

== Comparison table ==
The following is a comparison list of all TVs belonging to the OnePlus brand of devices, all using the Android TV operating system.

Model		OnePlus 43Y1S/ 43Y1S Edge	OnePlus TV 32Y1S/ 32Y1S Edge	OnePlus U1S	OnePlus U1	OnePlus Q1 and Q1 Pro	OnePlus 43/40Y1	OnePlus 32Y1
Status		Current			Discontinued	Current		
Display	Type	LED				QLED	LED	
Display	Screen Size (inches)	43	32	50, 55 and 65	55	55	43/40	32
Display	Resolution	FHD (1920 x 1080)	HD Ready (1366 x 768)	4K (3840 x 2160)	4K (3840 x 2160)	4K (3840 x 2160)	FHD (1920 x 1080)	HD Ready (1366 x 768)
Display	HDR and Display Capabilities	HDR10+ Decoding, HDR10, HLG, TÜV Rheinland Certification (Y1S Edge only)		HDR10+, HDR10, HLG	DOLBY VISION, HDR10, HDR10+, HLG	DOLBY VISION, HDR10, HDR10+, HLG	None	
Display	Colour Gamut	-		Delta E<2, DCI-P3 93%	DCI-P3 93%	NTSC 120%	DCI-P3 93%	
Sound	Output	20W (Y1S)/24W (Y1S Edge)		30W	30W	50W	20W	
Sound	Speaker Type	2.0CH				2.1 CH	2.0 CH	
Sound	Configuration	2 Units		4 Units (65U1S)/2 Units (50U1S and 55U1S)	4 Units	8 Units (Q1 Pro)/4 Units (Q1)	2 Units	
Sound	Speaker Features	Dolby Audio		Dolby Audio, Co-Tuned with Dynaudio	Dolby Atmos, Dolby Audio, DTS-HD	Dolby Atmos, Dolby Digital Plus, Dolby Audio, DTS-HD	Dolby Audio	
Software Features	Operating System	Android TV 11		Android TV 10	Android TV 9	Android TV 9	Android TV 9	
Software Features	Pre-Loaded Apps	OxygenPlay, Prime Video, Netflix, YouTube, Hotstar, Google Play Store, Bluetooth Stereo, Smart Manager etc.		OxygenPlay, YouTube, Prime Video, Netflix, Spotify, Google Play Store, Bluetooth Stereo, File Browser, Weather, OnePlus Pictorial, Camera	OxygenPlay, Netflix, Prime Video, YouTube, Google Play Movies, Hotstar, ErosNow, Zee5, Hungama, SonyLiv, OnePlus Pictorial, Camera, Weather, File Browser	OxygenPlay, Netflix, Prime Video, YouTube, Google Play Movies, Hotstar, ErosNow, Zee5, Hungama, SonyLiv, OnePlus Pictorial, Camera, Weather, File Browser	Prime Video, Netflix, YouTube, Google Play Store, OnePlus Pictorial, Weather, File Browser	
Software Features	Voice Control	Google Assistant built-in; Works with Alexa		Google Assistant built-in; Works with Alexa, Farfield Voice Control Hands-free voice control with Speak Now™	Google Assistant built-in; Works with Alexa	Google Assistant built-in; Works with Alexa	Google Assistant built-in; Works with Alexa	
Connectivity	Casting	Chromecast built-in, DLNA, Miracast		Chromecast built-in, Miracast, DLNA, MultiCast	Chromecast built-in, DLNA, MultiCast	Chromecast built-in, DLNA, MultiCast	Chromecast built-in	
Connectivity	Wi-Fi	2.4 GHz/5 GHz 802.11 a/b/g/n		2.4 GHz/5 GHz 802.11 a/b/g/n		2.4 GHz/5 GHz 802.11 a/b/g/n/ac	2.4 GHz 802.11 b/g/n	
Connectivity	Bluetooth	BT 5.0				BT 5.0 BLE	BT 5.0	
Connectivity	Ethernet	1 (RJ45)						
Connectivity	RF Connection	1 (DVB-T2, ATV)		1 (DVB-T2, DVB-C, ATV)	1			
Connectivity	HDMI	2 HDMI 2.0 (out of which HDMI 1 with ARC)		3 HDMI 2.1 Compatible (out of which 1 is compatible with eARC)	3, out of which 1 supports ARC	4, out of which 1 supports ARC	2	
Connectivity	AV Input	1 (Mini 3 in 1)					1 (RCA)	
Connectivity	Digital Audio Output	1 (OPTICAL)						
Connectivity	USB Port	2 USB 2.0			2 (1 USB2.0, 1 USB3.0)	3 (1 USB2.0, 1 USB3.0, 1 USB Type-C)	2 (USB2.0)	
In the box/accessories	In The Box	1N Remote, 1N Power Cord, 1N User's Manual, 1N Warranty Card, 2N Stand Base, 2N Battery, 1N AV In Adapter		1N Remote, 1N AC Power Cord, 1N AV In Adapter, 1N Stand, 1N Wall-Mount,1N User Manual, 1N Warranty Card	1N Remote, 1N User's Manual, 1N Power Cord, 1N AV in Adaptor, 1N Warranty Card, 2N Stand Base, 2N Battery	1N Remote, 1N User's manual, 1N Power Cord, 1N AV in Adaptor, 1N USB Type-C Cable, 1N Table-Top Stand (Q1 Pro only) 1N Wall-Mount bracket(Q1 only), 1N Warranty Card	1N Remote, 1N User's Manual, 1N Power Cord, 1N Warranty Card, 2N Stand Base, 2N Battery, 1N AV in Adaptor	
In the box/accessories	Remote	-		RC-004D	RC-003A	RC-001A	RC-002B	
References								

== See also ==
- OnePlus
- Android TV
