= Navi Lubana =

Indian music video director

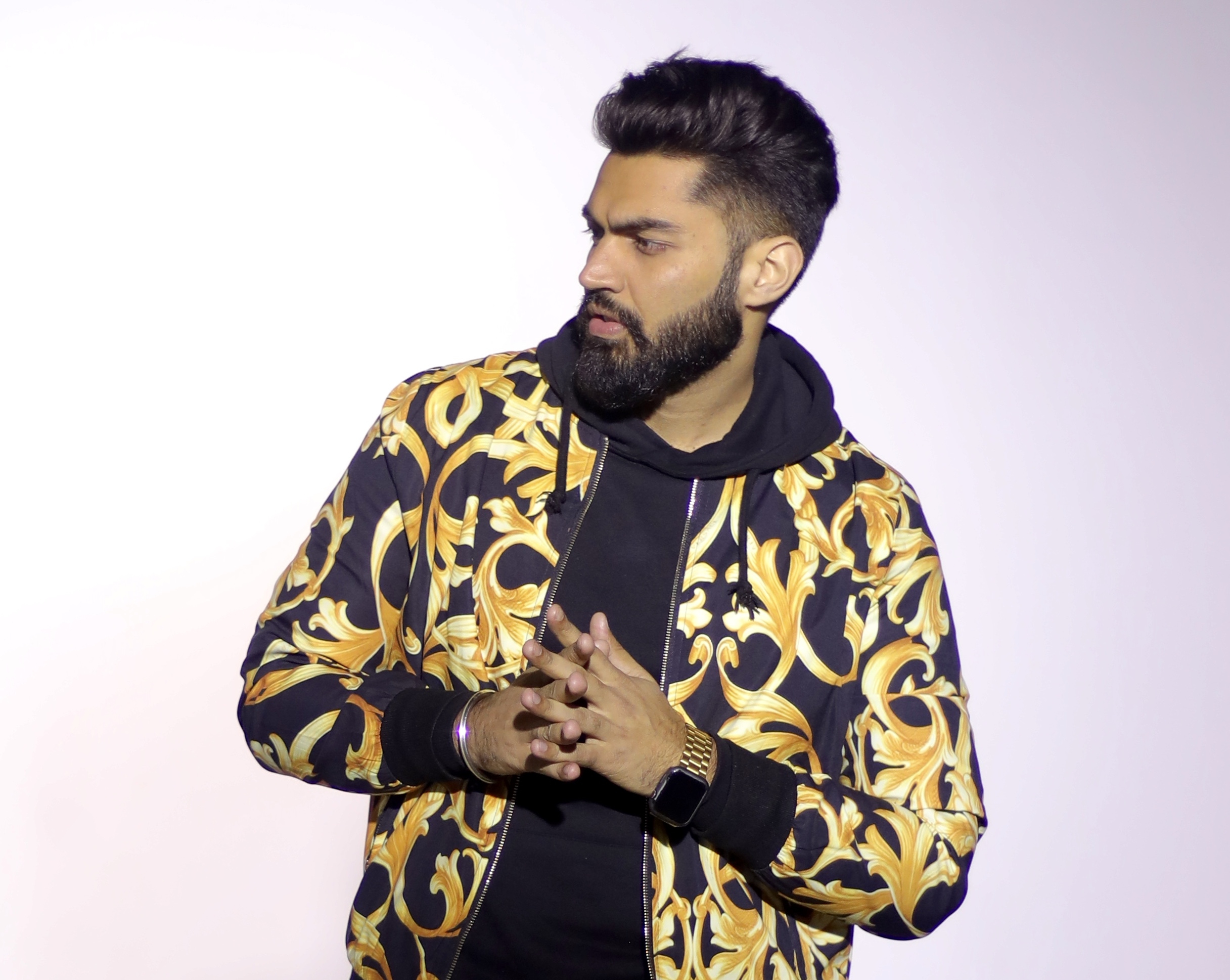
- Navi Lubana in 2020
- Born: Jalandhar
- Occupations: Music Video Director; Model

Navi Lubana is an Indian music video director. He is best known for his music videos like Sunroof, Giddha, Open Head, Mere Yaar, Chann and Thok Thar di. He currently holds gas station & indian restaurant in US

== Career ==
Lubana was born in Jalandhar. Lubana has done MBA in International Business & Finance. He made his directing debut with Chann Song. In 2018, he directed a video of Song Thok Thar Di but rose to prominence with his directed video of Song Open Head By Singer Elly Mangat & Shehnaz Kaur Gill.

=== As a model ===
Lubana worked as a model in the song "Nakhre" by Jassie Gill, "Breezer" by Armaan Bedil, "ByGod" by B Jay Randhawa, "Door" by Kanwar Chahal, "5-7 Yaar" by Karan Randhawa and "Ja ve Mundya" by Ranjit Bawa.

== Selected music videos ==
- Giddha - Elly Mangat & Afsana Khan
- Sunroof - Elly Mangat & Sultaan
- Thok Thar Di - Taji
- Chann - Akhilesh Nagar
- Mere Yaar - Sultaan
- Thok Thar Di 2 -taji
- Openhead - Elly Mangat & Shehnaz Kaur Gill
- Cops - Taji
- Mirror - Gajjan Singh
- Nattiyan - Elly Mangat
- Charche - Elly Mangat & Bhinder Virk
- Dollar Vs Yaari - Raja
- High Kirdar - Taji
- Jatt Gang - Jgill
