= Dailyhunt =

Indian content and news aggregator application

- Original author: Virendra Gupta
- Developer: Dailyhunt
- Release: 28 September 2010; 15 years ago

Stable release(s)
- Android: 16.2.7 / 6 August 2020; 6 years ago
- iOS: 10.0.0 / 5 August 2020; 6 years ago
- Operating system: Android; iOS
- Size: 69.5 MB (iOS); 14.30 MB (Android)
- Available in: 14 languages
- List of languages: Hindi; English; Assamese; Bengali; Bhojpuri; Gujarati; Kannada; Malayalam; Marathi; Odia; Punjabi; Tamil; Telugu; Urdu
- Type: News; Content
- License: Freeware
- Website: www.dailyhunt.com

Dailyhunt (formerly Newshunt) is an Indian content and news aggregator application based in Bangalore, India that provides local language content in 14 Indian languages from multiple content providers.

Viru serves as Founder of Dailyhunt with Co-founder Umang Bedi.

== History ==
Dailyhunt, earlier called Newshunt, was created as a Symbian app in 2009 by two ex-Nokia employees Umesh Kulkarni and Chandrashekhar Sohoni. Later in 2011, Newshunt became available on the Android platform. It was by that time that Virendra Gupta, founder of Verse acquired the application.

Virendra Gupta, better known as Viru, had started Verse in 2007 as a value-added service (VAS) company. In 2011, he acquired Newshunt from its owners Umesh and Chandrashekhar. Umesh became the CTO and stayed on to oversee its transition towards the smartphone era.

In 2015, Viru renamed Newshunt as Dailyhunt. In early 2018, Viru roped in Umang Bedi, to be the President of Dailyhunt and lead the business with him while focusing on making the benefits of the platform available to a larger audience. Umang was elevated to co-founder in 2020.

== Funding ==
In September 2014, Dailyhunt (then known as Newshunt) closed its Series B funding of INR 1 billion ( or approx $12 million in 2014) from Sequoia Capital India. The Series C funding round was led by Falcon Capital and was closed with $40 million in February 2015. In October 2016, the company received its Series D funding of $25 million from ByteDance and a Series E funding of $6.39 million from Falcon Edge Capital in September 2018. Additionally, Dailyhunt raised $3 Mn (INR 21.75 Cr) in a Series F funding round from Stonebridge Capital in August 2019. Other investors of Dailyhunt include Matrix Partners India, Omidyar Network, Goldman Sachs and Sofina.

== Tie-ups and partnerships ==
In January 2021, Dailyhunt partnered with Twitter to bring ‘Twitter Moments’ to the Indian social app. Dailyhunt app now has a dedicated tab called “Twitter Moments India” to showcase curated tweets pertaining to news and other events.

In January 2021, Dailyhunt announced the premiere of Season 2 of the popular show QuoteUnquote with KK (Kapil Khandelwal) on the app. It was the first podcast to have been launched on the Dailyhunt app.

In September 2020, Dailyhunt signed up as an Associate Sponsor with Star Sports for Dream 11 IPL 2020.

In May 2020, Snapdeal partnered with Dailyhunt to add new content on marketplace.

In March 2019, Discovery Communications India, the factual entertainment network, entered into a multi-year partnership with Dailyhunt to showcase short-form content.
