= Garry Sandhu =

Indian singer, actor, song-writer

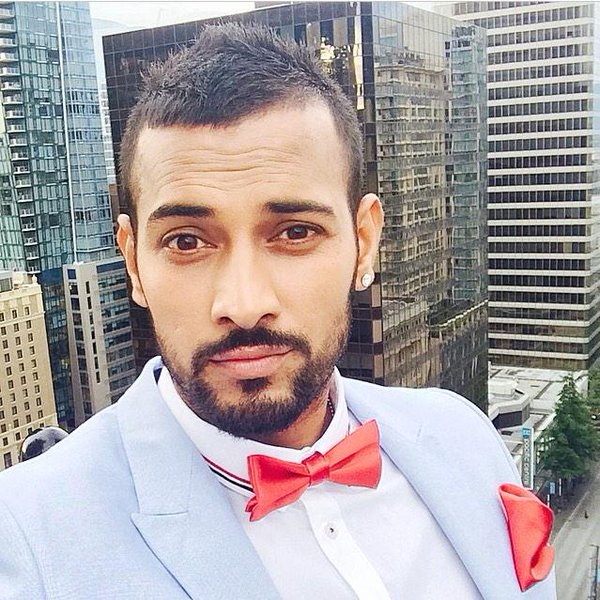
- Sandhu during the video shoot of Banda Ban Ja in 2017
- Born: Gurmukh Singh Sandhu; 4 April 1984 (age 42); Rurka Kalan, Jalandhar, Punjab, India
- Occupations: Singer; rapper; songwriter; actor
- Years active: 2010–present
- Awards: Full List
- Musical career
- Genres: Bhangra; romantic
- Label: Fresh Media Records

Gurmukh Singh "Garry" Sandhu, is an Indian singer, songwriter, rapper and actor known for his work in Punjabi music. Originally, he came to the United Kingdom on a study visa, and worked as a construction worker situated in the Birmingham area illegally and got deported. Whilst working, he would aspire to eventually make his songwriting into an actual career. He made his singing debut in 2010 with song "Main Ni Peenda" and acting debut with the film Romeo Ranjha (2014). He has released songs including Illegal Weapon, Yeah Baby, Banda Ban Ja, Excuses etc. He also owns his record label Fresh Media Records. In 2019, his song "Yeah Baby" was released in a bollywood film De De Pyaar De as "Hauli Hauli". He has been nominated for many awards at PTC Punjabi Music Awards.Business Today reported that Sandhu's song Illegal Weapon was one of the top YouTube music videos in India.

== Discography ==
=== Albums/EPs ===
Title	Year	Music	Label
Fresh	2011	DJ Dips, Roach Killa, Kam Frantic, DJ H, GV	MovieBox/Goyal Music
Magic	2012	Rupin Kahlon, DJ Dips, Dr. Zeus	MovieBox/Fresh Media Records
Fresh All The Way	2014	Beat Minister	Fresh Media Records
Still Here	2023	Rahul Sathu, Josh Sidhu	Fresh Media Records
dnd	2026	Josh Sidhu	Fresh Media Records

=== Singles ===
Title	Year	Music	Peak chart positions	Lyrics	Album
Title	Year	Music	UK Asian	Lyrics	Album
"Sahan To Pyariya"	2011	DJ H	1	Garry Sandhu	Fresh
"Main Nee Peenda"	2011	Kam Frantic	16	Garry Sandhu	Fresh
"Fresh"	2011	GV	2	Garry Sandhu	Fresh
"Tohar"	2011	DJ Dips	1	Garry Sandhu	Fresh
"Din Raat"	2011	DJ Dips	3	Garry Sandhu	Fresh
"Ik Gal" ( Ft Sudesh Kumari)	2012	DJ Dips	1	Garry Sandhu	Non-album singles
"Raatan"	2012	Rupin Kahlon	2	Garry Sandhu	Magic
"Door"	2012	Rupin Kahlon	1	Deepa	Magic
"Hang"	2012	Rupin Kahlon	3	Chandra Sarai	Magic
"Brick"	2012	GV	1	Tari Banwal puria	Old Habits Die Hard
"Sangdi"	2012	DJ Dips	7	Garry Sandhu	Project: Bhangra
"Ja Ni Ja"	2013	Rupin Kahlon	3	Chandra Sarai	Non-Album Singles
"Ban Ban Ja"	2014	Beat Minister	-	Veet Baljit	Fresh All The Way
"Do Botlaan"	2014	Beat Minister	-	Veet Baljit	Fresh All The Way
"Ego"	2014	Beat Minister	-	Pinka	Fresh All The Way
"Mere Baare"	2015	DJ Dips		Garry Sandhu	Non- Album Singles
"Jaanu"	2016	GV		Garry Sandhu	Non- Album Singles
"Tadap"	2016	Prit		Garry Sandhu	Non- Album Singles
"One Touch"	2016	Deep Jandu		Lally Mundi	Non- Album Singles
"Excuses"	2017	Vee		Ricky Khan	Non- Album Singles
"Laddu"(featuring Jasmine Sandlas)	2017	Goldboy	11	Baljit Pasla, Beat Minister	Non- Album Singles
"Rabb Jane"	2017	Jhony Vik & Vee	16	Shah Ali	Non- Album Singles
"Illegal Weapon"(featuring Jasmine Sandlas)	2017	Intense	3	Garry Sandhu	Non- Album Singles
"Dil De Kareeb"	2017	John Samuel	--	Fateh Shergill	Non- Album Singles
"Kill"	2017	Vee	—	Garry Sandhu	Non- Album Singles
"Ola Ola"	2018	Intense	—	Garry Sandhu	Non- Album Singles
"Yeh Baby"	2018	Ikky	7	Garry Sandhu	Non- Album Singles
"I Swear"	2018	Ikky	32	Garry Sandhu	Non- Album Singles
"Tutya Garoor"	2018	Habib Kaler	—	Shah Ali	Non- Album Singles
"Snapchat"	2018	Lovey Akhtar	--	Garry Sandhu	Non- Album Singles
"Love You Jatta"	2018	Rahul Sathu	—	Garry Sandhu	Non- Album Singles
"Do Gallan"	2018	Rahul Sathu	—	Garry Sandhu	Non- Album Singles
"Alert Kudey"	2019	Ikky	—	Garry Sandhu	Non- Album Singles
"Dobara Milde Aan"	2019	Lovey Akhtar	—	Garry Sandhu	Non- Album Singles
"Hauli Hauli"	2019	Tanishk Bagchi	6	Tanishk Bagchi, Garry Sandhu	De De Pyaar De
"Take Off"	2019	Lovey Akhtar	—	Kharewala Brar	Non-album singles
"Doabey Wala"	2019	Ikky	30	Garry Sandhu	Non-album singles
"Meri Aakad"	2019	Intense	—	Happy Pasowal	Laiye Je Yaarian
"U & I"	2019	Snappy	—	Rav Hanjra	Laiye Je Yaarian
"Like You"	2019	Rahul Sathu	10	Garry Sandhu	Non-album singles
"Bottle"	2019	Ikky	—	Garry Sandhu	Non-album singles
"Illegal Weapon 2.0"	2020	Tanishk Bagchi	1	Priya Sariya	Street Dancer 3D
"Sip Sip 2.0"(featuring Jasmine Sandlas)	2020	Tanishk Bagchi	— (Note: The song didn't appear on UK Asian chart, but the original version had peaked at number one on the chart.)	Garry Sandhu, Kumaar	Street Dancer 3D
"Wallah Wallah"	2020	Ikky / Yeah Proof	—	Garry Sandhu	Non-album singles
"Techi"	2020	Lovey Akhtar	—	Garry Sandhu	Fresh Side Vol. 1
"Pabb Hauli"(featuring Pav Dharia)	2020	Pav Dharia	—	Garry Sandhu	Non-album singles
"Faida Chak Gayi"	2020	Lovey Akhtar	—	Mani Kakra	Non-album singles
"Jatt"(featuring Sultaan)	2020	J Statik	22	Garry Sandhu	Non-album singles
"Zindagi & Chingari "	2020	Beat Minister & Jhonny Vick	—	Garry Sandhu Gurwinder	Non-album singles
"Coming Home"(featuring Naseebo Lal, Sultana, Roach Killa)	2020	Roack Killa	34	Garry Sandhu	Non-album singles
"Ishq"(featuring Shipra Goyal, Myles Castello)	2021	Ikky		Garry Sandhu	Non-album singles
"Coming Home"	2021	Rahul Sathu		Garry Sandhu	Non-album singles
"Feelinga"	2021	Daddy Beats		Garry Sandhu	Adhi Tape
"Fitoor"	2021	Josh Sidhu		Garry Sandhu	Adhi Tape
"Too Much"	2021	Josh Sidhu		Garry Sandhu	Adhi Tape
"Jigar Da Tota"	2022	Habib Kaler	-	Garry Sandhu	Non-album singles

=== As featured Artist or Lyricist ===
Title	Year	Artist(s)	Lyricist	Music
Channa	2015	Sartaj Virk	Garry Sandhu	Beat Minister
Gora Rang	2018	G Khan, Garry Sandhu	Ricky Khan	Ar Deep
Sip Sip	2018	Jasmine Sandlas	Garry Sandhu	Intense
Chandigarh Shehar	2019	G Khan, Afsana Khan	Garry Sandhu	Aman Hayer
Dollar	2019	G Khan, Garry Sandhu	Fateh Shergill	Goldboy
Pachtayian	2019	Mehar Vaani, G Khan	Garry Sandhu	Kaler Habib
Jee Karda	2020	G Khan, Khan Saab, Mehar Vaani	Garry Sandhu	Kaler Habib, Enzo
Chan Makhna	2020	G Khan	Garry Sandhu	Kaler Habib
Pyaar Ni Karda	2021	G Khan	Garry Sandhu	Daddy Beats
Tenu Soh Lagge	2021	Uday Shergill, Garry Sandhu	Lavvi Tibi	Daddy Beats
Grow	2021	Sartaj Virk, Garry Sandhu	Homeboy, Garry Sandhu	Yeah Proof
Nachdi	2021	G Khan, Garry Sandhu	Garry Sandhu	Daddy Beats
Teru Yaad	2021	G Khan	Garry Sandhu	ProdGk
Are You Ok	2021	Harpinder Gill, Garry Sandhu	Garry Sandhu	The Kidd
80 90	2021	Ikky, Amrit Maan, Garry Sandhu	Amrit Maan, Garry Sandhu	Ikky
Duniya Saari	2021	Sartaj Virk	Garry Sandhu	Kaler Habib
Good Luck ( Female Version)	2021	Simran Kaur Dhadli	Garry Sandhu	Rahul Sathu
Patli Patang	2021	G Khan, Sartaj Virk	Garry Sandhu	Daddy Beats
Do Gallan	2021	Neha Kakkar, Rohanpreet Singh	Garry Sandhu	Rajat Nagpal
Tod Gayi	2022	Khan Saab, Garry Sandhu	Garry Sandhu	Daddy Beats

=== Soundtracks ===
Song	Year	Film/Album
"Main Kina Tenu Karda"	2013	Jatt Boys Putt Jattan De
"Chandri Raat, Athroo"	2014	Romeo Ranjha
"Hauli Hauli"	2019	De De Pyaar De
"Meri Aakad"	2019	Laiye Je Yaarian
"U & I"	2019	Laiye Je Yaarian
"Sip Sip 2.0"	2020	Street Dancer 3D
"Illegal Weapon 2.0"	2020	Street Dancer 3D

== Filmography ==
Year	Film	Role	Playback	Notes
2014	Romeo Ranjha	Ranjha	Chandri Raat, Athroo	Debut Film
2020	Chal Mera Putt 2	Deepa		

== Awards and nominations ==
Year	Song/Album	Award Ceremony	Category	Result	Ref
2011		Brit Asia TV Music Awards	Best Newcomer	Won	
2011		Brit Asia TV Music Awards	Best Male Act	Won	
2012	Sahan To Piyariya	PTC Punjabi Music Awards	Best Debut Vocalist (Male)	Won	
2012	Sahan To Piyariya	PTC Punjabi Music Awards	Most Romantic Ballad of the Year	Nominated	
2013	Ik Gal	PTC Punjabi Music Awards	Best Bhangra Song	Nominated	
2013	Raatan	PTC Punjabi Music Awards	Romantic Ballad of the Year	Nominated	
2013	Hang	PTC Punjabi Music Awards	Most Popular Song of the Year	Nominated	
2013	Raatan	PTC Punjabi Music Awards	Best Pop Vocalist (Male)	Nominated	
2013	Magic	PTC Punjabi Music Awards	Best Album of the Year	Nominated	
2013	Ik Gal	PTC Punjabi Music Awards	Best Duet Vocalists	Won	
