= Jass Bajwa =

Indian singer, actor (born 1988)

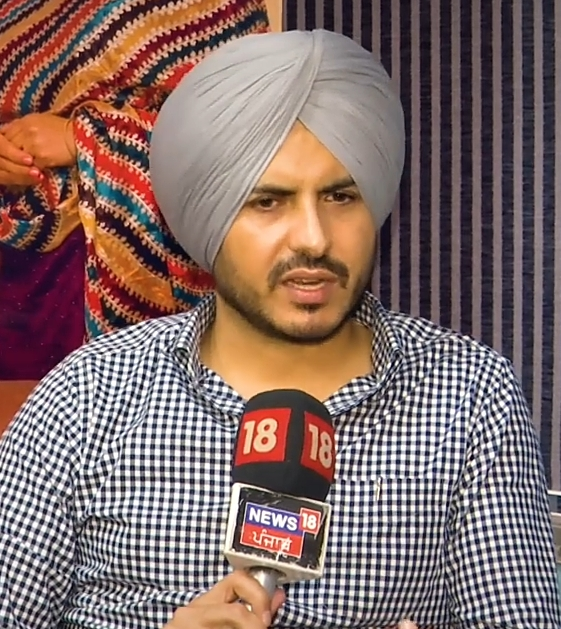
- Bajwa in 2024
- Born: Jaspreet Singh Bajwa
- Occupations: Singer actor songwriter
- Years active: (2014-present)
- Musical career
- Origin: India
- Genres: Punjabi; Bhangra; Romantic; Pop
- Labels: Crown Records; Speed Records; White Hill Music

Jass Bajwa is an Indian singer, songwriter and actor associated with Punjabi language music and films. He started his singing career in September 2014 with his album Chakvi Mandeer and made his acting debut in Thug Life released in 2017.

== Career ==
He made his singing debut with the album titled Chakvi Mandeer in the year 2014.

After his debut album, he released multiple singles including "Feem Di Dalli", "Kismat", "Tolla" and "Tera Time" among others. In 2015, he released his second album "Jatt Sauda".

After establishing himself as a singer, he tried his luck in acting and made his acting debut with the Punjabi film Thug Life in 2017. In 2017, he launched various singles like "Nose Pin" and "Dil De Raaje". His new album Urban Zimidar was also released in the same year. In 2018, he is releasing his fourth album titled as Jatt Nation on 10 November.

== Album discography ==
Album	Year	Record label	Music	Tracks
Chakvi Mandeer	2014	Panj-aab Records	Gupz Sehra	8
Jatt Sauda	2015	Crown Records	Gupz Sehra	9
Urban Zimidar	2017	Speed Records	Deep Jandu	9
Jatt Nation	2018	Ripple Music Studios	Dr. Zeus & Gupz Sehra	9
Aflatoon EP	2023	Mee Muzic	Desi Crew, Starboy X & Preet Hundal	5

== Singles discography ==
Title	Year	Music	Record label	Album
Dharti	2016	Gupz Sehra	Crown Records	
Nose Pin	2016	Deep Jandu	Crown Records	
Dil De Raaje	2017	Deep Jandu	Crown Records	
Satrangi Titli	2017	Desi Crew	Speed Records	
Excuse Me	2017	Deep Jandu	Speed Records	Urban Zimidaar
Urban Zimidar	2017	Deep Jandu	Speed Records	Urban Zimidaar
12 Vise	2017	Deep Jandu	Speed Records	Urban Zimidaar
Gabru Ni Bolda	2017	Western Penduz	Western Penduz	
Photoaan	2018	Dj Flow	Speed Records	
Butterfly	2018	Mix Singh	White Hill Music	
Don't Judge Me	2018	Rick Hrt	Ripple Music Studios	
Veham Jatt Da	2019	Beat Inspector	Jass Bajwa Music/Ghaint Geet LTD	
Little Bit (featuring Karan Aujla)	2019	Deep Jandu	Nupur Audio	
Peg Nachda	2019	Prit	T-Series	
Faraar	2020	Randy J	VR Beats	
Khrey Khrey Jatt (featuring Gur Sidhu)	2020	Gur Sidhu	Desi Junction	
Jimidar Gabru	2020	Gur Sidhu	Swag Music	
kARAN AUJLA	2020	Rich Boy	Jass Bajwa	
Scorpio	2020	Mxrci	Jass Bajwa	(features Dhillon Preet)
Czechoslovakia	2020	Mxrci	Jass Bajwa	
Jatta Takda Hoja	2020	G Skillz	Jass Bajwa	
Kisaan Anthem	2020	Flamme	Jass Bajwa	
Sabha Da Time	2020	Flame Music	Jass Bajwa	
Fateh Anthem	2021	Flamme	Shree Brar Music	
Jinni Sohni	2021	Yeah Proof	Planet Recordz	
Ashke Ashke		Gaiphy	Jass Bajwa	
Jhooth Bolda	2022	Mix Singh	Speed Records	
Jatta Ik Tere Karke	2022	Ronn Sandhu	Crown Records	
2 Number (featuring Gur Sidhu)	2022	Gur Sidhu	Zora Studios	
Just Round	2022	Desi Crew	Mee Music	
High Life	2022	StarboyX	Jass Bajwa	

== Filmography ==
Year	Film	Role	Notes
2017	Thug Life	Jass	Nominated for Best Debut Actor Award
2019	Doorbeen	Ranjeet (Police Officer)	
2022	Sohreyan Da Pind Aa Gaya	TBA	
2023	Es Jahano Door Kitte Chal Jindiye	Mehtab Singh	
2024	Bibi Rajni		
