= Mambalam =

Mambalam is most popularly used to refer to West Mambalam, a residential neighbourhood in the city of Chennai, India with East Mambalam being used historically for the adjoining T. Nagar.

Mambalam may also refer to these related to the area:

- Mambalam railway station
- Mambalam taluk, a subdistrict and township in Chennai district
- Mambalam zamindari, a zamindari estate during the pre-colonial and colonial era.
