= Pondy Bazaar =

Pondy Bazaar பாண்டி பஜார்
- Shopping hub
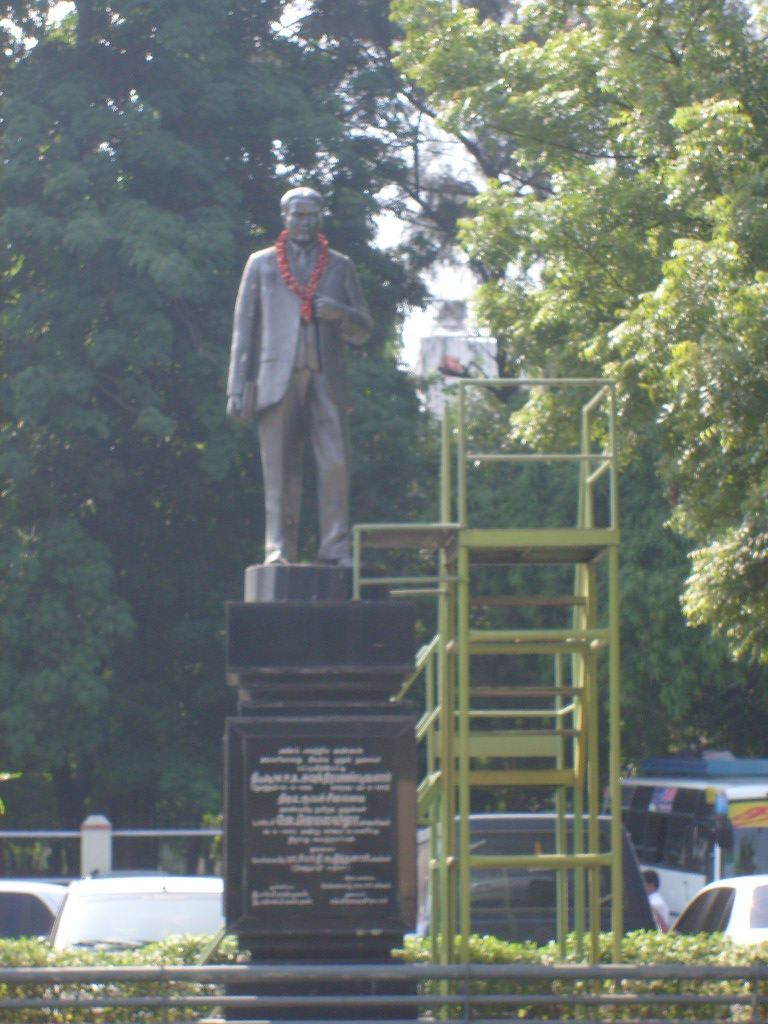
- Statue of Soundarapandian at the entrance to Pondy Bazaar, Chennai

- Location within Chennai
- Coordinates: 13.04043°N 80.23997°E
- Country: India
- State: Tamil Nadu
- District: Chennai District
- Metro: Chennai

Government
  - Body: Chennai Corporation

Languages
  - Official: Tamil
- Time zone: UTC+5:30 (IST)
- Planning agency: CMDA
- Civic agency: Chennai Corporation
- Website: www.chennai.tn.nic.in

Pondy Bazaar, officially called Soundarapandianar Angadi, is an indian market situated on Sir Theagaraya Road in T. Nagar, Chennai. Along with Ranganathan Street and Panagal Park, it makes up one of the principal shopping districts of Chennai.

== Etymology ==
The market Soundarapandianar Bazaar was named after Justice Party politician W. P. A. Soundarapandian Nadar whose statue is situated in the square. The police station in that area is officially called Soundarapandiyanar Angadi Kaval Nilayam.

== Transport ==
Theyagaraya Road, which is the arterial road of Pondy Bazaar, suffers from slow-moving traffic. To ease the traffic, the Metropolitan Transport Corporation (Chennai) has diverted buses going to the T. Nagar bus terminus that used to go via Pondy Bazaar. They now travel via the Thanikachalam Road-Burkit Road route. For some routes, such as the 47s and 11s, the buses occasionally go via Pondy Bazaar and occasionally via the diversion.

Private vehicles headed for the T. Nagar bus terminus or for Anna Salai (Saidapet and beyond) are strongly encouraged to either use the Thanikachalam Road route or Boag Road, rather than the Pondy Bazaar route, especially during rush hour.

== Shopping district ==
=== Clothes, footwear, and mobiles accessories ===
Pondy Bazaar has a wide variety of clothing, accessories and footwear stores in all price ranges within a two or 3 km radius. It is a one stop destination for the multi-brand retail.

Along with independent retailers there are name brand stores such as Indian Terrain, Arrow Woodland, Bata, Fastrack, Titan, Mochi Globus, Raymond Group, Reebok, Nike, Lee, Wrangler, Levi Strauss & Co. Health & Glow and Colour Plus along with cheaper outlets like Big Bazaar and Sri Krishna Collections. Popular clothing independent retailers include Instore, Naidu Hall and MilanJyothi, amongst others. Mobile store chains Univercell and Poorvika are also present in Pondy Bazaar.

=== Commodities ===
Saravana Stores is one of the biggest commercial stores in Chennai. Commodities from safety pins to gold and diamond jewellery are available here. Rathna Stores has a big branch in Pondy Bazaar, where commodities ranging from umbrellas to cooking utensils are available at low prices. The shop has five floors. Ponni Stores. Rathna Fan House (not to be confused with Rathna Stores) is a place for electrical accessories such as fans, air conditioners, and refrigerators. Formerly specialised in lingerie, Naidu Hall now offers garments of all types.

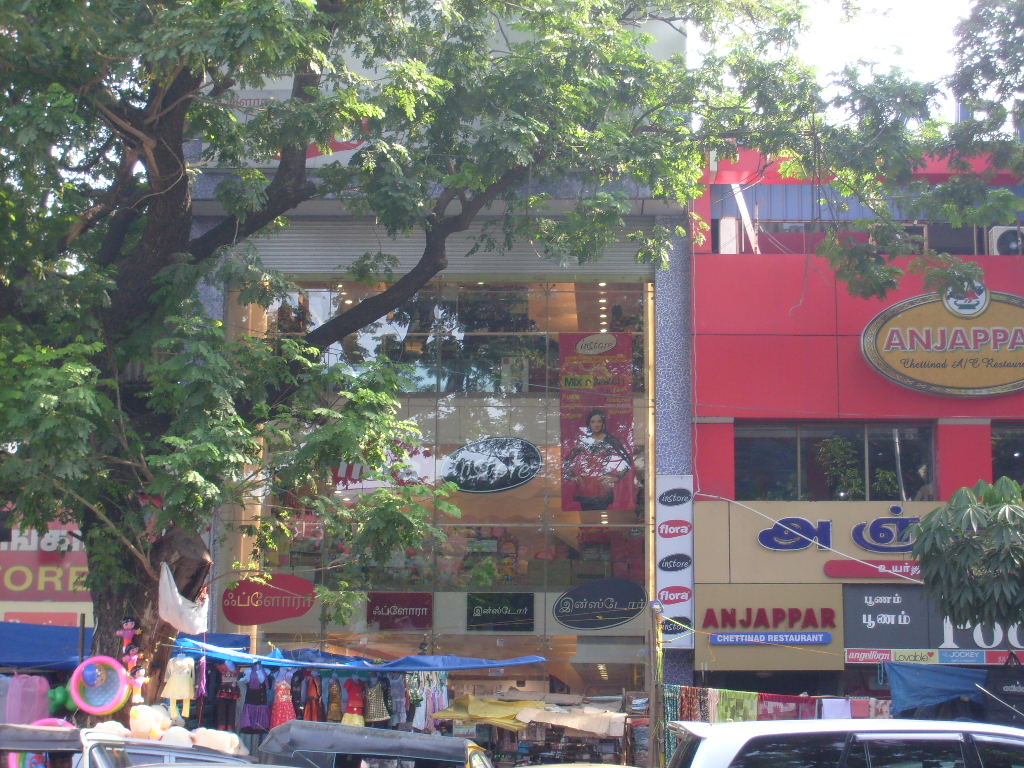
Shops in Pondy Bazaar

=== Roadside vendors ===
Many commodities such as used books, buckets, ropes, soap cases, hair bands, bangles, bags, and other accessories are available from roadside vendors at Pondy Bazaar. These roadside shops form the chief attraction of Pondy bazaar. Most of the commodities in the roadside shops have no fixed price and so the customers and vendors can often be seen bargaining. On weekends the pavements on either side of which the shops are located are crowded. The roadside shops bring in the new fashions of Chennai accessories.

=== Restaurants ===
Some of the popular restaurants in and around Pondy Bazaar are Saravana Bhavan, Balaajee Bhavan, Geetha's Cafe, Hot Chips, Adyar Anandha Bhavan, Hotel Woodlands, Anjjapar, and Bombay Halwa House.

Ambica Apppalam Depot which stocks wide varieties of Masalas and Appalams (Papads) is also located in a street perpendicular to Pondy Bazaar.

== Hotels ==
At the eastern edge of Pondy Bazaar, two major star hotels are located: Grand Chennai by GRT Hotels and Residency Towers.

== Temples ==
Tirumala Tirupati Devastanam, located near Venkatnaraya Road (T. Nagar), is a temple of Lord Balaji. Mupathamman Temple, located near Duraiswamy Bridge, is a temple for Mariamman.

== Schools ==
Ramakrishan Mission School and a hostel, the Sarada Vidyalaya, a school for girls are opposite Panagal Park. Ramakrishna Mission Schools are situated in Burkit Road and in Dandapani Street near the T. Nagar bus stand and Habibullah Road, around a km away. Holy Angels Girls School is along the pedestrian plaza. Shrine Vailankanni Senior Secondary School is a school in Dhandapani Street, with classes from kindergarten to twelfth standard.

== Pondy Bazaar street makeover ==
Pondy Bazaar was selected under the Chennai Smart City development project to fix up the streets, pathways, bus stops, parking spots, toilets and shopping areas with a new, cleaner street. Special features of the new street include a widen footpath, child friendly play equipment, vibrant lighting, colorful walls, battery operated feeder vehicles, Smart Bikes and women's and men's lounge areas.

These new smart features have resulted in increased revenue, greater safety of pedestrians, better air quality and use of public areas as recreation zones.
