= Panagal Park =

Park and locality in Chennai, India

Panagal Park பனகல் பூங்கா
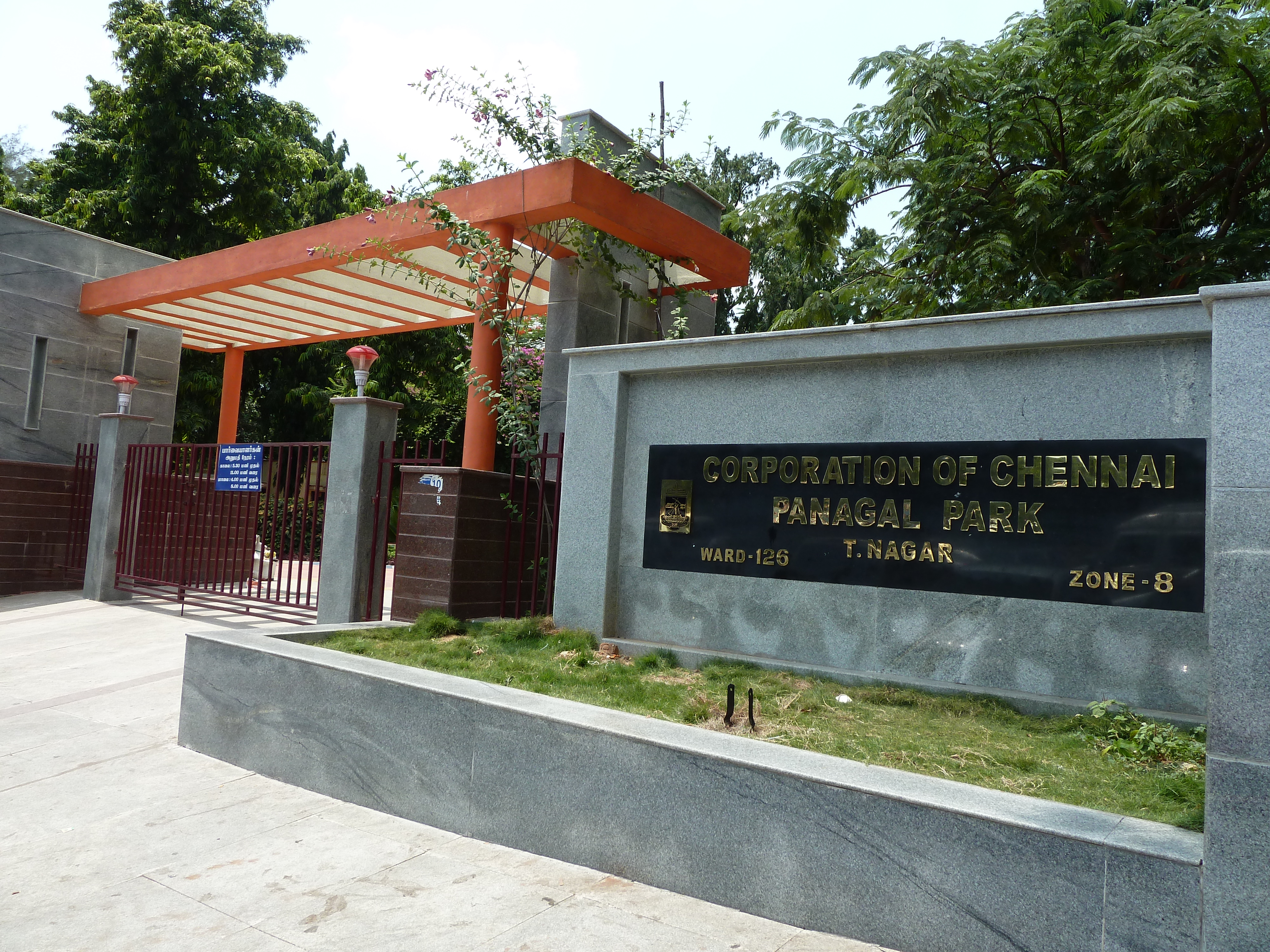
- Entrance of Panagal Park
- Interactive map of Panagal Park பனகல் பூங்கா
- Type: Urban park
- Location: T.Nagar in Chennai, India
- Coordinates: 13.0413°N 80.2331°E
- Area: 8 acres (3.2 hectares)
- Created: c. 1923
- Operator: Corporation of Chennai
- Status: Open all year

Panagal Park is a public park in Thyagaraya Nagar, Chennai named after Sir Panaganti Ramarayaningar, the Raja of Panagal. Situated at the heart of the busy shopping district of T. Nagar, it also gives its name to the surrounding locality.

== History ==
When the Long Lake on the western peripheral region of the old city was drained out and the area of T. Nagar was newly carved out of the existing neighborhood of Mambalam in 1923, a park was developed in the centre of the new locality intended to be a residential one. The park was named Panagal Park honouring the then Chief Minister of Madras, the Raja of Panagal.

In the early days, there was a public radio inside the park to cater the visitors who gathered there to listen to music and news and stayed till the last news broadcast at 7.15 p.m.

The architect of Panagal Park was Ganesh Iyer.

== The park ==
The park covers 8 acres (3.2 hectares) (19,434 square meter) and has three entry points. As of 2019, the park has about 218 trees, including gulmohar, neem, peepal, almond, big-leaf mahogany, mast trees, and West Indian elms.

== Renovation ==
In 2008, the Chennai Corporation started renovating the park at a cost of ₹ 13 million. The renovated works included construction of children's play area and public convenience (₹ 1.182 million), beautification of the three entry points (₹ 2.281 million), development of lotus pond and sitting gallery (₹ 2.881 million), construction of walkways (₹ 4.370 million) and development of landscaped lawn (₹ 2.418 million).

The renovated park was reopened on 21 February 2010.

== Metro rail construction ==
Of the 19,434 square meters of the park, the Chennai Metro Rail requires 3,069 square meters of land for the metro rail project, which will be given back to the park once the construction is completed. Of the 218 trees, 87 will be cut down for the project. The nearest railway station is Mambalam railway station, which is 900 m away.

== Commercial establishments ==
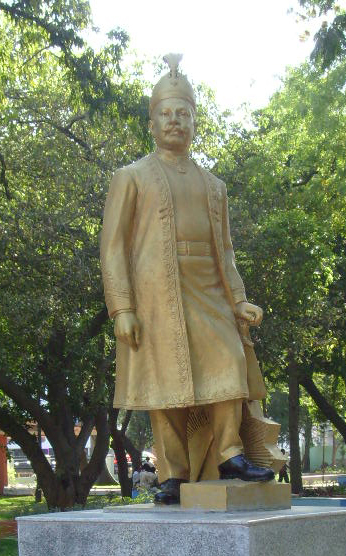
Statue of the Raja of Panagal inside Panagal Park

Panagal Park is a landmark to many commercial establishments and department stores. Almost all the shops offering Textiles and Jewellery are concentrated on South Usman Road and Ranganathan Street.

Several high-end retail stores surround the park, including Saravana Stores, Lalithaa Jewellery, Nalli Chinnasamy Chetti, Pothys, RMKV, and Sri Kumaran Silks.

There are two educational institutions of repute around the park apart from commercial establishments, Sri Ramakrishna Mission Higher Secondary School for Boys and Sri RKM Saradha Vidyalaya Girls Higher Secondary School.

== Roads ==
Six arterial roads radiate outwards from the park:

- North Usman Road goes north towards Kodambakkam
- G N Chetty Road goes northeast towards Gemini Circle
- Thiyagaraya Road (known as Pondy Bazaar) goes east towards Teynampet Signal
- Venkatanarayana Road goes southeast towards Nandanam Junction
- South Usman Road goes south towards Saidapet
- Doraiswamy Road goes west towards West Mambalam

== See also ==
- Parks in Chennai
