= Karaneeswarar Temple, Saidapet =

Religion
- Affiliation: Hinduism
- District: Chennai
- Deity: Lord Shiva

Location
- Location: Saidapet in Chennai
- State: Tamil Nadu
- Country: India
- Interactive map of Karaneeswarar Temple, Saidapet
- Coordinates: 13.0248°N 80.2232°E

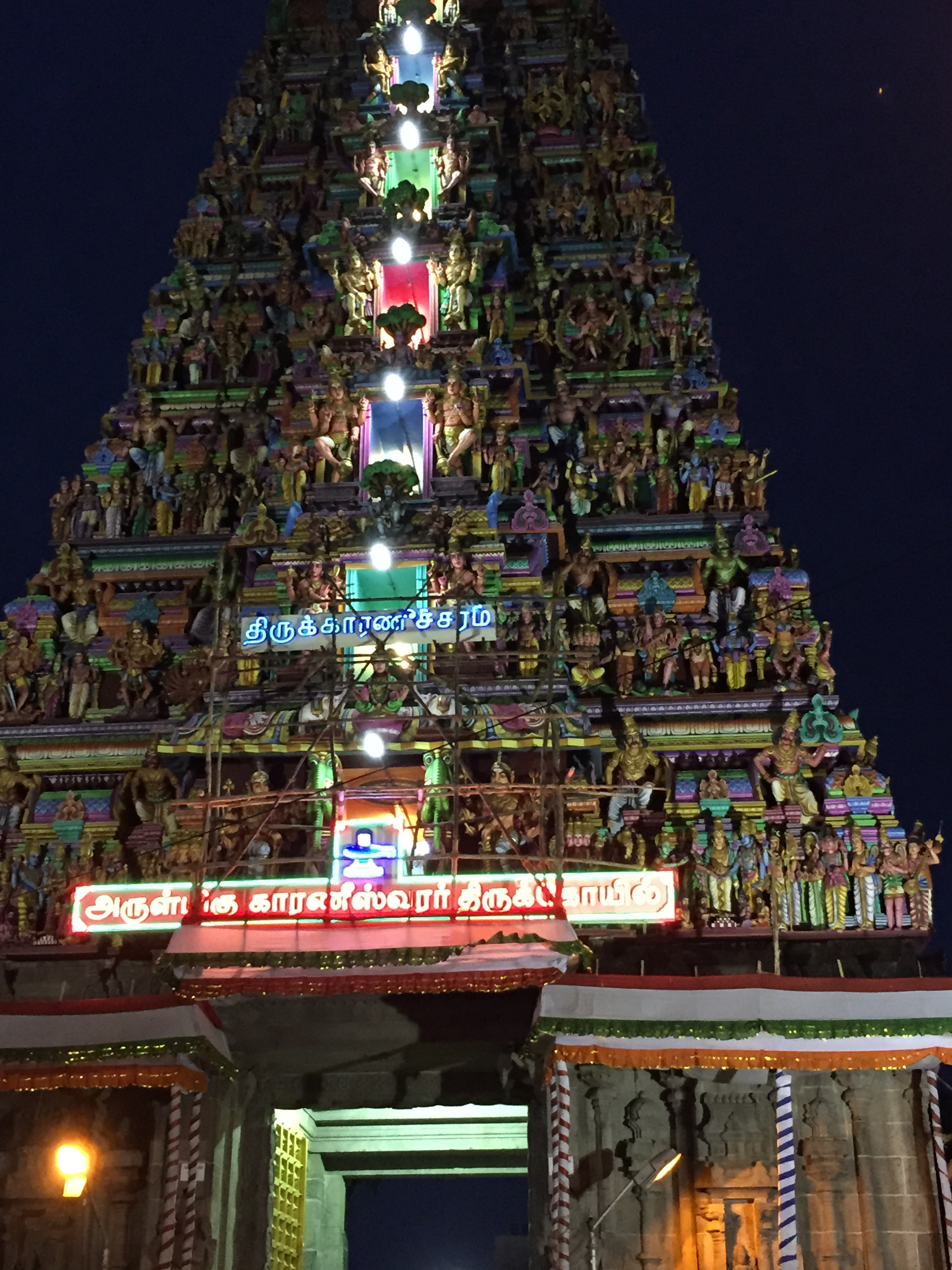
The main gopuram of the temple

Karaneeswarar Temple is a Hindu temple located in the neighborhood of Saidapet in Chennai, India. It is dedicated to Shiva. This is an ancient Temple presently managed by the HR & CE department of the Government of Tamil Nadu. The Goddess is known as "Swarnambika" (The Golden Mother). Apart from this, there are separate shrines for Lord Ganapathi, Lord Karthikeya and other Parivara Devtas. This temple is located next to the Saidapet Railway station.

== History and Legend ==
Lord Indra having given his divine cow " Kamadhenu" to Sage Vashishta is worried as she has not returned even after a long time .He find out that she has been cursed into becoming an ordinary one because she had created obstacles during Pooja and Prayer of Sage Vashishta. He consults his Ganas and on that basis finds out that the Holy Cow Kamadhenu can be redeemed if he constructs a Temple to Lord Shiva in between Mylapore and Thiruvanmiyur on the North western direction. He then ordains the clouds (Kar) to rain and cool the area thereby creating a wonderful green pasture. He installs a Linga and prays to the Lord Shiva - who redeems the holy cow and also blesses Lord Indra by granting him the status of Gopathi ( Lord of Cows). The tank made by Indra is known as Gopathi Saras. It is said that people who take a ritual bath in this tank on full moon days get cured of many of their illnesses.

== The Temple ground ==
This temple has a 7-storied Gopuram with two prakarams(closed precincts of a temple). This temple has a beautiful tank. We come across the shrine for Ganesha and as we move further after circumambulating the temple we come across the Shrine for Lord Karthikeya and further as we move towards the Dwajasthamba we cross the shrine of Lord Vedagiriswara. We enter the main precinct of the Temple where the main Shrine of Lord Karaneeswara and the Goddess Swarnambika are situated. We find beautiful idols of Lord Dakshinamoorthy and Nayanmars installed inside the inner Prakara (Precinct). There are also separate shrines for Lord Palani Andavar, Lord Virabhadra and Lord Surya inside the temple. Beside the Temple is the temple tank and on the steps of the tank we can find a shrine for Lord Ganesha - who is in a standing posture along with his consorts siddhi and Buddhi. This temple has a nandavanam (Garden) as well.

The temple is heavily crowded on Pradhosham days. The Annual ten-day Brahmotsavam takes place in the Tamil month of Chithirai. During Chitirai thirvizha, people visit the temple in huge numbers and there will be a daily spiritual talk on Thiruvasagam about Lord shiva. On the "Shiv Rathri" occasion the temple is attractively decorated.
