= Naihaa =

Indian retailer of women and children's wear in Chennai

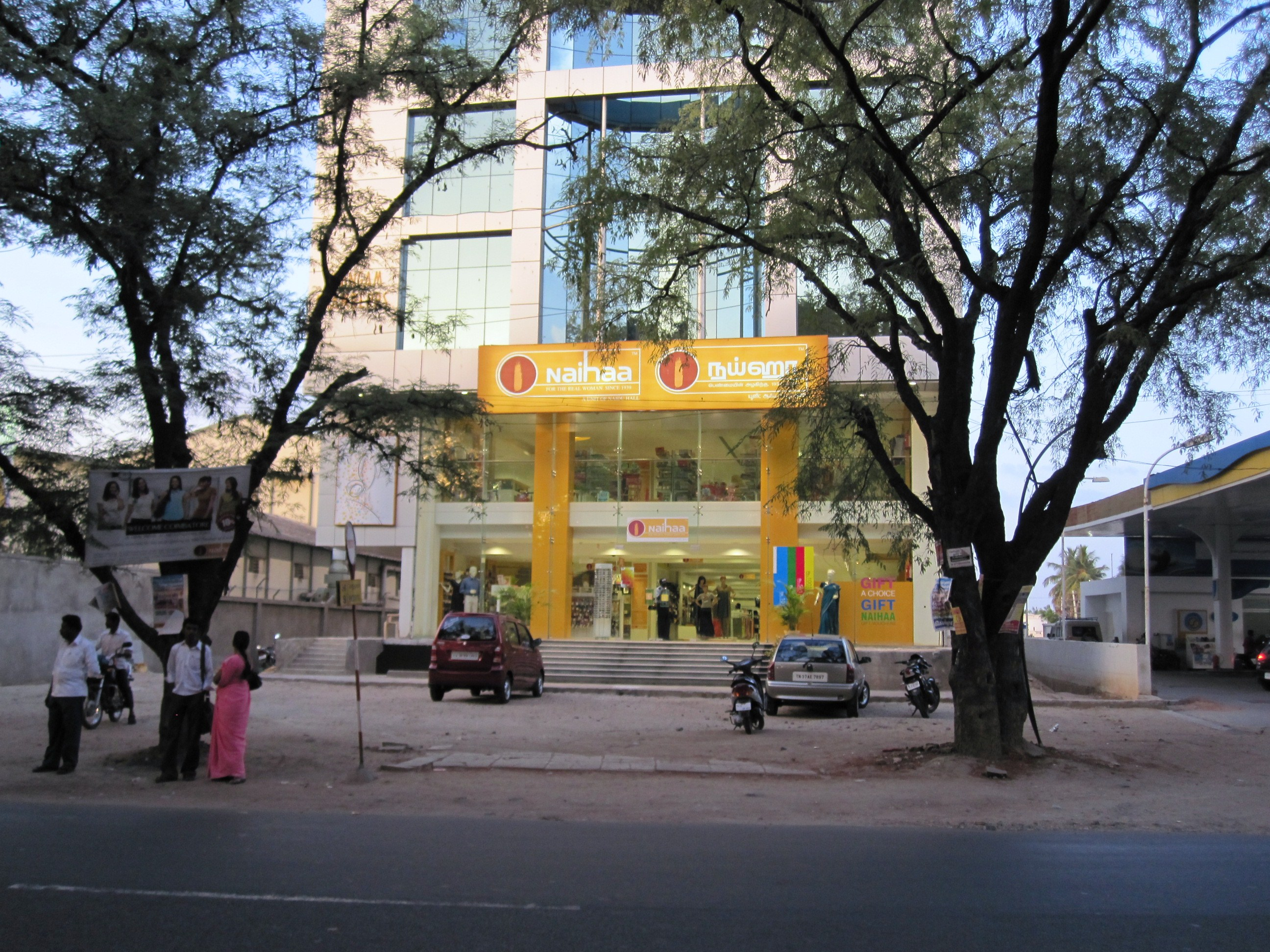
A shopping outlet of the wardrobe store Naihaa on Mettupalayam Road, Coimbatore

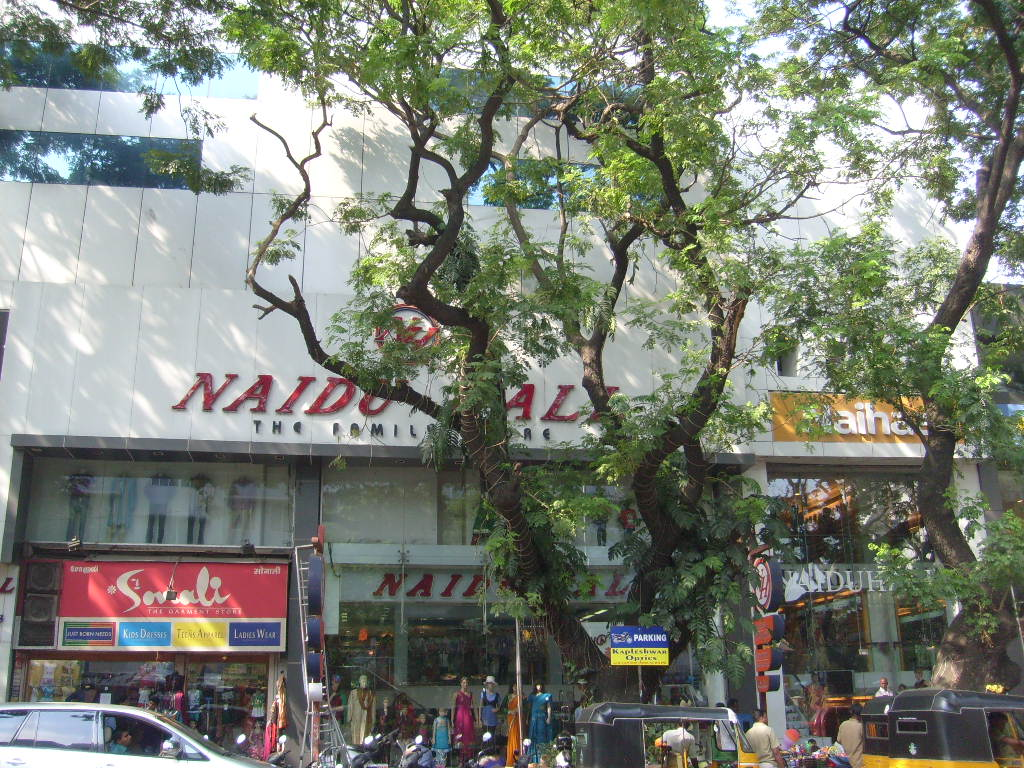
The main Naidu Hall store in Pondy Bazaar, Chennai

Naihaa (known as Naidu Hall from 1939 to 2001) is an Indian retailer of women and children's wear and wardrobe store based in Chennai.

== History ==
Naidu Hall was started in 1939 by M. G. Naidu from Gudiyattam. Naidu arrived in Madras in the early 1930s and had set up a tailoring shop in Raghavaiah Road, T. Nagar. In 1939, he moved to Pondy Bazaar where he set a shop which manufactured female garments. After his demise his sons Mr G.Sukumar, Mr Venugopal, Mr Ramaswamy were running the show. Mr. Venugopal owns Naidu Hall The Family Store which has now 14 branches. Mr Ramaswmy, Naidu hall women's exclusive .
