= Sharnga =

Celestial bow of the Hindu god Vishnu

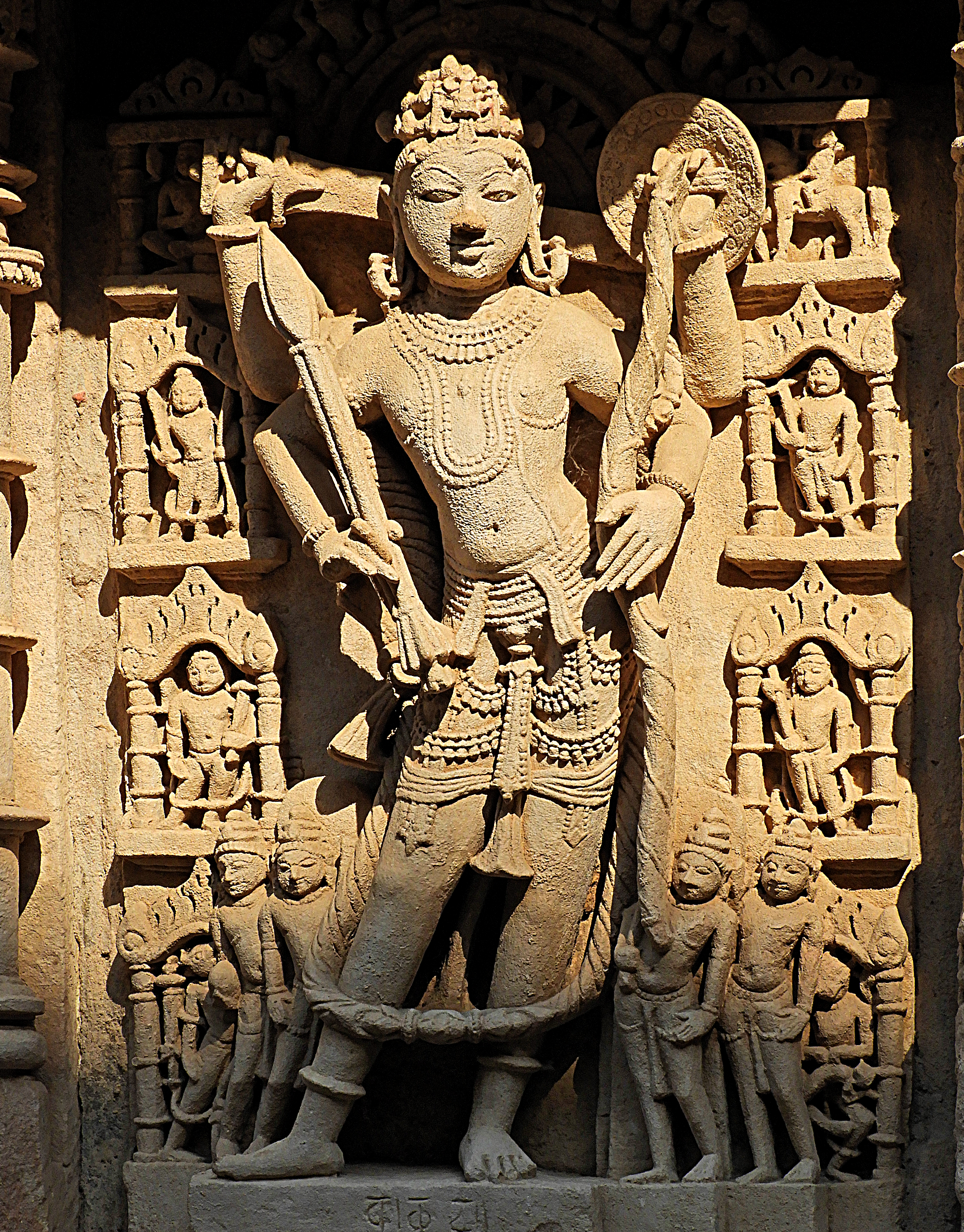
Rama as the four-armed Vishnu wielding the bow Sharanga, Gujarat

Sharnga (Sanskrit: शार्ङ्ग, romanized: Śārṅga) also spelled as Saranga or Sharanga, is the celestial bow of the Hindu god Vishnu, primarily associated with his avatar of Rama. In South India, the Sharanga is also simply known as the Kodanda, literally meaning bow. Rama is often praised as Kodandapani, the holder of the Kodanda. The attribute of the bow is also mentioned in the Vishnu Sahasranama.

== Legends ==
The Sharanga is notable for its employment by a number of the Dashavatara, the avatars of Vishnu: Parashurama, Rama, and Krishna. Rama carries the bow in his epic and is also mentioned to bear it in the Padma Purana. The bow is offered to him by Parashurama, the previous incarnation of Vishnu. In the Ramayana, Parashurama, the Brahmin warrior who is famously massacred Kshatriyas, regales the tale of the bow. Vishvakarma creates the bows of Pinaka and Sharanga to settle the question of the superiority of the deities Vishnu and Shiva. Shiva is victorious, and Shiva presents his bow to the king of Mithila. Vishnu's bow is passed down to Richika, who presented it to Jamadagni, Parashurama's father, the latter claiming it after his father's assassination. Parashurama challenges Rama to fight him if the latter is able to string the bow. When the prince achieves this, the warrior admits defeat and retires to his abode.

In a legend also featured in the Padma Purana, a number of great sages debate regarding the deity most worthy of their obeisance. They dispatch Bhrigu to the abodes of first Shiva, then Brahma, and finally Vishnu. Bhrigu finds that Shiva is Spending time with Parvati, Brahma is busy with the aspects of rajas, and Vishnu sleeping on Shesha, Lakshmi his consort rubbed his feet. When a furious Bhrigu kicks Vishnu on his chest, the latter greets the sage with warmth and considers himself to be blessed by the touch of his feet. Bhrigu hails Vishnu as the holder of the Sharanga as he sings his praises.

In some versions of Krishna's battle with Narakasura, his second queen consort, Satyabhama, takes his bow to slay the asura.

== In Literature ==
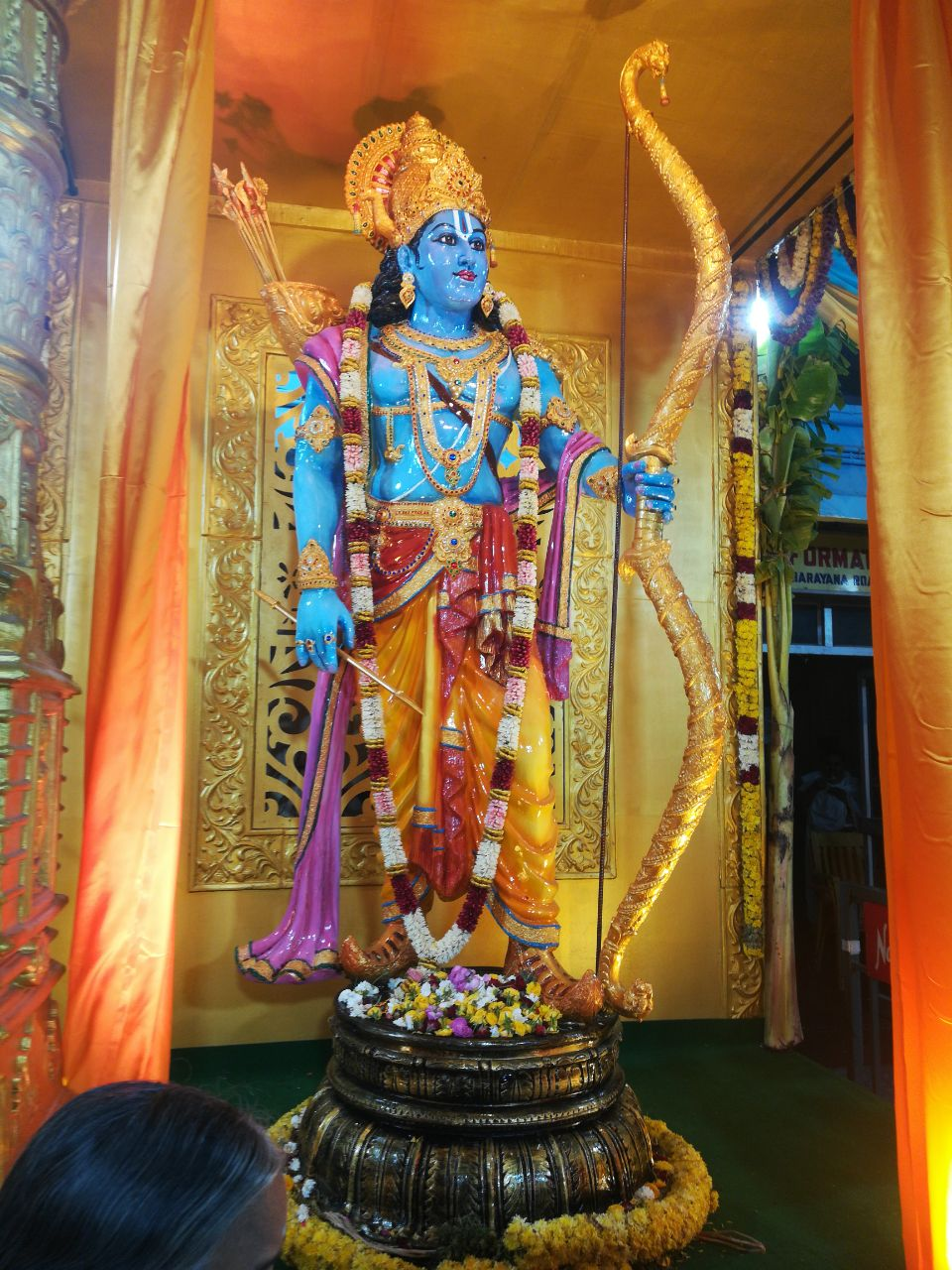
Statue of Rama holding the Sharanga (Kodhanda) bow at the TTD Temple in Chennai

In the Mahabharata, Yudhishthira praises Krishna as the wielder of the bow Sharanga. In the Vishnu Purana, Krishna employs the bow to defeat Jarasandha. Sharanga, the mace Kaumodaki and two quivers with infinite arrows appear from the heavens to aid Krishna; similarly the plough and the club Sounanda appear for Krishna's brother Balarama. Together, the brothers defeat Jarasandha. In the Padma Purana, Vishnu uses the bow to combat Jalandhara. In the same scripture, Krishna is said to shoot from the Sharanga during his elopement with his chief consort, Rukmini; He defeats Rukmini's brother Rukmi, shattering his foe's chariot and banner with arrows. Later, Krishna also destroyed Rukmi's sword with arrows. Krishna humiliates Rukmi by binding him and shaving his head.

== In popular culture ==
- The Sarangapani temple at Kumbakonam takes its name partly from the bow.
- A kaiju in Godzilla: Singular Point is named Sharanga (サルンガ or Salunga) due to its emergence in India and the bow-like shape on its head.
- The sharanga is an available weapon in the video games Raji: An Ancient Epic, where it is depicted as a compound bow, and in Hades where it is available as a variant of Zagreus' bow.
- Mirai (2025 film), the main plot focuses on a superweapon called Mirai which is revealed as kodanda of Lord Rama.
- The online video game War Robots (released as Walking War Robots by Pixonic in 2014) introduced a 'Titan' called Sharanga in 2021. It has three 'Alpha' hardpoints, mounted high, and relatively good footspeed, though it lacks the added defenses of many newer Titans.

== See also ==
- Pinaka
- Gandiva
- Vijaya
