= T. Nagar Padmavathi Temple =

Hindu temple in Chennai district, Tamil Nadu, India

- Padmavathi Temple, T. Nagar, Chennai

Religion
- Affiliation: Hinduism
- District: Chennai
- Deity: Padmavathi
- Festivals: Varalakshmi Vratam, Vasanthotsavam, Pavithrotsavam, Theppotsavam, Brahmotsava, Karthika Deepam, Panchami Theertham, Navaratri

Location
- Location: Gopathi Narayanaswamy Road, T. Nagar
- State: Tamil Nadu
- Country: India
- Interactive map of T. Nagar Padmavathi Temple
- Coordinates: 13.0452°N 80.2415°E

Architecture
- Type: Dravidian architecture
- Completed

Specifications
- Temple: One
- Elevation: 29.87 m (98 ft)

Padmavathi Temple is a Lakshmi temple situated on Gopathi Narayanaswamy (G. N. Chetty) Road at T. Nagar in Chennai district of Tamil Nadu state in India.

== Location ==
Padmavathi temple is located with the coordinates of (13.0452°N 80.2415°E) at T. Nagar, Chennai.

T. Nagar Padmavathi Temple (Chennai)

== Speciality ==
This is the first temple constructed in the country by TTD (Tirumala Tirupati Devasthanams) which is dedicated to a goddess exclusively for Padmavathi (the divine consort of Venkateswara).

This is the second temple in Chennai built by TTD while the first one was dedicated to lord Venkateswara, constructed near to this temple.

== Temple land donation ==
The land for this temple was donated by an yesteryear's cine actress viz., Kanchana and her sister, who are ardent devotees of lord Venkateswara.

== Foundation ==
The foundation stone laying ceremony for constructing the temple, in a piece of land of about 6 ground (34 cents), was organised on 13 February 2021 by TTD. Kanchi seer Vijayendra Saraswati Swamigal performed the Bhoomi puja.

== Construction ==
The temple is constructed at a cost of about ₹10 crore and the temple and the tower are built in such a way that they appear similar to the goddess Padmavathi temple at Tiruchanur (Alamelu Mangapuram) in Tirupati.

== Mahakumbhabhishekam ==
The Mahakumbhabhishekam of the temple was ceremoniously performed on 17 March 2023 at its new temple complex at G. N. Chetty Road, T. Nagar, Chennai, by the TTD.
