= Agartala Smart City =

Urban renewal project in India

The Agartala Smart City Limited (ASCL) is a project part of the Smart Cities Mission in 2015 made to citizen friendly and sustainable quality of life in Agartala better. The organization focuses on implementing Smart Energy meter, Smart Water, Smart Environment, Smart Mobility and Smart Technology. Gugulavath Sharath Nayak, an IAS officer, is the current CEO of the Project.

The project has received ₹541.04 crores in investment for various infrastructure projects.

== Smart water ==
- Lake Restoration - Restoring and beautification of 25 water bodies, including building walkways, and creating parks around the lakes.

== See also ==
- Smart City
