= The Long Tank, Madras =

Lake in Madras, India

The Long Tank was a natural lake which was situated on the western frontier of the city Madras, India. Comprising two sections - the Mylapore Tank to the south and a feeder lake Nungambakkam Tank to the north, it extended for about five miles from Sterling Road in the north to the suburb of Saidapet in the south. About a mile in width, it formed the boundary of Madras city as well as the district till 1921.

Much of the Mylapore Tank was filled up in the 1920s to create the planned township of T. Nagar. The Nungambakkam Tank was filled up in 1971 and the memorial Valluvar Kottam constructed on the reclaimed land.
