= Kannammapet =

Area of Chennai, India

Coordinates: 13.031569°N 80.228863°E

Kannammapet is an area in the city of Chennai, India. It forms a part of the neighbourhood of T. Nagar. It houses one of the city's principal crematoriums. In 2003, an eco-friendly electric furnace was installed at the crematorium.
