= Chennai Smart City =

Urban renewal project in India

Chennai Smart City Limited (CSCL) is a project, part of the Smart Cities Mission in 2015 in India. This project was made to provide smart solutions in making quality of life in Chennai better. The organization focuses on implementing Smart Energy, Smart Water, Smart Environment, Smart Mobility and Smart Technology. The project's CEO is Raj Cherubal who holds a degree in Physics and Nuclear Engineering.

The project has received ₹3,444 crores ($440 Million) in investment for various infrastructure projects.

== Smart Energy ==
The CSCL has worked to improving energy consumption and production by implementing:

- Smart Meters - These meters help users keep track of their energy consumption in real time and receive updates on bills and tariffs. Over 100 000 meters have been installed in areas similar to T Nagar.
- Energy Projects - The Greater Chennai Corporation have start many energy efficient projects in the city, such as solar street lights and Solar Water Heating Systems. These projects reduce green house emissions.
- GHG Emissions Inventory - This will focus on sectors such as waste, energy, and transport. This will help develop strong climate action strategies.
- Renewable Energy Policies - Government Of Tamil Nadu has approved a handful of renewable energy policies targeting 20 000 MW by 2030.

== Smart Water ==
The Smart Water Enterprise in the CSCL pays attention to integrated water, wastewater, and stormwater management systems. Some characteristic of these is:

- Electromagnetic Flow Meters - These meters will ensure efficient water consumption and reduce non-avenue through leaks. By 2025-2026, 90% of businesses and residential building will be equipped with these meters.
- Lake Restoration - Restoring and beautification of 57 water bodies are to expand Chennai's water holding capacity and groundwater renewal. Includes desilting, building walkways, and creating parks around the lakes.
- City of 1000 Tanks - The project focuses on reducing flooding, water scarcity, and pollution.The project is heavily involved in creating a Water Balance Model across the city and increasing groundwater reserves.

== Smart Environment ==
The Smart Environment venture in the CSCL project plans to make Chennai more sustainable, inclusive, and efficient by upgrading technology and solutions. This will include:

- Green Projects - TGCC has initiated various green projects such as the Miyawaki Urban Forests, Vertical farms and green traffic parks.

== Smart Mobility ==
The Smart Environment venture in the CSCL project plans to make Chennai more sustainable, inclusive, and efficient by upgrading technology and solutions. This will include:

- Bicycle Lanes - The lanes are 17 Kilometers in length across areas such as T Nagar, Velachery and Besant Nagar.
- Urban Green Spaces - The CSCL implemented Vertical Gardens, Traffic Islands, Open Spaces, Restoration of water bodies and greener areas.
- Adaptive Traffic Control System - This system changes traffic signal timings based on live traffic conditions to improve traffic and lower delays.
- GPS-based Vehicle Tracking - This network tracks the location of public transport vehicles, showing real-time information to passengers and traffic managers.
- Electronic Ticketing Systems - Placed in public transport to make cashless payments easier and improve efficiency.
- Automatic Number Plate Recognition (ANPR) - The ANPR has over 200 cameras at 50 locations to detect traffic violations and stolen cars.

== See also ==
- Smart city
