= Sri Venkateswara Swamy Temple, T. Nagar =

Perumal temple in Chennai district, Tamil Nadu, India

- Sri Venkateswara Swamy Temple, T. Nagar, Chennai, Tamil Nadu

Religion
- Affiliation: Hinduism
- District: Chennai
- Deity: Venkateswara and Alamelu Manga

Location
- Location: T. Nagar
- State: Tamil Nadu
- Country: India
- Interactive map of Sri Venkateswara Swamy Temple, T. Nagar
- Coordinates: 13.0357°N 80.2364°E

Architecture
- Elevation: 31.74 m (104 ft)

Sri Venkateswara Swamy Temple (Tamil: ஸ்ரீ வெங்கடேசுவர சுவாமி கோயில்) is a Hindu temple located inside the premises of TTD Information Center, Venkatanarayana Road, T. Nagar, Chennai, Tamil Nadu, India. Venkateswara and Alamelu Manga are worshipped in this temple, which also has images of Hayagriva, Varaha, Sri Rama, Sri Krishna, Andal, Charkratalwar, Ranganatha, Lakshmi, Sridevi and Bhumidevi, Brahma and Ramanujarcharya. Near to this temple is located a Lakshmi temple viz., Padmavathi Temple.

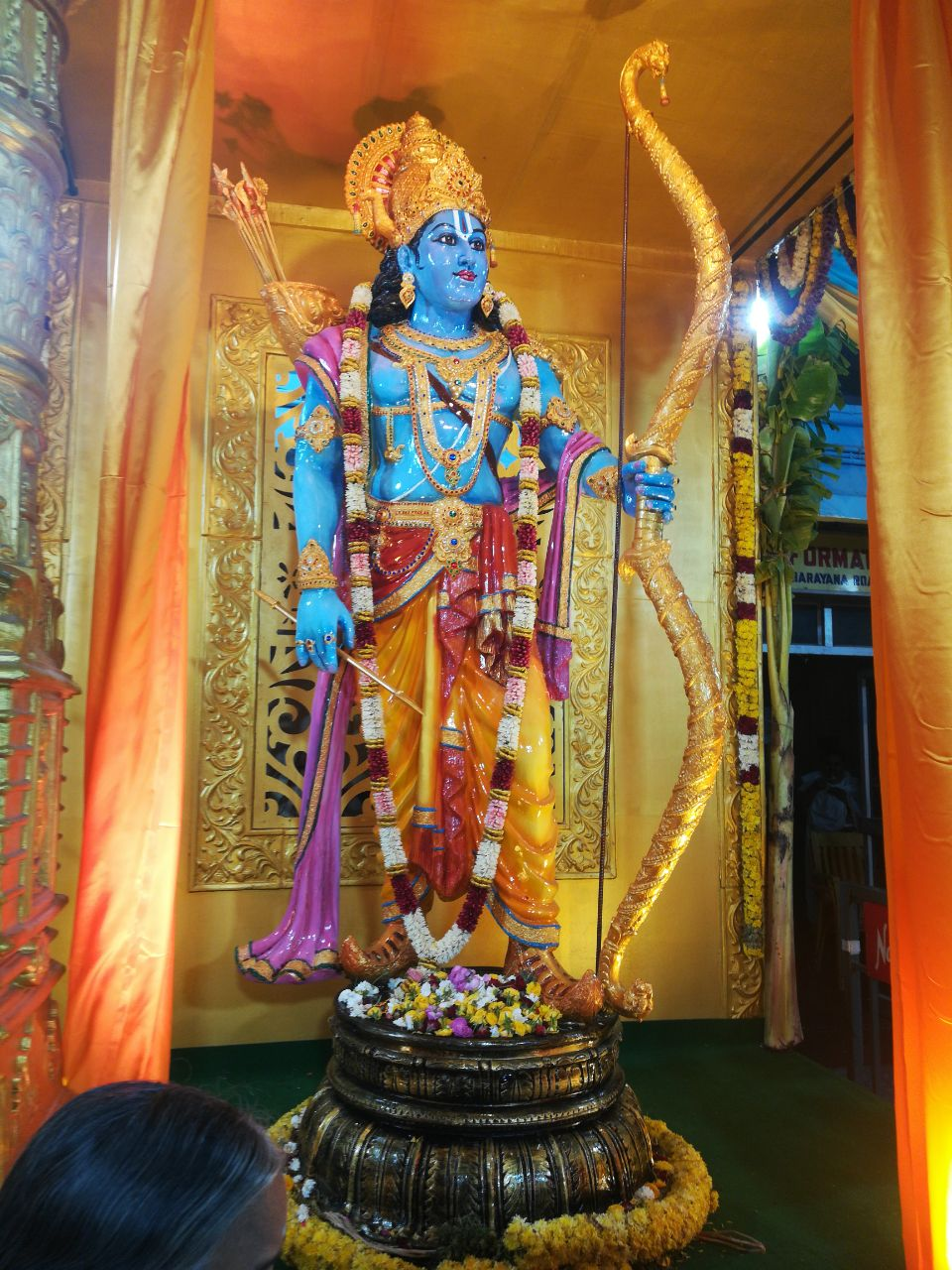
Statue of Rama holding the Sharanga (Kodhanda) bow, kept on display at the temple on the occasion of the inauguration of the Ayodhya Ram temple in January 2024

== See also ==
- Religion in Chennai
