= Pavithrotsavam =

Annual festival in a Hindu temple

Pavitrotsavam is an annual ritual in the Tirumala Venkateswara Temple, Andhra Pradesh.>
