= Saidapet railway station =

Railway station in Chennai, India

Saidapet Saidapettai
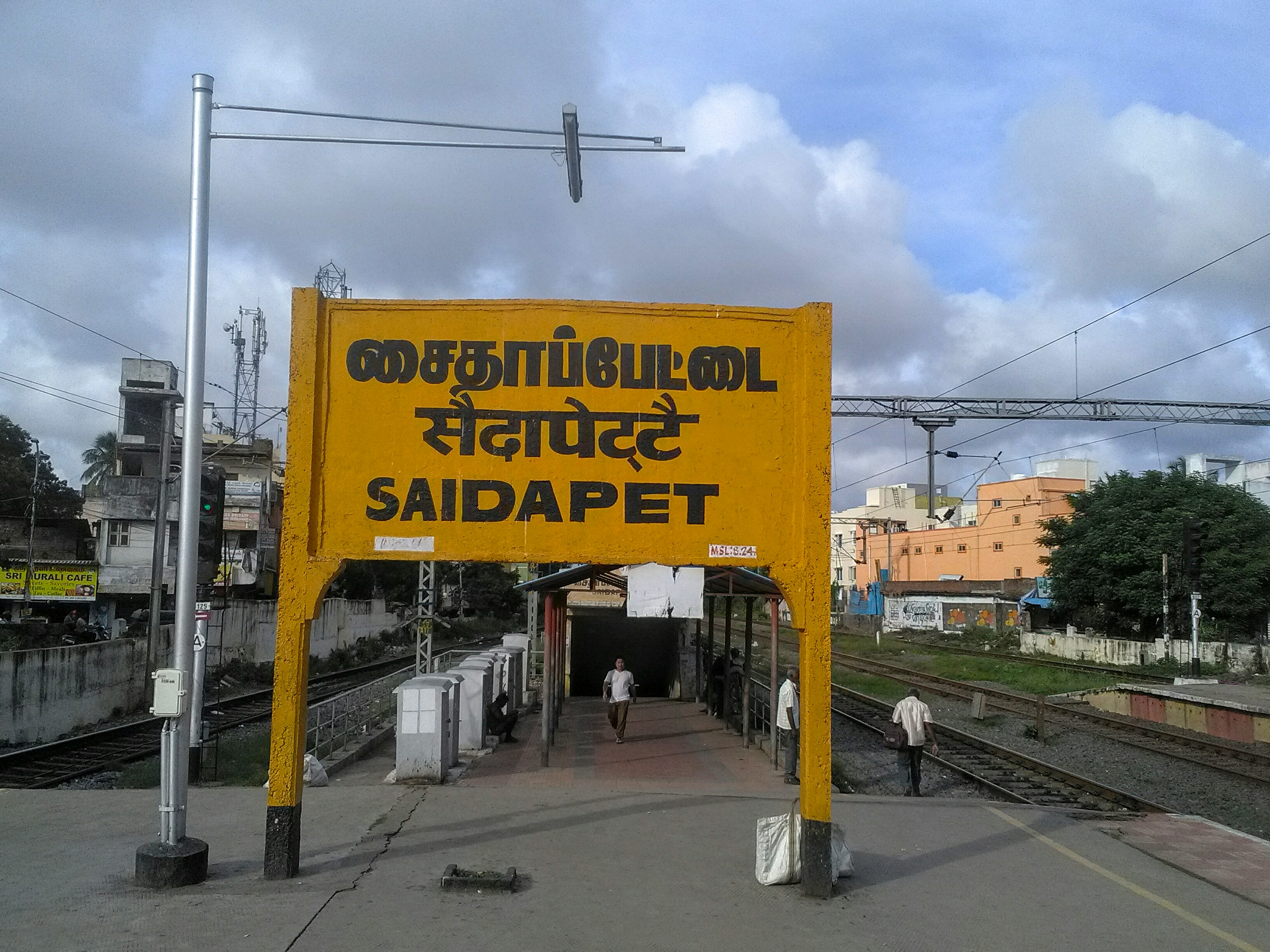

General information
- Location: Karaneeswarar Koil Street, Suriyammapet, Saidapet, Chennai, Tamil Nadu 600 015, India
- Coordinates: 13.02415°N 80.224183°E
- System: Indian Railways and Chennai Suburban Railway station
- Owner: Ministry of Railways, Indian Railways
- Lines: South and South West lines of Chennai Suburban Railway
- Tracks: 4

Construction
- Structure type: Standard on-ground station
- Parking: Available

Other information
- Station code: SP
- Fare zone: Southern Railways

History
- Opened: Early 1900s
- Electrified: 15 November 1931
- Former names: South Indian Railway

Services
Preceding station	Chennai Suburban	Following station
Mambalam towards Chennai Beach	South Line	Guindy towards Tambaram, Chengalpattu Junction or Villupuram Junction
Route map
Chennai Beach — Villupuram
Location

Saidapet railway station is one of the railway stations of the Chennai Beach–Chengelpet section of the Chennai Suburban Railway Network. It serves the neighbourhoods of Saidapet and Little Mount. It is situated about 12 km (7.5 mi) from Chennai Beach, and has an elevation of 10 m (33 ft) above sea level.

== History ==
Saidapet railway station was electrified on 15 November 1931. The section was converted to 25 kV AC traction on 15 January 1967.

== The station ==
=== Platforms ===
There are a total of 4 platforms and 4 tracks. The platforms are connected by foot overbridge. These platforms are built to accumulate 24 coaches express train. The platforms are equipped with modern facility like display board of arrival and departure of trains.

=== Station layout ===
G	Street level	Exit/Entrance & ticket counter
P1	FOB, Side platform | Doors will open on the left
P1	Platform 1	Towards → Chennai Beach; Next Station: Mambalam
P1	FOB, Island platform | P1 Doors will open on the left/right | P2 Doors will open on the right
P1	Platform 2	Towards ← Tambaram / Chengalpattu Jn / Villuppuram Jn; Next Station: Guindy
P1	Platform 3	Towards → Chennai Egmore
P1	FOB, Island platform | P3 and P4 | (Express Line)
P1	Platform 4	Towards ← Chengalpattu Junction
P1

== See also ==
- Chennai Suburban Railway
- Railway stations in Chennai
