= Smart Cities Mission =

Indian government plan for urban development

- Country: India
- Prime Minister(s): Narendra Modi
- Ministry: Ministry of Urban Development
- Key people: Manohar Lal Khattar, Minister of Housing and Urban Affairs; Roopa Mishra (Joint Secretary & Mission Director)
- Launched: 25 June 2015; 11 years ago
- Closed: 31 March 2025; 18 months ago
- Funding: ₹2,039.79 billion (US$21 billion)
- Website: smartcities.gov.in

Smart Cities Mission is an urban renewal and retrofitting program by the Government of India with the mission to develop smart cities across the country, making them citizen-friendly and sustainable. The Union Ministry of Urban Development was responsible for implementing the mission in collaboration with the state governments of the respective cities. In 2017, the ministry was merged with the ministry of housing and urban poverty alleviation to form the Ministry of Housing and Urban Affairs.

The mission was planned to include 100 cities, with an initial project completion deadline of 2019, later revised to 2023. As of January 2025, 7,479 out of a total of 8,058 tendered projects had been completed, utilizing ₹1,500.05 billion (US$16 billion) of the total allocated amount of ₹1,643.68 billion (US$17 billion). The project was officially shut down on 31 March 2025.

== Description ==
Smart Cities Mission envisions developing areas within selected cities in the country as model areas based on an area development plan, which is expected to have a rub-off effect on other parts of the city and nearby cities and towns. Cities will be selected based on the Smart Cities challenge, where cities will compete in a countrywide competition to obtain the benefits from this mission. The mission aims to provide financial assistance and promote sustainable urban development through selected cities. The Ministry of Urban Development used a competition-based method as a means for selecting cities for funding. The state governments were asked to nominate potential cities with the overall count across India limited to 100. A hundred cities have been selected so far to be upgraded as part of the Smart Cities Mission. Each city will create a Special Purpose Vehicle (SPV) headed by a CEO to implement the projects under mission.

== History ==
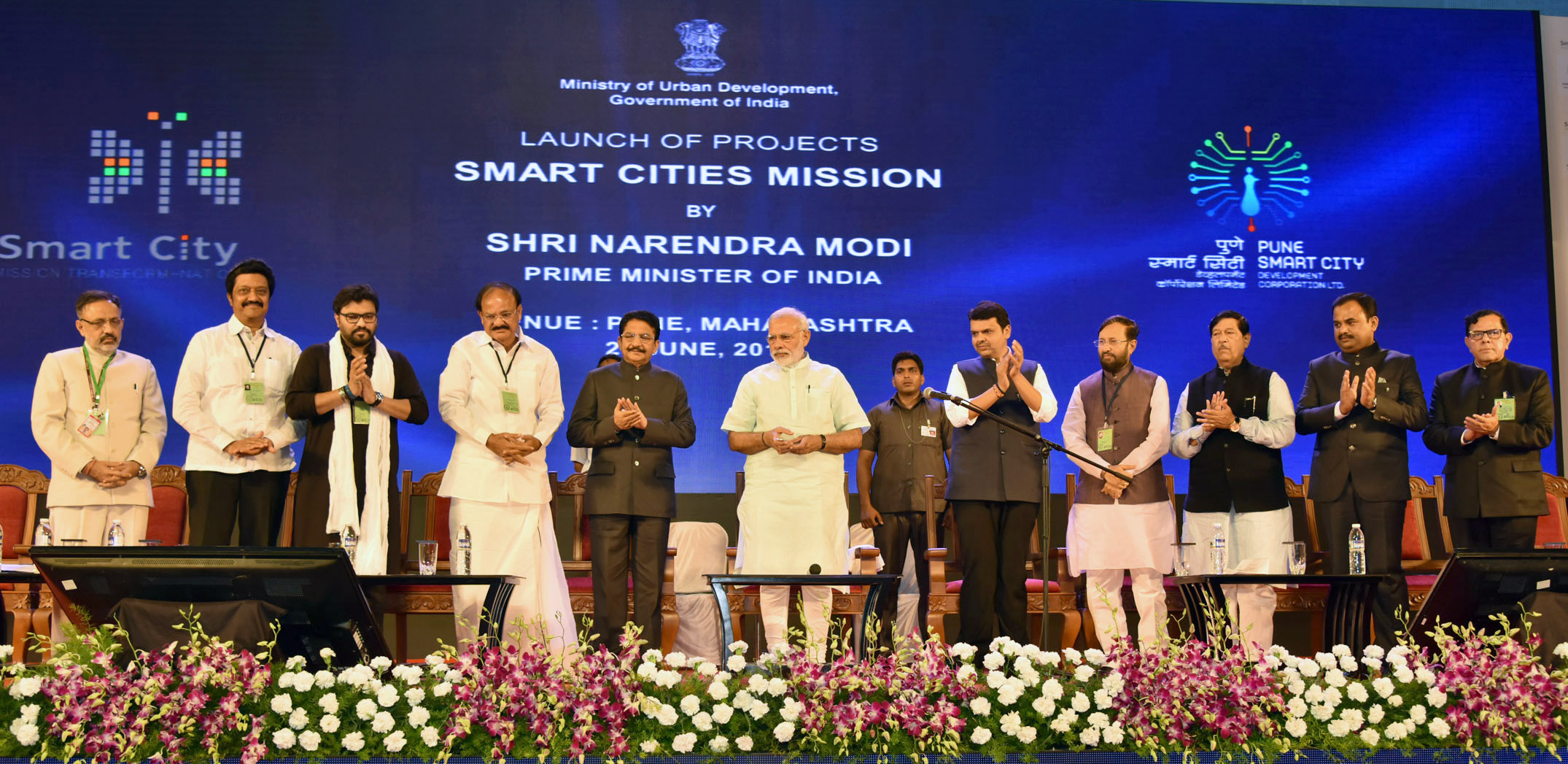
Prime Minister Narendra Modi at the launch of Smart Cities Mission in 2015

The mission was launched by Prime Minister Narendra Modi on 25 June 2015. In the 2015 Union budget of India, ₹20.2 billion (US$210 million) was allocated for the smart cities mission. The mission was further allocated ₹32.15 billion (US$330 million) in the 2016, ₹40 billion (US$420 million) in 2017, ₹61.69 billion (US$640 million) in 2018, ₹64.5 billion (US$670 million) in 2019, ₹61.36 billion (US$640 million) in 2020 and ₹61.18 billion (US$640 million) in the 2021. The project was extended and was allocated ₹141 billion (US$1.5 billion) in the 2023 Union budget of India and a further ₹160 billion (US$1.7 billion) in the 2023 Union budget of India. As of September 2023, a total of 7,960 projects worth ₹1,714.32 billion (US$18 billion) crore were tendered. As of January 2025, 7,479 out of a total of 8,058 tendered projects have been completed, utilizing ₹1,500.05 billion (US$16 billion) of the total allocated amount of ₹1,643.68 billion (US$17 billion). The project was officially shut down on 31 March 2025.

== List of cities ==
In 2015, 98 cities were nominated for the smart cities challenge, based on a state-level competition. A hundred cities were supposed to be nominated but Jammu and Kashmir and Uttar Pradesh did not use one of their allotted slots. All the participating cities from West Bengal, along with Mumbai and Navi Mumbai from Maharashtra, withdrew their nominations.

List of nominated cities (2016)
State/UT	Count	Cities
Uttar Pradesh	13	Agra, Aligarh, Bareilly, Gorakhpur, Jhansi, Kanpur, Lucknow, Meerut, Moradabad, Prayagraj, Rampur, Raebareli, Saharanpur, Varanasi
Tamil Nadu	12	Chennai, Coimbatore, Dindigul, Erode, Madurai, Salem, Thanjavur, Thoothukudi, Tiruchirappalli, Tirunelveli, Tiruppur, Vellore
Maharashtra	8	Amravati, Aurangabad, Kalyan-Dombivali, Nagpur, Nashik, Pune, Solapur, Thane,
Karnataka	7	Belagavi, Bengaluru, Davanagere, Hubbali-Dharwad, Mangaluru, Shimoga, Tumakuru,
Madhya Pradesh	7	Indore, Jabalpur, Bhopal, Gwalior, Sagar, Satna, Ujjain,
Gujarat	6	Ahmedabad, Dahod, Gandhinagar, Rajkot, Surat, Vadodara
Andhra Pradesh	4	Amaravati, Kakinada, Tirupati, Visakhapatnam
Bihar	4	Bhagalpur, Biharsharif, Muzaffarpur, Patna
Rajasthan	4	Ajmer, Jaipur, Kota, Udaipur
Chhattisgarh	3	Bilaspur, Naya Raipur, Raipur
Punjab	3	Amritsar, Jalandhar, Ludhiana
Haryana	2	Faridabad, Karnal
Kerala	2	Kochi, Thiruvananthapuram
Odisha	2	Bhubaneshwar, Rourkela
Sikkim	2	Gangtok, Namchi
Telangana	2	Karimnagar, Warangal
Arunachal Pradesh	1	Pasighat
Assam	1	Guwahati
Goa	1	Panaji
Himachal Pradesh	1	Dharamshala
Jharkhand	1	Ranchi
Manipur	1	Imphal
Meghalaya	1	Shillong
Mizoram	1	Aizawl
Nagaland	1	Kohima
Tripura	1	Agartala
Uttarakhand	1	Dehradun
Andaman and Nicobar Islands	1	Port Blair
Chandigarh	1	Chandigarh
Dadra and Nagar Haveli	1	Silvassa
Daman and Diu	1	Diu
Delhi	1	New Delhi
Jammu and Kashmir	1	Srinagar
Lakshadweep	1	Kavaratti
Puducherry	1	Oulgaret

=== Selected cities ===
On 28 January 2016, a batch of 20 cities known as "lighthouse cities" were selected in the first round of the All India City Challenge competition for which an assistance of ₹200 crore (US$21 million) each during the first year followed by ₹100 crore (US$10 million) per year during the next three years was announced. 13 cities were added as an extension in May 2016. 27 cities were added in September 2016, 30 in June 2017, nine in January 2018 and one in June 2018.

Smart cities

List of selected cities
Phase	Year	Count	Cities
Phase I	January 2016	20	Bhubaneswar, Pune, Jaipur, Surat, Kochi, Ahmedabad, Jabalpur, Visakhapatnam, Solapur, Davangere, Indore, New Delhi, Coimbatore, Kakinada, Belagavi, Udaipur, Guwahati, Chennai, Ludhiana, Bhopal
Phase I (Ext.)	May 2016	13	Chandigarh, Bhagalpur, Faridabad, Lucknow, Raipur, Ranchi, Dharamasala, Warangal, Panaji, Agartala, Imphal, Port Blair, New Town Kolkata
Phase II	September 2016	27	Amritsar, Kalyan, Ujjain, Tirupati, Nagpur, Mangalore, Vellore, Thane, Gwalior, Agra, Nashik, Rourkela, Kanpur, Madurai, Tumakuru, Kota, Thanjavur, Namchi, Jalandhar, Shimoga, Salem, Ajmer, Varanasi, Kohima, Hubli-Dharwad, Aurangabad, Vadodara
Phase III	June 2017	30	Thiruvananthapuram, Naya Raipur, Rajkot, Amaravati, Patna, Karimnagar, Muzaffarpur, Puducherry, Gandhinagar, Srinagar, Sagar, Karnal, Satna, Bengaluru, Shimla, Dehradun, Jhansi, Pimpri-Chinchwad, Bilaspur, Pasighat, Jammu, Dahod, Thoothukudi, Tiruchirappalli, Tirunelveli, Tiruppur, Aizawl, Prayagraj, Aligarh, Gangtok
Phase IV	January 2018	10	Erode, Saharanpur, Moradabad, Bareilly, Itanagar, Silvassa, Diu, Kavaratti, Bihar Sharif
Phase IV (Ext.)	June 2018	1	Shillong

== Challenges and criticism ==
The programme has faced delays in the selection of cities, and in the execution of the projects. Originally envisaged for completion by 2020, the project deadline was extended by three years, as the list of cities were finalised only in 2018. As of 2019, of the ₹166 billion (US$1.7 billion) allocated to the mission, only 21% had been spent. The Comptroller and Auditor General (CAG) found that of 44 initially approved projects in Patna, 29 had not started by October 2022 due to issues such as non-availability of land, overlapping responsibilities, and feasibility concerns. A 2021 found that about 49% of the projects across the cities for which work orders had been issued remained incomplete. By 2025, only 18 out of the 100 cities had declared full completion of all planned projects.

The CAG report cited deficient financial administration, including the inclusion of unfeasible projects, diversion of funds to unapproved activities, and submission of incorrect utilisation certificates as issues. Inadequate public consultation, and lack of coordination between agencies were cited by the public as reasons for the delay. A 2025 report indicated that the smart city projects neglected ecological planning, prioritising aesthetic or technological infrastructure over environmental resilience, with reported instances of encroachment on wetlands, destruction of tree cover, and degradation of public commons. Rights groups have pointed out that low-income groups and informal settlements were often left out of planning and benefit-sharing processes, with documented cases of displacement or threats of eviction linked to the development under the project in various cities.

Of the projects completed, there were complaints from local residents on poor coordination and mismatch between what was planned and the end output. In Thiruvananthapuram, a newly constructed road worth ₹330 million (US$3.4 million) had to be dug up shortly after inauguration to fix a sewage leak, raising concerns about the planning and sustenance of the projects. In Nagpur, nearly half of the 3,686 CCTV cameras installed under the project were non-functional within a year due to poor maintenance.
