= Mambalam railway station =

Railway station in Chennai, India

Mambalam
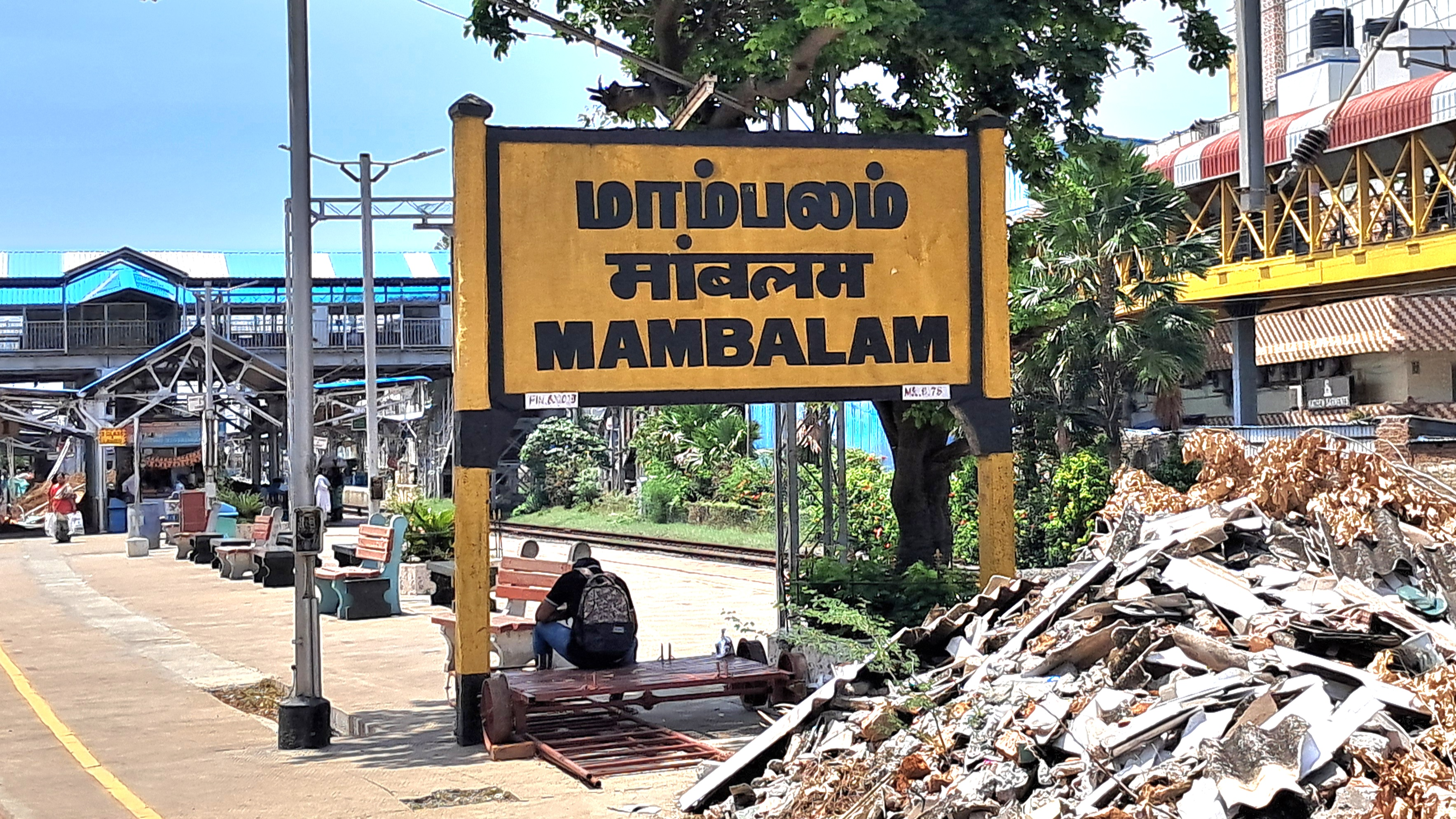
- Mambalam railway station as of June 2025

General information
- Location: Mambalam, Chennai, Tamil Nadu, India
- Coordinates: 13°2′14″N 80°13′39″E
- System: Indian Railways and Chennai Suburban Railway station
- Owner: Ministry of Railways, Indian Railways
- Lines: South and South West lines of Chennai Suburban Railway
- Platforms: 4 (2 island platforms)
- Tracks: 4

Construction
- Structure type: Standard on-ground station
- Parking: Available

Other information
- Status: Active
- Station code: MBM
- Fare zone: Southern Railways

History
- Opened: 1911
- Electrified: 15 November 1931
- Former names: South Indian Railway

Services
Preceding station	Chennai Suburban	Following station
Kodambakkam towards Chennai Beach	South Line	Saidapet towards Tambaram, Chengalpattu Junction or Villupuram Junction
Route map
Chennai Beach — Villupuram
Location

Mambalam Railway Station (station code: MBM) is an NSG–3 category Indian railway station in Chennai railway division of Southern Railway zone. It is one of the railway stations in Chennai, India, on the Chennai Beach–Chengelpet section of the Chennai Suburban Railway Network. It is situated in the neighbourhoods of West Mambalam and T. Nagar, about 11 km (6.8 mi) from Chennai Beach, and has an elevation of 13 m (43 ft) above sea level.

With a patronage of 200,000 passengers a day, Mambalam railway station is one of the busiest stations in the city.

The Mambalam railway line divides the Mambalam area into West Mambalam and East Mambalam, the latter now being renamed as Tyagaraya Nagar.

== History ==
Mambalam railway station was constructed when the suburban railway service connecting Madras Egmore with Kanchipuram was opened in 1911. The suburban service between Madras Beach and Tambaram was inaugurated on 11 May 1931 and in this regard, two railway tracks were electrified by 15 November 1931. The section was converted to 25 kV AC traction on 15 January 1967.

== Facilities ==
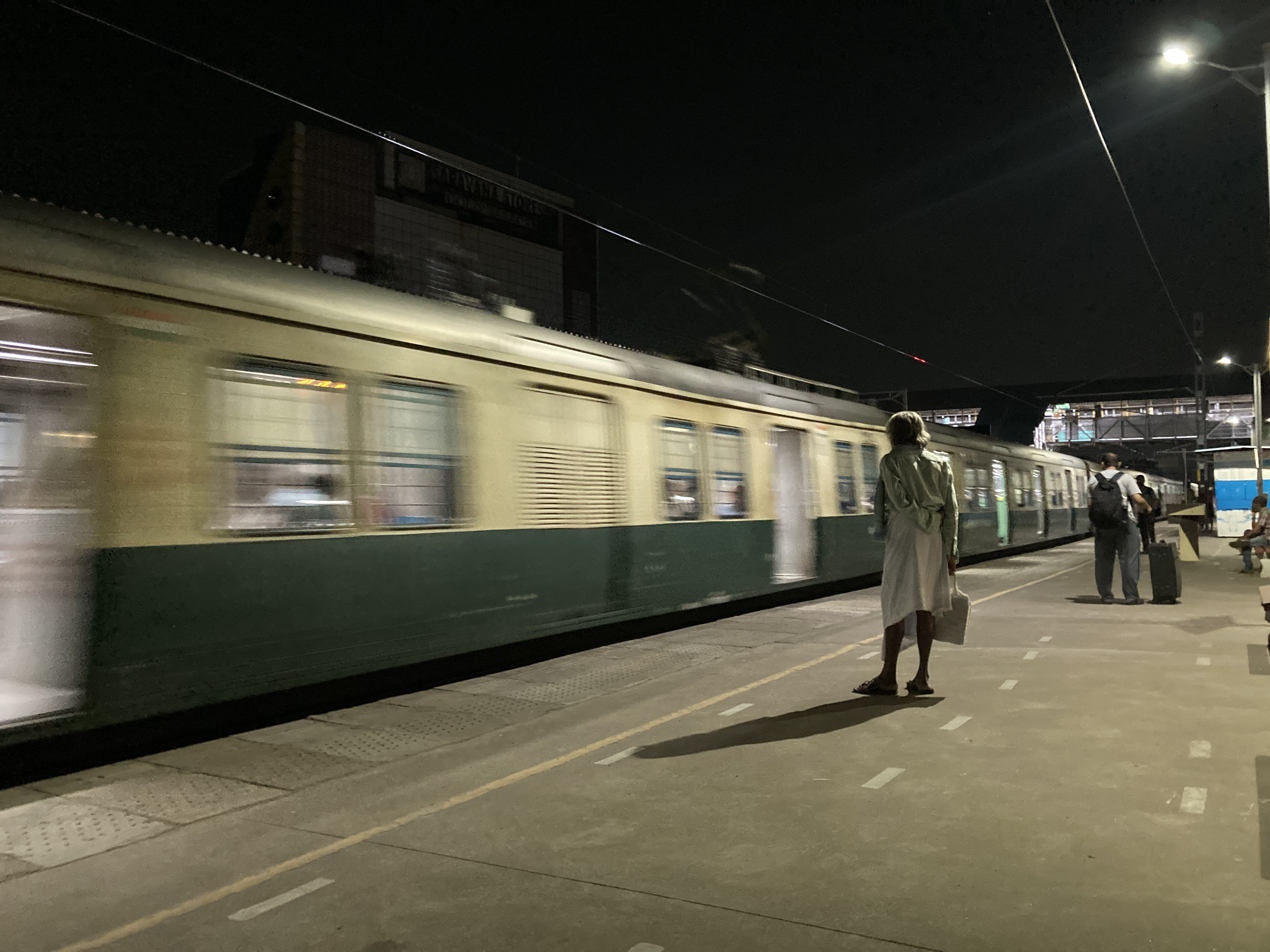
A Suburban train arrives at Mambalam Railway Station.

About nineteen express and passenger trains pass through the station.

Mambalam railway station is one of the busiest stations in the city and handles over 200,000 passenger daily, with more than 1,000 passengers an hour. The parking lot at the station has a capacity to accommodate around 500 to 600 two-wheelers and around 200 bicycles.

The station has a footbridge descending into Ranganathan Street at the southern end of the station. However, following a demand, a second footbridge was built in 2014 at the northern end.

The passenger reservation system (PRS) centre at the station caters to residents of the neighbourhoods including T. Nagar, West Mambalam, Kodambakkam, and Vadapalani. It is a major railway ticket-booking centre after Moore Market Complex and Tambaram. It has ten counters for booking tickets and another counter for enquiries, and sells around 2,500 tickets daily.

== The station ==
=== Platforms ===
There are a total of 4 platforms and 4 tracks. The platforms are connected by foot overbridge. These platforms are built to accumulate 24 coaches express train. The platforms are equipped with modern facility like display board of arrival and departure of trains.

=== Station layout ===
G	Street level	Exit/Entrance & ticket counter
P1	FOB, Side platform | Doors will open on the left
P1	Platform 1	Towards → Chennai Beach; Next Station: Kodambakkam
P1	FOB, Island platform | P1 Doors will open on the left/right | P2 Doors will open on the right
P1	Platform 2	Towards ← Tambaram / Chengalpattu Jn / Villuppuram Jn; Next Station: Saidapet
P1	Platform 3	Towards → Chennai Egmore
P1	FOB, Island platform | P3 and P4 | (Express Line)
P1	Platform 4	Towards ← Chengalpattu Junction
P1

== Security ==
The station is covered by the ₹ 400-million Integrated Security Surveillance System (ISSS) project implemented in 2012. The project, implemented jointly by the Southern Railways and HCL Infosystems, includes installation of CCTV cameras that would record visuals around the clock and store the data for 30 days, with the footage transmitted and stored using an Internet Protocol system.

== Projects and development ==
It is one of the 73 stations in Tamil Nadu to be named for upgradation under Amrit Bharat Station Scheme of Indian Railways.

== See also ==
- Chennai Suburban Railway
- Railway stations in Chennai
