= Ranganathan Street =

Commercial street in T. Nagar, Chennai, India

Coordinates: 13.0371°N 80.22931°E

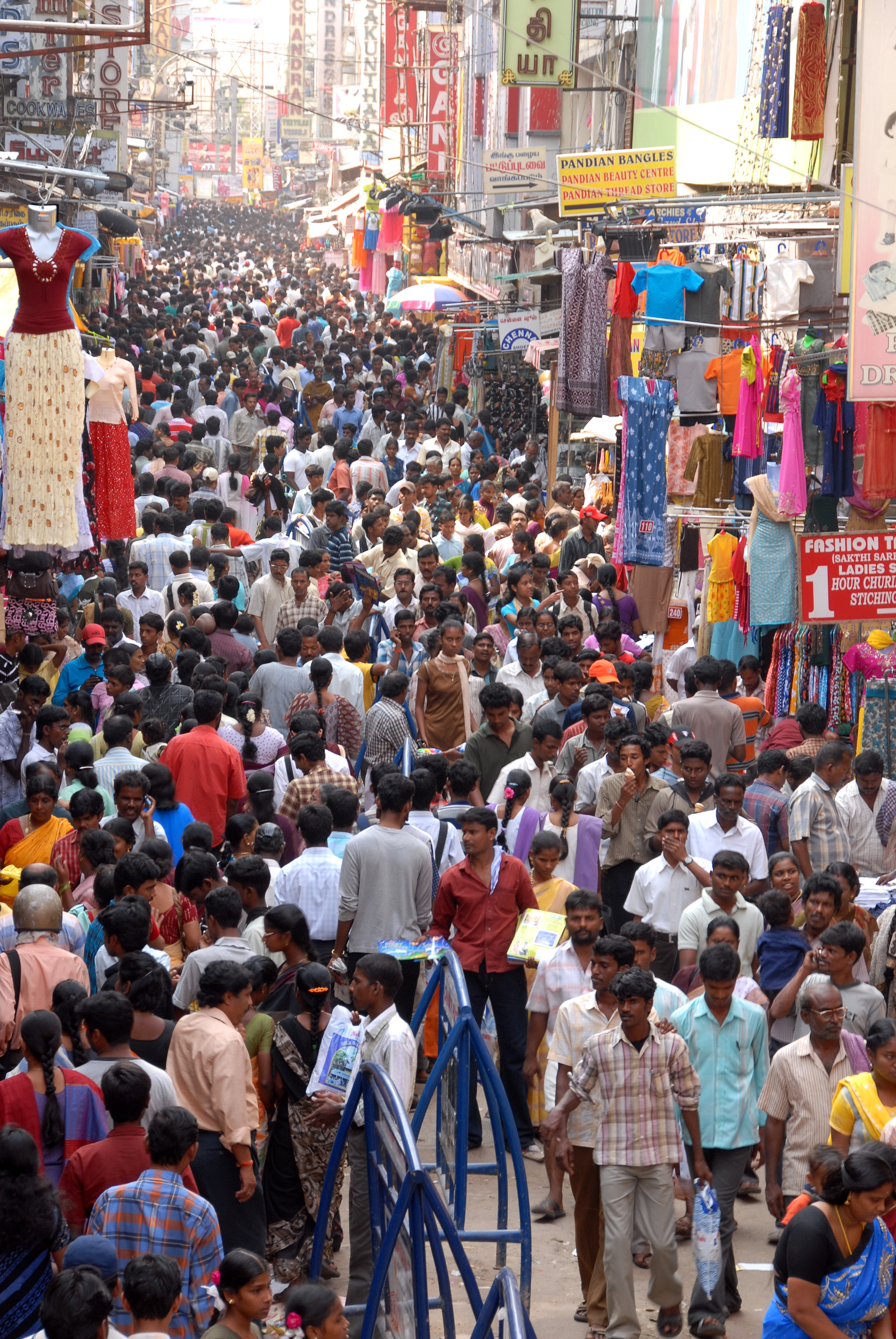
Ranganathan Street

Ranganathan Street is a major commercial street in the neighborhood of T. Nagar, located in Chennai, India. It is one of the most crowded streets in Chennai. The street houses several commercial establishments, primarily those involved in the clothing and jewelry industry. It has often been referred to as the most crowded street in Chennai.

== History ==
Ranganathan Street ought to have been named Rangaswamy Iyengar Street after the first resident of that street. It was the usual practice then to name streets after the first resident irrespective of their class, caste or contribution.

Tupil Rangaswamy Iyengar, a retired Civil Servant of the erstwhile Madras Presidency, built his house in early 1920s. When civil authorities approached him for his formal approval the gentleman requested it be named after Lord Ranganatha of Srirangam temple.

== General ==
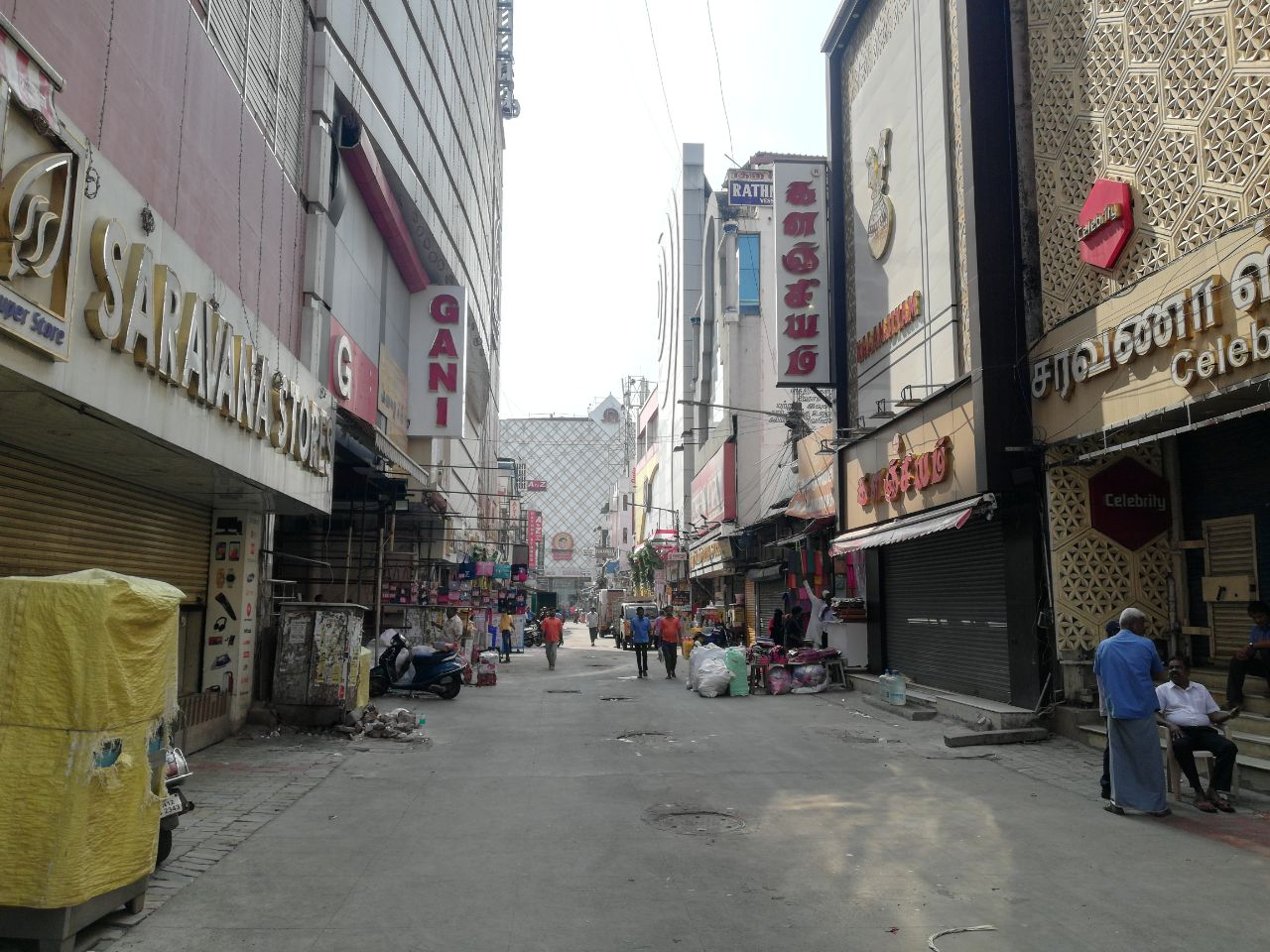
The street at early in the morning, April 2023

Usman Road is on one end of the street. At the other end is the Mambalam train station. On the street can be found many commercial establishments ranging from street hawkers selling safety pins to big stores selling gold jewelry. Many vegetable vendors also sell their wares on Ranganathan Street.

Throughout the year the street is full of people. Traditionally, it is busiest during Deepavali by nature of this street offering consumers the opportunity to purchase a variety of commodities. The most famous among the establishments on Ranganathan Street are the Saravana stores and Jeyachandran Textile and jewellery

== Commercial shops ==
Some of the commercial shops established in Ranganathan street include Saravana Stores, Jeyachandran Textile and Jewellery, Rathna Stores, and Textile India, among others. The street is a famous icon of T. Nagar and due to its proximity to Mambalam railway station, people from all parts of Chennai and Tamil Nadu flock to Ranganathan Street for shopping, especially during festive seasons.

== In popular culture ==
The street appears in various Tamil films, including Santosh Subramaniam (2008). In particular, the critically acclaimed 2010 film Angaadi Theru focuses on the bad working conditions in stores on the Ranganathan street.
