= T. Nagar =

Neighbourhood in Chennai district, Tamil Nadu, India

Thyagaraya Nagar T. Nagar
- Neighbourhood
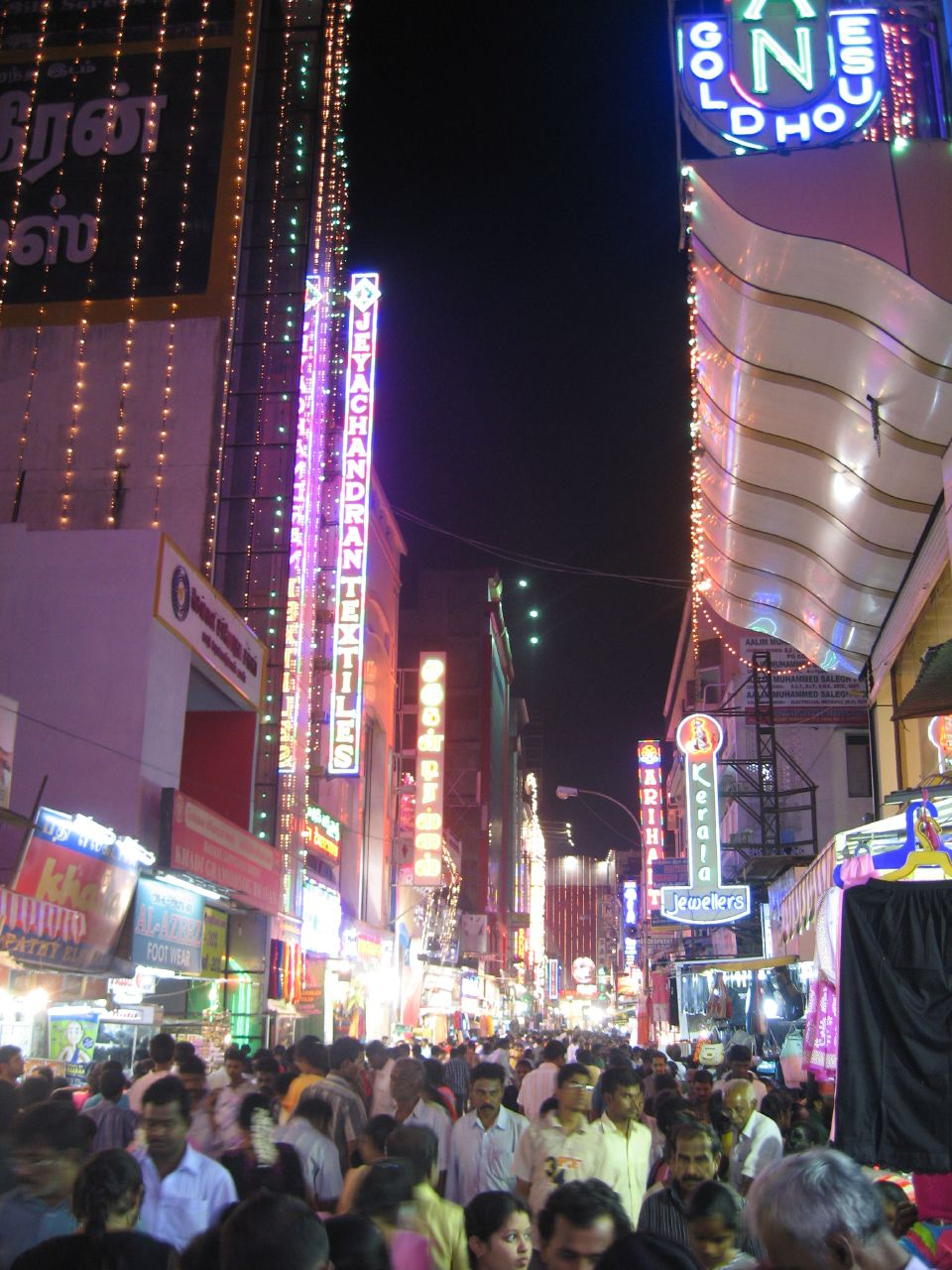
- Busy South Usman Road in T. Nagar

- T. Nagar, Chennai T. Nagar, Tamil Nadu T. Nagar, India
- Coordinates: 13.041800°N 80.234100°E
- Country: India
- State: Tamil Nadu
- Metro: Chennai

Languages
  - Official: Tamil
- Time zone: UTC+5:30 (IST)
- PIN: 600017
- Vehicle registration: TN-09
- Lok Sabha constituency: Chennai South
- Assembly constituency: Thiyagaraya Nagar

Theagaraya Nagar, popularly known by its abbreviated form T. Nagar, and historically as East Mambalam, is a busy shopping district of Chennai, Tamil Nadu, India. It is situated at a minimum distance of about 8 kilometres (5.0 miles) from kilometre zero of Chennai city and forms part of the Mambalam taluk of Chennai district. Largely comprising retail chains selling jewellery, readymade clothes, undergarments, footwear, housewares, toys and stationery on Ranganathan Street, Usman Road and Pondy Bazaar with Panagal Park at its centre, it is one of the busiest of its kind in Asia.

Originally covered by the Long Tank, a vast reservoir to the west of Madras city and part of the zamindari of Mambalam, T. Nagar had its origins in the Mambalam Town Planning Scheme conceived by the Madras Presidency government of the Raja of Panagal (1921-1925) for the draining out of the Long Tank and creation of a planned residential neighbourhood in the eastern part of the zamindari. Some of the iconic landmarks of T. Nagar including Panagal Park and the radial streets that were named after prominent city officials and politicians were laid out during this period. Named Theagaraya Nagar after Justice Party ideologue Sir P. Theagaraya Chetty and also commonly referred to as East Mambalam in its early days, T. Nagar became part of the Corporation of Madras in 1933. The neighbourhood underwent a change of character starting from the 1950s onwards when shops and commercial establishments began to rapidly outnumber houses and residential colonies that eventually led to T. Nagar's transformation into a shopping district. Currently, residential blocks are few and far between and command high real estate prices.

T. Nagar has a bus terminus on South Usman Road while the nearest railway station serving T. Nagar is the Mambalam railway station. T. Nagar's shopping district could be approached through the Doraisamy Subway from West Mambalam and Sir Theagaraya Road from the Teynampet junction on Anna Salai. T. Nagar has post and telephone offices and forms part of the Theagaraya Nagar legislative assembly constituency and the Chennai South Lok Sabha constituency.

== Location and geography ==
Map of T. Nagar

T. Nagar is located about 10 km from Chennai Airport and about 8 km from Chennai Central railway station. It lies to the west of the arterial Anna Salai (Mount Road) and is loosely bordered by Saidapet to the south and southwest, West Mambalam to the west, Kodambakkam to the northwest, Nandanam to the south, Nungambakkam to the north, and Teynampet to the east. T. Nagar is usually associated with Mambalam, a common name for the entire area of Thyagaraya Nagar, West Mambalam, C.I.T. Nagar and Pondy Bazaar. Panagal Park is located at the centre of the neighbourhood connecting five vein-roads of the neighbourhood: North Usman Road, South Usman Road, G.N. Chetty Road, Thyagaraya Road and Venkatanarayana Road.

== History ==
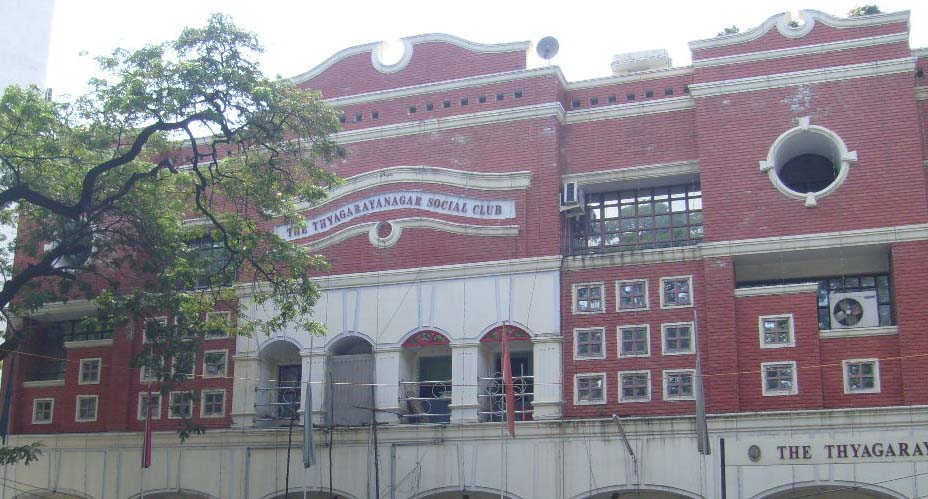
Thyagaraya Nagar social club

Until the turn of the 19th century, the villages to the west of Mount Road formed a part of Chingleput District. The Long Tank, which formed the western frontier of the city, was drained out in 1923. That very same year, the administration of the Mambalam zamindari, situated to the west of the Long Tank, was relinquished by its hereditary chief. The region had several paddy fields. During 1923–25, the township of "Thiyagaraya Nagar" named after Sir P.T. Thyagaraya Chettiar was carved out of the southern part of the erstwhile Mambalam zamindari. A park was developed at the centre of this new locality and was named in honour of the then Chief Minister, as Panagal Park. Soon afterwards, Pondy Bazaar began to make its appearance. According to historian S. Muthiah, it was initially known as 'Soundarapandia Bazaar' after Justice Party politician W. P. A. Soundarapandian Nadar. A well-planned residential area was created. Most of the streets in the new locality were named after provincial cabinet ministers, Justice Party bosses or officials in the administration.

The laying of suburban railway line from Egmore to Kancheepuram in 1911 resulted in a station at Mambalam. The first bank of the locality was opened in 1935, followed by a second one, the Indian Bank, in 1937. Retail industry started proliferating in the region with the establishment of Nalli Chinnasami Chetty's textile showroom in 1928, which was upgraded as the first Kancheepuram silk sari shop of the area in 1935. During the Second World War, the city was evacuated due to the fear of Japanese bombing. All the shops were closed and the economic activity was halted for a few days that followed.

The reason behind the naming of Pondy Bazaar still remains controversial. According to one version, Devaraj Mudaliar of Pondicherry opened 10 shops on Sir Thyagaraya Road and started calling it Pondy Bazaar. Madras historian S. Muthiah, in his book Madras Rediscovered, claims that the area was originally known as Soundarapandia Bazaar, which the government retained without change. Save for two of the streets, which were named after two workmen, Nagamani and Govindan, who died while digging trenches for the new drainage system in the locality, all the tree-lined streets were named after the stalwarts of the then ruling Justice Party.

Star-rated hotels started appearing in the locality with the opening of a three-star hotel named Residency in 1991. As of 2006, there were seven hotels with over 80 per cent occupancy rates. With the increase in retail activities in the neighbourhood, several famous theatres such as Sun, Nagesh, and Rajakumari have given way to commercial complexes.

From its early days, Thiyagaraya Nagar remained one of the most preferred residential localities in the city. The population grew exponentially during the 1930s. In its early days, film artists such as M. K. Thyagaraja Bhagavathar, T. R. Rajakumari, N. S. Krishnan, Vyjayanthimala, N. T. Rama Rao, Thangavelu, Manorama, Savitri, Sivaji Ganesan and T. S. Balaiah set up their residences here.

== Demographics ==
T.Nagar's bazaars are frequented by a number of shoppers. On a typical weekend, the number of people who move about on Pondy Bazaar, the locality's principal commercial area, might soar up to 500,000. During festival season, because of the discounts and reductions offered by dealers of silk sarees and jewellers, this number might reach 2 million. Even on a lean day, about 200,000 pedestrians traverse the roads around Panagal Park, the central part of the neighbourhood.

== Economy ==
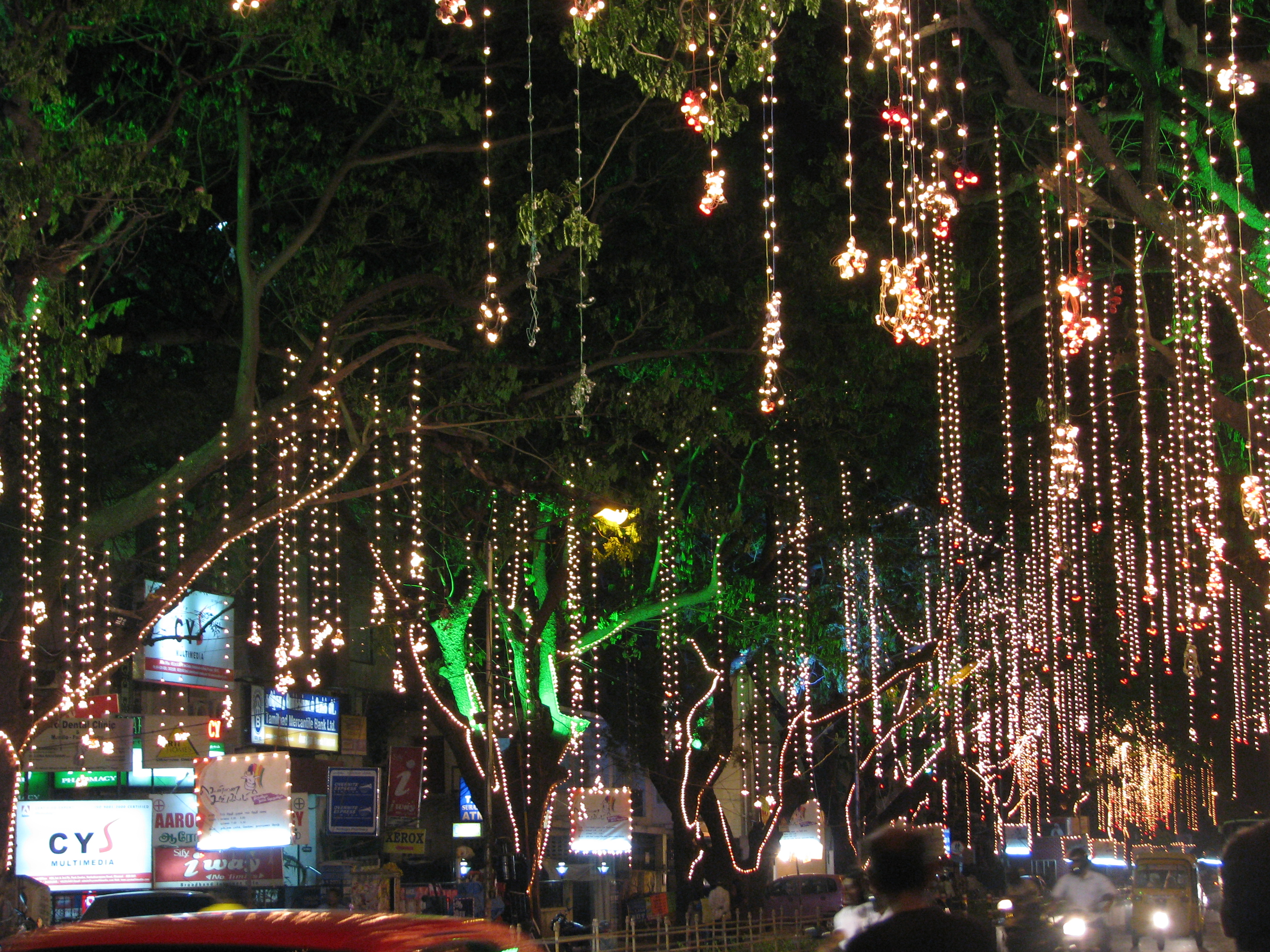

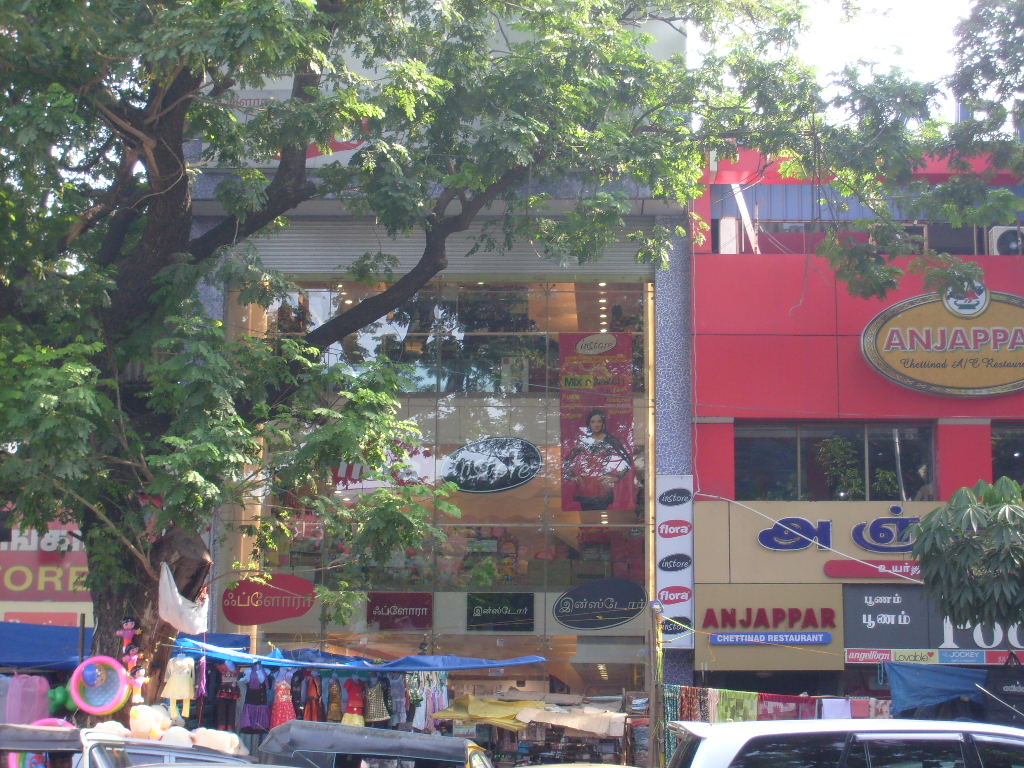
Pondy bazaar

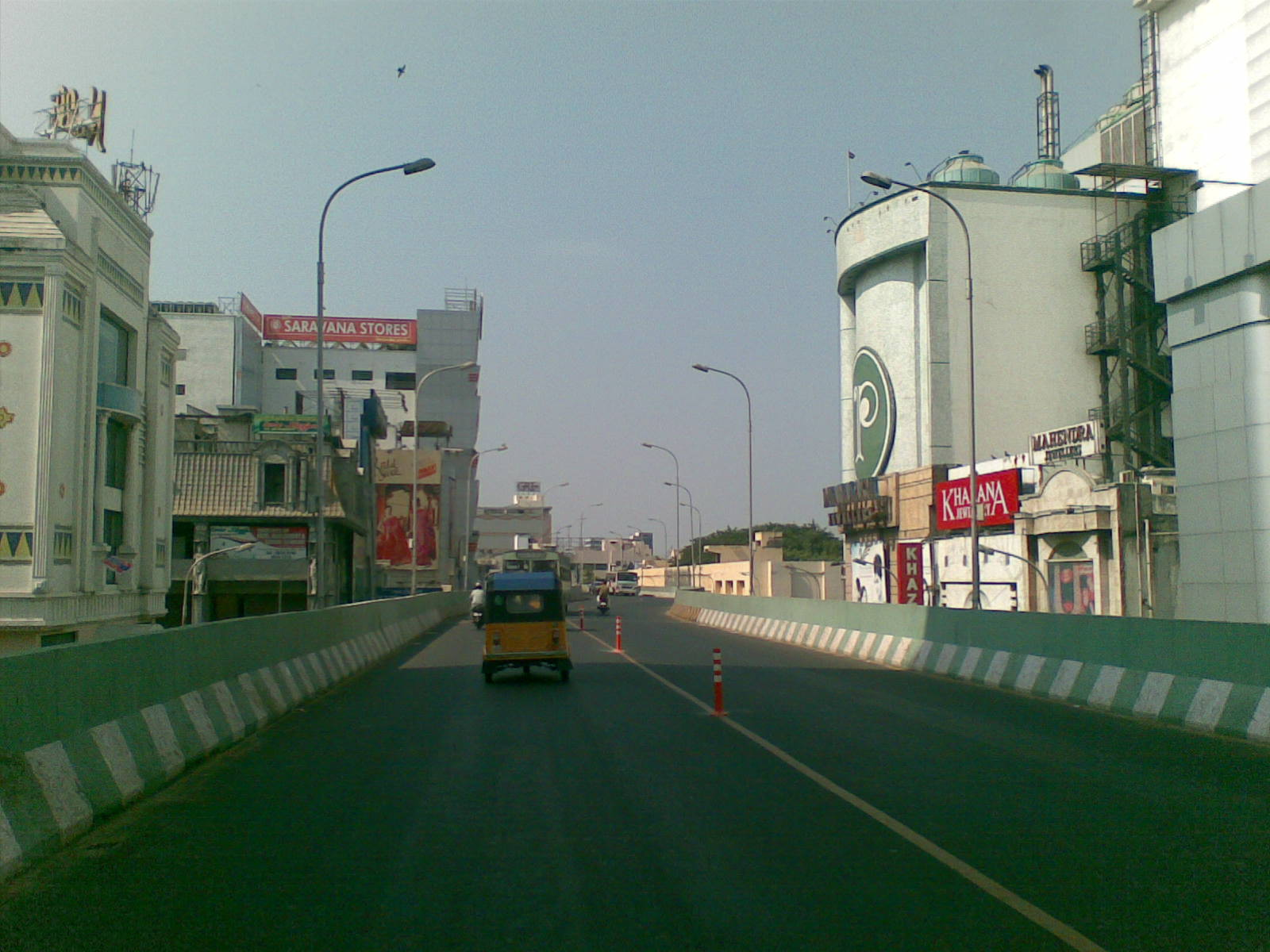
A flyover in T. Nagar

Thyagaraya Nagar is one of the busiest shopping districts of Chennai. The neighbourhood is considered to be the biggest shopping district in India by revenue. There are a number of apparel, jewellery and utensil stores based in Thiyagaraya Nagar. By some estimates, the shops in the neighbourhood together accounts for revenues of nearly ₹ 20,000 crores annually. However, official estimates put it much lower at over ₹ 10,000 crores, which is still double that of New Delhi's Connaught Place and Mumbai's Linking Road which account for about ₹ 4,000 to 6,000 crores annually. The neighbourhood accounts for about 70 to 80% of the gold sold in Chennai, the most important gold market in South India. Usman Road is the costliest commercial stretch in Chennai. The area around Panagal Park is known for its high-end textile shops, chiefly dealing with silk sarees, and jewellery stores. As of 2006, the real estate prices were ₹ 11,500 per sq.ft. Ranganathan Street is one of the most crowded roads for pedestrian traffic during day time. The road is full of big name establishments side-by-side smaller and petty shops that sell all sorts of household goods and garments.

It also houses one of the biggest private lending libraries in the city, 'Raviraj Lending Library' on Usman Road.

== Culture ==
T. Nagar offers a variety of entertainment options. It has grown to become a major hub for the Carnatic music festival-season, with a number of sabhas hosting famous performers.

It also has a number of parks, cricket grounds, and other recreational facilities. The RKM Cricket Ground adjoining GN Chetty Road hosts division IV and V city-league games.

=== Religion ===
==== Hinduism ====
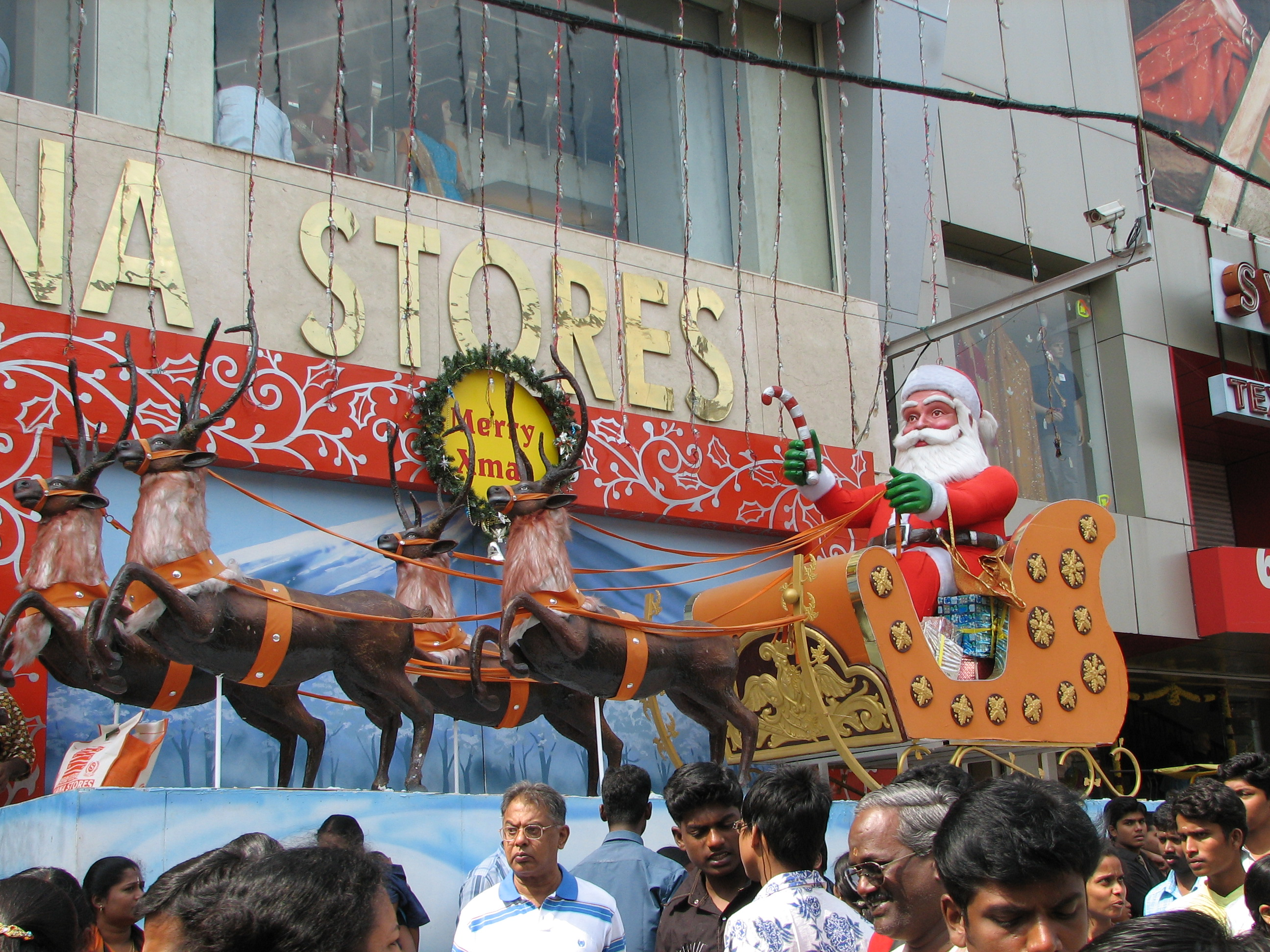
Christmas celebration in Chennai

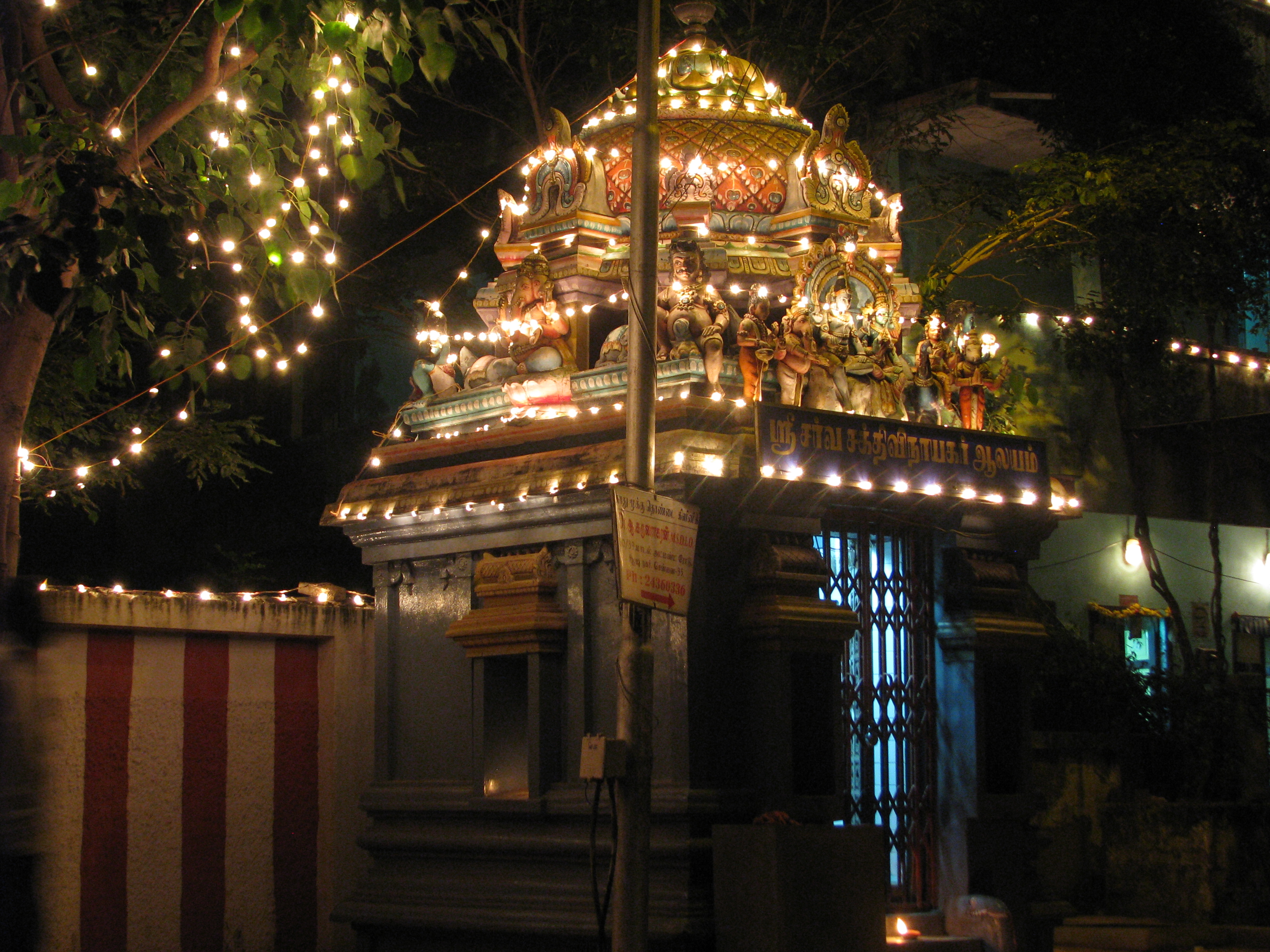
Temple in T. Nagar

Below is a list of some of the well-known Hindu temples located in T. Nagar:

- Sri Balaji Temple: This temple, located at Venkatanarayana Road, is run by the Tirumala Tirupati Devasthanam. It has a replica of Lord Venkateswara of Tirupati. Devotees planning to visit Tirupati may avail the services of the temple office to make arrangements/booking for darshan and arjita sevas (special worship rituals) at Tirumala
- T. Nagar Sringeri Saradha Peetam Temple: This temple, located at Venkatanarayana Road, is managed by the Sringeri Sharada Peetham Mutt. The temple has a large prayer and meditation hall
- Krishnan Koil (meaning "Krishna temple" in Tamil): A temple dedicated to Lord Krishna, located at South West Boag Road
- Sri Sakthi Vinayagar Temple, located at South Dhandapani Street
- Agastiyar temple, located at Raja Street
- Shiva-Vishnu temple, located near T. Nagar bus depot
- Krishna Raghavendra Mutt: Run by Udipi Pejawar Mutt, and located at Raghaviah Road
- Muppathamman temple: An Amman temple located at Maharajapuram Santhanam Salai

==== Jainism ====
Shantinath Jain temple on G. N. Chetty Road is one of the most important Swetambar Jain temples in Chennai.

==== Christianity ====
In the Roman Catholic Church, T. Nagar constitutes a parish, headed by the Holy Cross Church located in South Boag Road (now, Chevalier Shivaji Ganesan Road) under the jurisdiction of the Archdiocese of Madras-Mylapore. There is a Missionaries of Charity convent named Shishu Bhavan situated opposite to the church. The convent was inaugurated by Mother Teresa herself. Located on Thyagaraya Road in Pondy Bazaar, is the FMM Convent of the Holy Angels. This convent houses Our Lady's Nursery and Holy Angels Anglo Indian Higher Secondary School. T. Nagar also has Protestant churches like CSI Kingdom of God's church, Canaan Evangelical Church et.c

==== Islam ====
Some of the notable mosques include the Anjuman Mosque.

== Parks ==
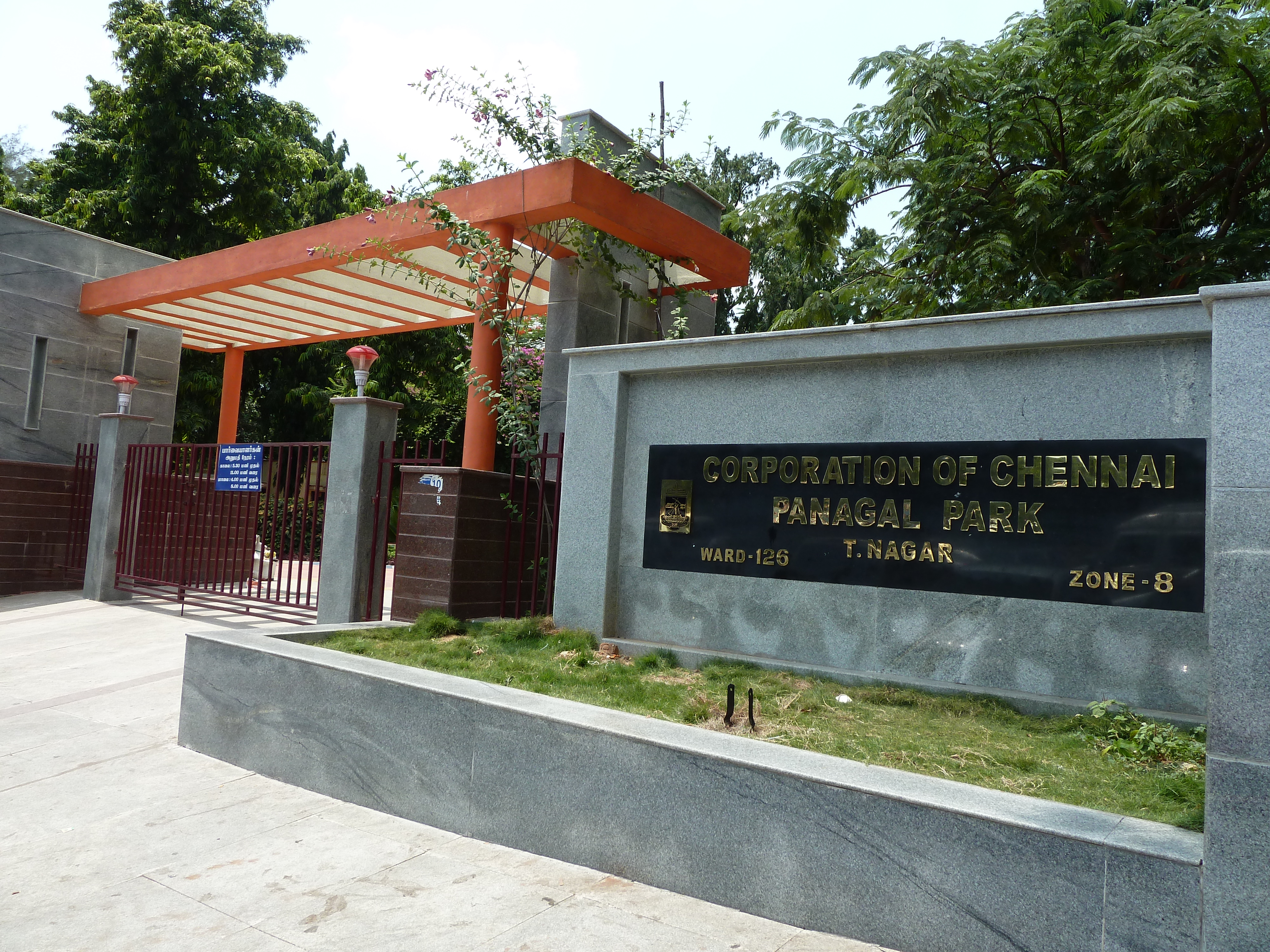
Panagal Park

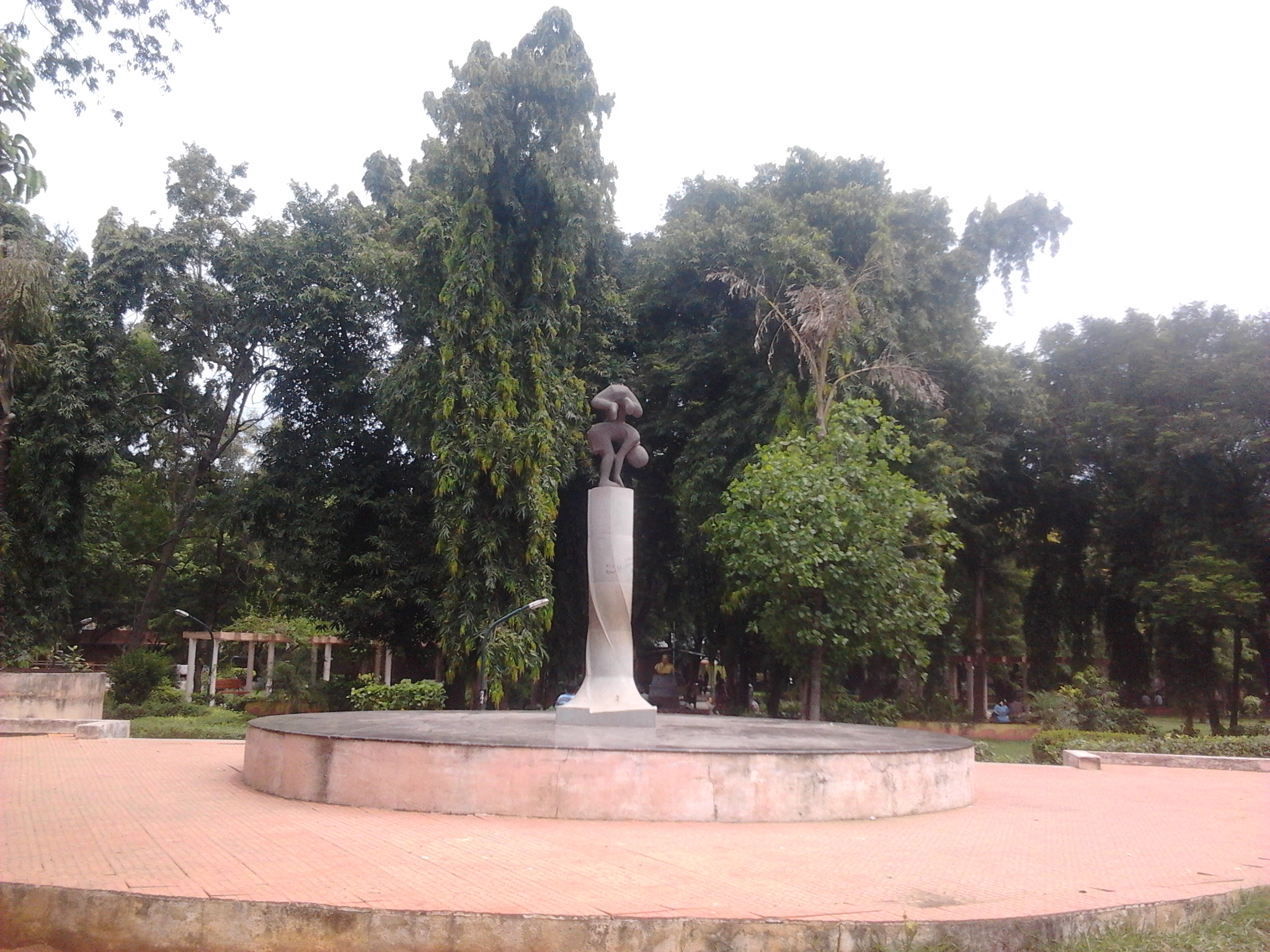
Dr.Natesan Park

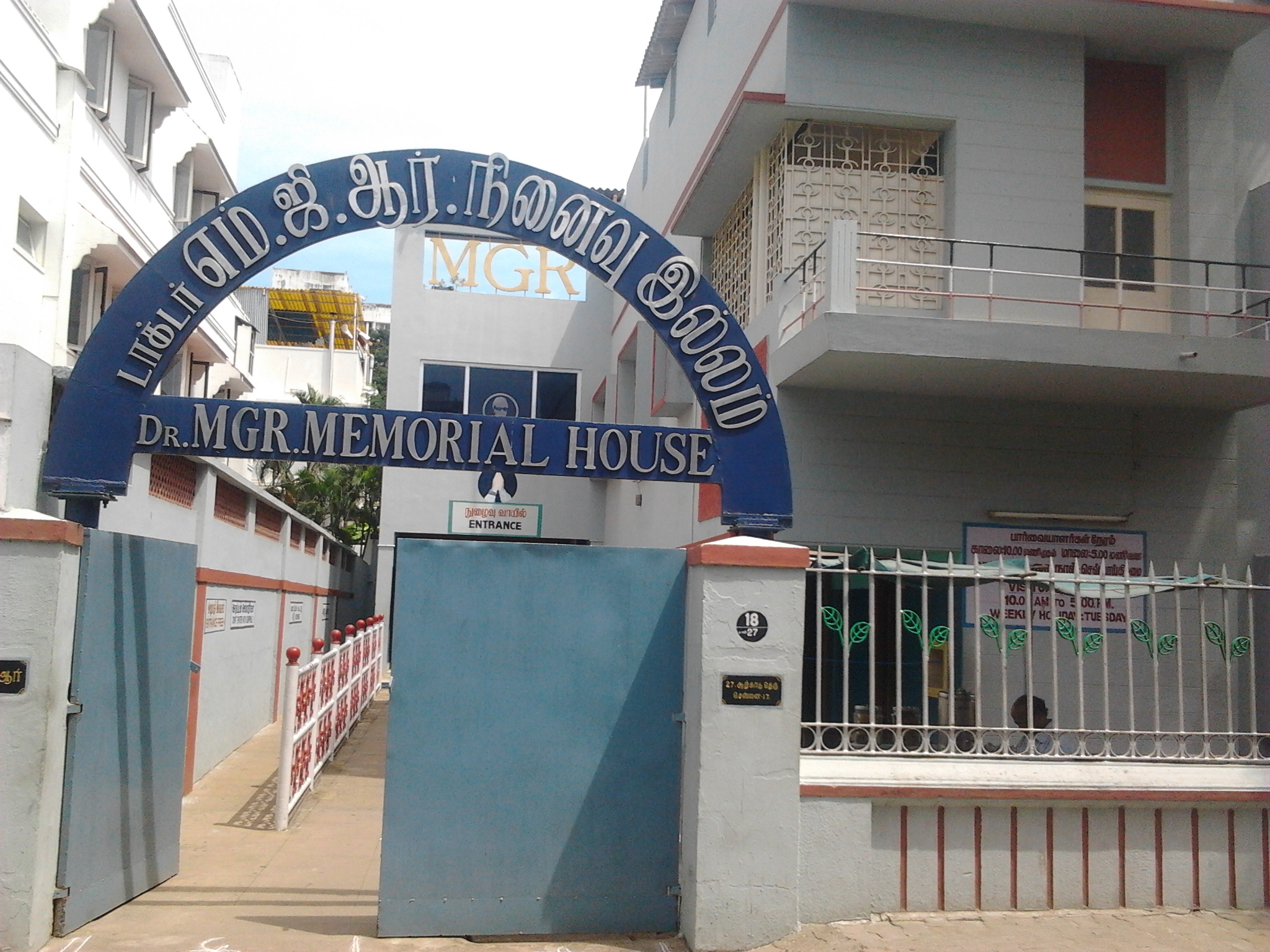
M G R Memorial house T Nagar

Being one of the centrally located neighbourhoods with both residential and commercial activities, T. Nagar has several parks and greeneries, many of which are maintained by the Corporation of Chennai. The 8-acre Panagal Park is the most prominent park in the locality with all the six arterial streets of the neighbourhood, namely, North Usman Road, South Usman Road, G. N. Chetty Road, Sir Thyagaraya Road (Pondy Bazaar), Venkatanarayana Road, and Doraiswamy Road, converging into it. The 4-acre Dr. Natesan Park, opened in 1950, is another well-known park located on Venkatanarayana Road. It is the only corporation-maintained park that has a separate tennis court for coaching children. Jeeva Park is another well-maintained park in the neighbourhood.

== Neighbourhood newspapers ==
- T. Nagar Times – Covers local news from T. Nagar and surrounding localities, and is circulated free of cost every Sunday

== Transport ==
=== Bus ===
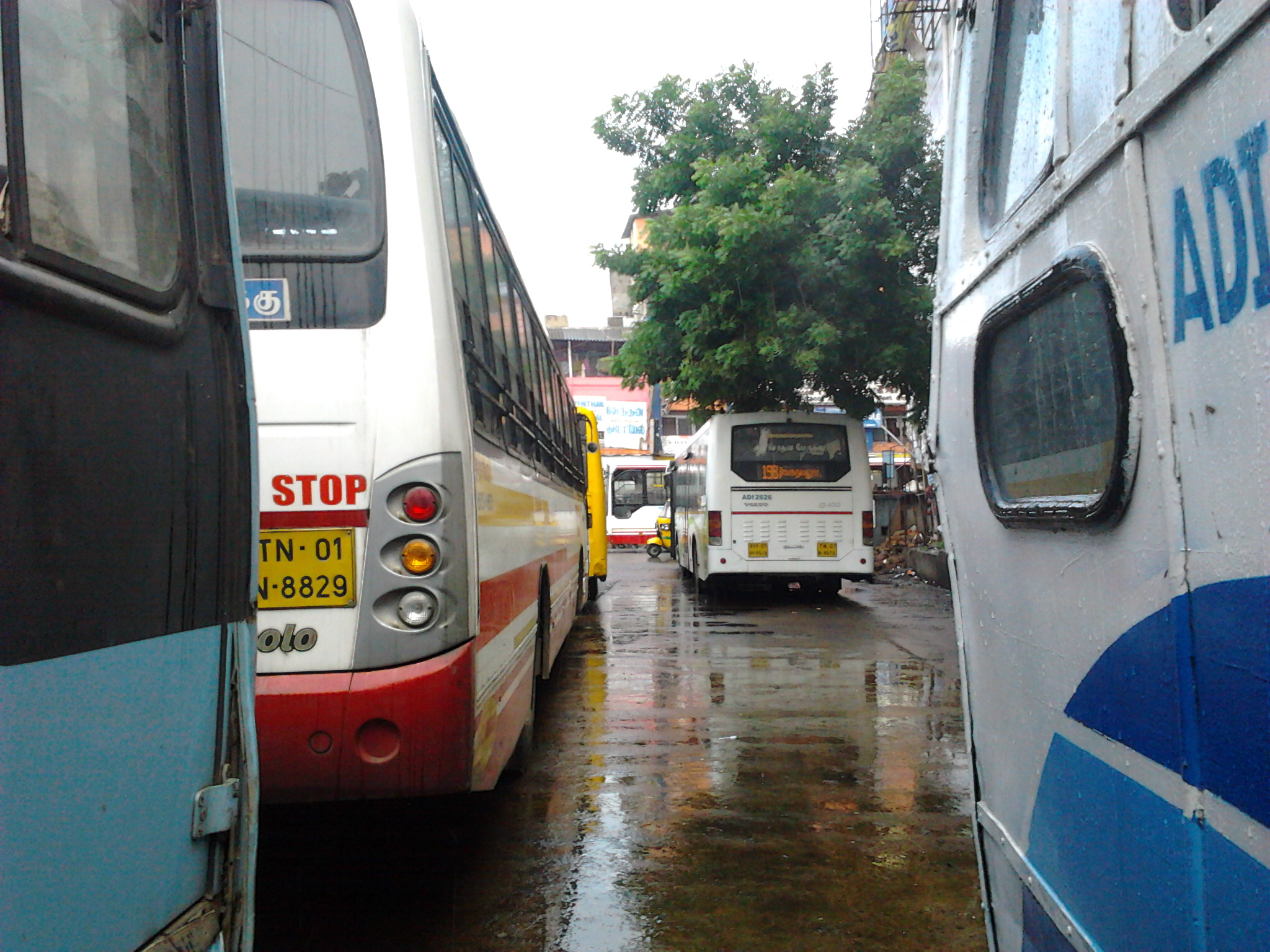
Buses at The T.Nagar Bus Terminus

T. Nagar is easily accessible from most parts of the city by bus. The T. Nagar bus terminus off Usman Road is a hub for services operating via the commercial district, including routes to Thiruverkadu, Mylapore, Kodambakkam, Avadi, Nungambakkam, Parry's Corner, Ennore, Manali, Tambaram, Poonamallee, Thiruvanmiyur, Ambattur, Pattabiram, Annanagar and Tiruvallur. There are also routes to various places in neighbouring Kanchipuram and Thiruvallur districts.

The T. Nagar bus terminus is spread around 1.95 acres and is located on South Usman road. On a daily basis 58 buses are operated from the terminus, besides 238 buses from other areas that pass through the terminus every day. The average frequency of buses at the terminus is 7 buses per minute.

Other important bus stops in T.Nagar are Panagal Park, Pondy Bazaar, Power House, and Vani Mahal.

== Politics ==
T. Nagar vote by alliance in assembly elections
Year	All India Anna Dravida Munnetra Kazhagam (AIADMK)	Dravida Munnetra Kazhagam (DMK)
2006	48.6% 74,131	37.8% 57,654
2001	46.5% 55,376	48.6% 57,875
1996	24.1% 27,463	67.2% 76,461
1991	61.2% 64,460	31.5% 33,147
1989*	21.5% 24,920	43.0% 49,772
1984	49.3% 49,038	40.3% 40,154
1980	50.6% 42,566	42.9% 36,100
1977	29.6% 22,316	30.9% 23,346

=== State assembly politics ===
T. Nagar is known for voting against the trend, voting against the winning party, on 5 separate occasions, since 1962 assembly elections. It has also become a critical swing constituency since it has become increasingly closer in recent years. It is worth noting that in the 2006 election, AIADMK was able to significantly increase their vote share, winning with a margin of 10.8%. This is mostly due to the high satisfaction of the J.Jayalalithaa government from 2001 to 2006, due to significant development that took place in that time period in the T. Nagar area.

- Note: In 1989, AIADMK was split between Jayalalithaa faction and Janaki faction, and only the Jayalalithaa faction is reported in the AIADMK column since they were the highest vote-gainers from the divided faction. The Janaki faction got 8,268, which is about 7.2% of the voters.

=== Lok Sabha politics ===
T. Nagar assembly constituency is part of Chennai South (Lok Sabha constituency).

== Pedestrian plaza ==
A ₹ 338-million pedestrian plaza was planned in 2013 by the city corporation. It involves provision of a pedestrian-friendly footpath on the 1.45 kilometre-long stretch of the Theyagaraya Road between Panagal Park and Anna Salai. It will cover 1,450 metres of Thyagaraya Road from Bashyam Road near Panagal Park to Anna Salai. The plaza will be divided into three stretches with different identities. A 12-metre wide pedestrian space will be developed in the 730-metre stretch from Panagal Park to the Thanikachalam Road junction.

Upon completion, only city buses and motorcycles will be permitted in this area in a 7-metre carriageway. All types of vehicles will be allowed on the 370-m stretch from Thanikachalam Road to the Boag Road junction, where the pedestrian plaza will be only 3.5 metres wide and carriageway will be comparatively wider measuring 15 metres. All vehicles will be permitted on the 350-metre stretch between the Boag Road junction to the Anna Salai junction.

The proposal for a cycle track has been replaced with a plan to introduce battery-operated cars. A multi-level car parking lot has also been planned. Other facilities in the plaza include seating, public toilet and a children's play area.

== Future ==
In 2013, to address the traffic concerns of the neighbourhood, Chennai Corporation tied up with real estate advisory firm Jones Lang LaSalle to exercise a proposal to redevelop the area, especially the shopping centres. T. Nagar will also be the site for the Smart City Mission in Chennai as per the Government data.

== See also ==
- Shopping in Chennai
- Economy of Chennai
- Kannammapet
- Pondy Bazaar
