= Mambalam taluk =

Township in India

Mambalam
- Taluk
- Interactive map of Mambalam

Mambalam taluk is a taluk of the city district of Chennai in the Indian state of Tamil Nadu. It was formed in December 2013 from parts of the former Egmore-Nungambakkam taluk and the Mambalam-Guindy taluk. It comprises the neighbourhoods of K. K. Nagar, Kodambakkam, Mambalam, Saligramam, Saidapet and Virugambakkam.

1. Ashok Nagar Firka: Kodambakkam (Part 2)
2. Mambalam Firka: Mambalam, Saidapet
3. Virugambakkam Firka: Virugambakkam, Nesappakkam
4. Saligramam Firka: Saligramam [Egmore-Nungambakkam taluk], Kodambakkam (Part 1) [Mambalam-Guindy taluk]
