= Kapil Kapilan =

Indian playback singer and actor (born 1992)

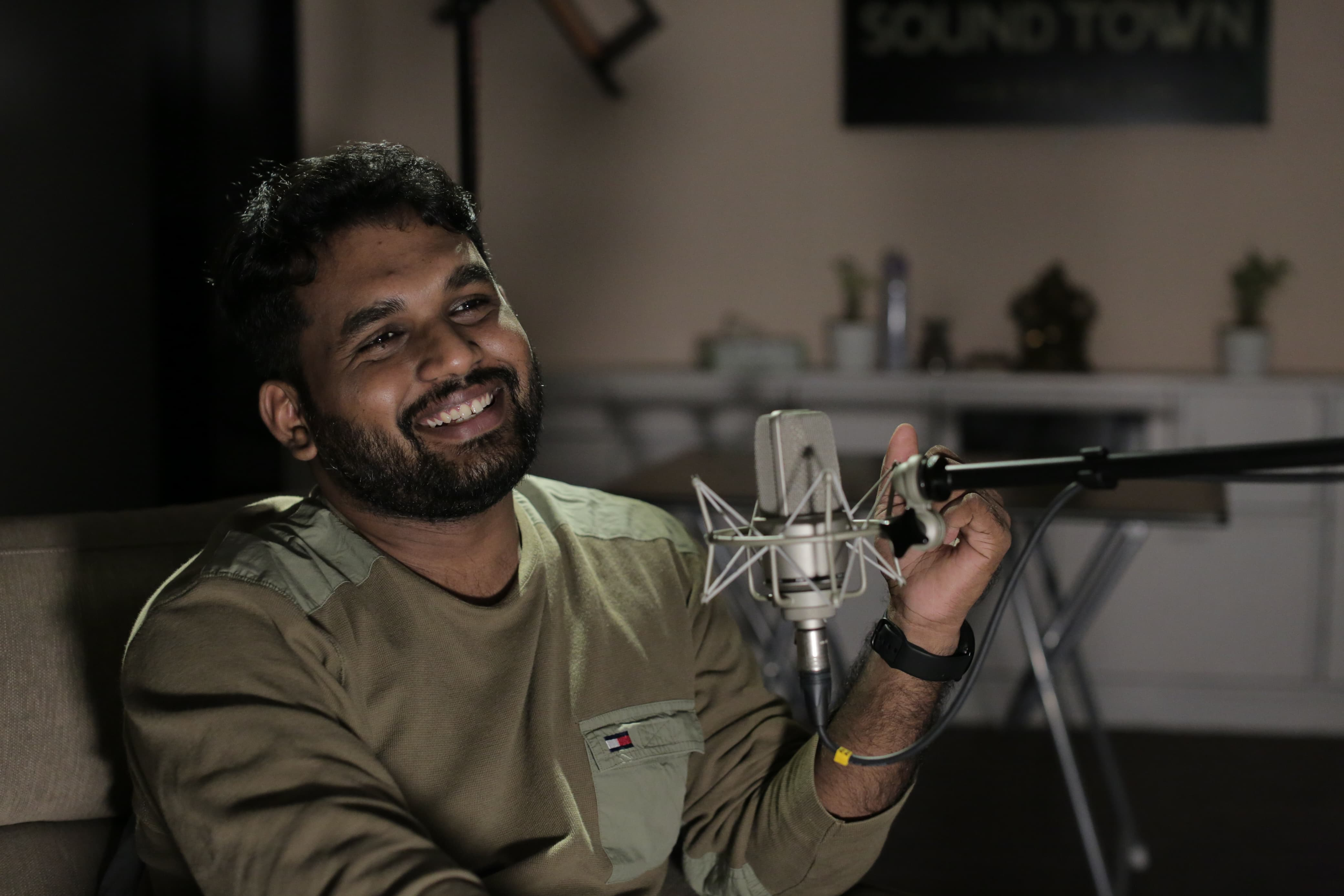

Background information
- Born: Kottarakkara, Kerala, India
- Genres: Filmi; Indian pop; Carnatic music
- Occupations: Playback Singer; Arranger; Composer; Musician
- Years active: 2017 – present
- Labels: Sony Music; Think Music; Saregama; Eros; Divo; Zee; Lahari; U1 Records; Wunderbar; Aditya; T-Series

Kapil Kapilan is an Indian playback singer, who works in Tamil, Malayalam, Telugu, and Kannada cinema. His breakthrough song came with "Adiye" from the Tamil film Bachelor.

== Early life ==
Kapilan or Kapil Nair born into a Malayali family in Kottarakkara, Kerala. He studied at Mar Ivanios College before moving to Chennai to pursue a career in music.

== Career ==
Kapilan began his career in 2017 in three languages with "Champesaave Nannu" from the Telugu film Nenu Local; "Baduke Neenentha Nataka" from the Kannada film Happy New Year; and "Usiredukkum Kootam" from the Tamil film Maragadha Naanayam.

Kapilan's career took a new turn with "Adiye", from the Tamil film Bachelor (2021), for which he won the SIIMA Award for Best Playback Singer – Tamil. He also won the Kerala State Film Award for Best Singer for the song "Kanave" from the unreleased Malayalam film Pallotty 90s Kids.

== Discography as vocalist ==
=== Tamil film songs ===
Year	Film	Song	Composer(s)	Co-singer(s)
2017	Maragadha Naanayam	"Usiredukkum Kootam"	Dhibu Ninan Thomas	
2018	Kanaa	"Kanne En Kannazhage"	Dhibu Ninan Thomas	
2019	Kolaigaran	"Idhamaai Unplugged" (Credited as "Kapil Nair")	Simon K. King	Janani S.V
2020	Utraan	"Yaarivano" (Credited as "Kapil Nair")	N. R. Raghunanthan	Sanjana Kalmanje
2021	Bachelor	"Adiye"	Dhibu Ninan Thomas	
2022	Kombu Vatcha Singamda	"Thamizh Sondhamae"	Dhibu Ninan Thomas	
2022	Kombu Vatcha Singamda	"Chinna Raasa"	Dhibu Ninan Thomas	
2022	Ratchan (D)	"Vegam"	Bharatt-Saurabh	Ramya Behara
2022	Sita Ramam (D)	"Piriyadhey"	Vishal Chandrashekhar	Chinmayi Sripada
2022	Selfie	"Yen Monam"	G. V. Prakash Kumar	
2022	Nadhi	"Theera Nadhi"	Dhibu Ninan Thomas	Srinisha Jayaseelan
2022	Trigger	"Scooby Doobaa"	Ghibran	
2022	Dejavu	"En Mel Vizhundha Mazhaiye"	Ghibran	
2022	Madhil Mel Kaadhal	"Mudhala"	Nivas K Prasanna	Darini Hariharan
2023	Run Baby Run	"Aval Oru Varam"	Sam C. S.	
2023	Thugs	"Ey Azhagiye"	Sam C. S.	Chinmayi Sripaada
2023	Ripupbury	"Kutty Poona"	Diwacara Thiyagarajan	
2023	Ripupbury	"Thangameeney"	Diwacara Thiyagarajan	
2023	Custody	"Timeless Love"	Ilaiyaraaja	
2023	Sapta Saagaradaache Ello – Side A (D)	"Nadhiye Oo Nadhiye (Title Track)"	Charan Raj	
2023	Bumper	"Kudi Kudi Thoothukudi Kudi"	Govind Vasantha	Govind Vasantha
2023	Toby (D)	"Viralinai"	Midhun Mukundan	
2023	Adiyae	"Kaadhale"	Justin Prabhakaran	
2023	Rangoli	"Sathya Life (Reprise)"	Sundaramurthy KS	
2023	Virupaksha (D)	"Nila Nila Nerupil"	B. Ajaneesh Loknath	Harshika Devanathan
2023	King of Kotha (D)	"Neere"	Shaan Rahman	
2023	Tamil Kudimagan	"Sikkikitendi"	Sam C. S.	Pooja Venkat
2023	Paayum Oli Nee Yenakku	"Hey Papa"	Sagar	
2023	Chithha	"Theera Swasame"	Dhibu Ninan Thomas	
2023	The Road	"Nagaraatha Nodiyodu"	Sam C. S.	
2023	Ezhu Kadal Thaandi - Side B (D)	"Usure"	Charan Raj	
2023	Parking	"Chella Kalliye"	Sam C. S.	
2023	Fight Club	"Yaarum Kaanadha"	Govind Vasantha	Keerthana Vaidyanadhan
2023	Vinveli Devathai	"Kadhal Fantasy"	Shameshan Mani Maran	
2024	Lover	"Velagaadha"	Sean Roldan	Aparna Harikumar
2024	Premalu (D)	"Mini Maharani"	Vishnu Vijay	Vagu Mazan
2024	Premalu (D)	"Welcome To Hyderabad"	Vishnu Vijay	Shakthisree Gopalan
2024	Bhairavakottai (D)	"Azhahey"	Shekar Chandra	
2024	Byri	"Naa Parkum Parvai"	Arun Raj	
2024	Por	"Nanpagal Neram"	Dhruv Visvanath	
2024	Guardian	"Mayakitta Mayakitta"	Sam C. S.	Srinisha Jayaseelan
2024	Idi Minnal Kadhal	"Siragaatchi Poove"	Sam C. S.	Priyanka NK
2024	The Akaali	"Por Sellum Maanida"	Anish Mohan	
2024	Romeo	"Sidu Sidu"	Barath Dhanasekar	
2024	Tharunam	"Enai Neengathe Nee"	Darbuka Siva	Pavithra Chari
2024	VIJAY LL.B	"Thevathaiye Nee (Memories Rewind)"	Balasubramanian G	
2024	Election	"Theera"	Govind Vasantha	
2024	Election	"Netrai Naalai"	Govind Vasantha	
2024	Weapon	"Naanaga Naanum Illai"	Ghibran	
2024	Rathnam	"Uyire En Uyire"	Devi Sri Prasad	Ranina Reddy
2024	Vaazhai	"Otha Satti Soru"	Santhosh Narayanan	Aditya Ravindran
2024	Cicada (D)	"Thoongum Podhu" (Edm Revisited)	Sreejith Edavana	Aparna Rajeev
2024	ARM (D)	"Kiliye"	Dhibu Ninan Thomas	Anila Rajeev
2024	ARM (D)	"Bhairavan Pattu"	Dhibu Ninan Thomas	Adithya K. N., Sreya K. A., Greeshma K. A., Vismaya K., Arya Madhusoodhanan, Mydhili N. P., Adarsh P. A.
2024	Dopamine @ 2.22	"Vaan Meghame"	Alan Shoji	
2024	Black	"En Chella Kedi"	Sam C. S.	Ranina Reddy
2024	Amaran	"Vennilavu Saaral"	G. V. Prakash Kumar	Rakshita Suresh
2024	Nirangal Moondru	"Megham Pol Aagi"	Jakes Bejoy	
2024	C4 Cinta	"Kaathaliye"	Shameshan Mani Maran	
2024	Miss You	"Orange Baby"	Ghibran	
2025	Madraskaaran	"Thai Thakka Kalyanam"	Sam C. S.	Aparna
2025	Blackmail	"Chillana Sirukki"	Sam C. S.	
2025	Messenger	"Vaaname Illa"	M. Abubakkar	
2025	Kadhale Kadhale	"Kadhale Kadhale"	Vishal Chandrashekhar	
2025	Retro	"Kannadi Poove" (Backing Vocals)	Santhosh Narayanan	
2025	Ace	"Urugudhu Urugudhu"	Justin Prabhakaran	Shreya Ghoshal
2025	Ace	"Paarvai Thani"	Sam C. S.	
2025	Manidhargal	"Mee Vizhi"	Anilesh L Mathew	
2025	Manidhargal	"Yaar Pizhai"	Anilesh L Mathew	
2025	Akkenam	"Vaazhkai Porattame"	Barath Veeraraghavan	
2025	Usurae	"Usurae Usurae"	Kiran Joze	
2025	Rekkai Mulaithen	"Dhoori Dhoori"	Theeson	
2025	Indra	"Oorum"	Ajmal Tahseen	
2025	Firefly (D)	"In The Night"	Charan Raj	
2025	Peter (D)	"Azhage Azhage"	Ritviik Muralidhar	Sangeetha Srikanth
2025	Yellow	"Kanmaniyae"	Cliffy Chris	
2025	Middle Class	"Jilloma"	Pranav Muniraj	
2026	Niram	"Noodhana"	D. Imman	Sreenisha Jayaseelan
2026	Pulse	"Saaikaathey"	Abishek Ar	
2026	The Rise of Ashoka (D)	"Yeno Yeno"	Poornachandar Tejaswi	M.D.Pallavi
2026	Jockey	"Thennattu Siruki"	Sakthi Balaji	
2026	Thalaivar Thambi Thalaimaiyil	"Rosave"	Vishnu Vijay	
2026	Couple Friendly	"Kanaa Kai Serum"	Aditya Ravindran	
2026	Couple Friendly	"Nee Naan"	Aditya Ravindran	
2026	Oh Butterfly!	"Pogaadhe"	Vaisakh Somanath	
2026	Mental Manadhil	"Uyire Uyire"	G. V. Prakash Kumar	
2026	Kaalidas 2	"Minmini Penne"	Sam C. S.	
2026	Nooru Saami	"Maaya Kanavo"	Balaji Sriram	
2026	Leader	"Nenjam"	Ghibran	Shweta Mohan
2026	Biker (D)	"Ennachcho"	Ghibran	
2026	Mr. X	"Haiyodi"	Dhibu Ninan Thomas	
2026	Irandu Vaanam	"Vellichudare"	Dhibu Ninan Thomas	
2026	Paris Cafe	"Azhagazhagai Manam"	K	Gayathree
2026	Habeebi	"Roohe Roohe"	Sam C. S.	Shweta Mohan, Rizwan Shah
2026	Double Occupancy	"Naan Varuven"	Sam C. S.	Sanjana Kalmanje
2026	Angikaaram	"Veera Veera"	Ghibran	
2026	Arulvaan	"En Kanne Vannappoove"	G. V. Prakash Kumar	
2026	Arulvaan	"En Kanne Unpola" (Male Version)	G. V. Prakash Kumar	
2026	Hi :)	"Rasagulla" (Additional Vocal)	Jen Martin	Anirudh Ravichander (Main Vocals), Sathya Narayanan, Jen Martin
2026	Bethlehem Kudumba Unit (D)	"Muttayi Vandi"	Vishnu Vijay	
2026	Bethlehem Kudumba Unit (D)	"Ille Illa"	Vishnu Vijay	
2026	Bethlehem Kudumba Unit (D)	"Oru Chinna"	Vishnu Vijay	
2026	Mandaadi	"Usure Needhan Pulla"	G. V. Prakash Kumar	Sanjana kalmanje
2026	Drones	"Thala Suthudhey"	Hari S R	Sanjana kalmanje
2026	Hello Kadhal	"Kannum Kannum"	G. V. Prakash Kumar	Sivaangi Krishnakumar
2026	Sooriyan Maraindha Maalai	"The Sundown - Theme"	AKR	V U M Ayshwarya, Yohaan Manu
2026	Sooriyan Maraindha Maalai	"Thaaragai"	AKR	

=== Tamil non-film songs ===
Year	Non-Film/Album	Song	Composer(s)	Co-singer(s)
2019	Music Video Song	"En Aruge Va"	Fazilius	Srinisha Jayaseelan
2021	The Astral (Album)	"Nilavathu Theigindra"	Kiran S Shankar	
2022	Album Song	"Adi Po Di"	Nawin Yuvaraj	
2022	1 Min Music Song	"I am Happy"	Ghibran	
2023	Sweet Kaaram Coffee (Series)	"Minmini"	Govind Vasantha	
2023	Sweet Kaaram Coffee (Series)	"Theeravanam"	Govind Vasantha	
2023	Sweet Kaaram Coffee (Series)	"Thirunaal"	Govind Vasantha	Aditya Rao, Keerthana Vaidyanathan
2023	Label (Web Series)	"Tappu Tappunu"	Sam C. S	
2023	Turkish March (Short Film)	"Reengaari"	JC Joe	
2023	Music Album Song	"Aasayil Kadhale"	Ajesh Ashok	Shashaa Tirupati
2023	Music Video Song	"Kadhal Ratchasi"	R. Sanjay	
2023	Music Album Song	"Uyiril Paaygiraay"	Akhil Issac	
2024	Coke Studio Tamil 2024 Song	"Kalyana Kacheri"	Justin Prabhakaran	Sithara Krishnakumar
2024	Music Video Song	"Medhuvaay Medhuvaay"	Rajeesh K Chandu	
2024	Music Video Song	"Vennira Iravugal"	Deepan Chakravarthy	
2024	Music Video Song	"Theera Kadhalin"	Alan Shoji	
2024	Album Video Song	"Mudiya Kadhal"	Ashlay J C	
2025	Suzhal: The Vortex- Season 2 (Television Series)	"Aalangatti Mazhai"	Sam C. S	
2025	Music Video Song	"Kaadhalaagiren"	Jubair Muhammed	Sithara Krishnakumar
2025	Album Video Song	"My Love Album Song"	Kranthi Acharya	Adithya Thadepalli, Harshitha Rachitha
2025	Oh God Beautiful (Album)	"Mute Love Story"	JC Joe	
2025	Indie Music Video Song	"Ennai Katti Kondaaye"	Nijil Dhinakar	Vaish
2025	Indie Music Album Song	"Eva"	Pranaay	
2025	Indie Music Album Song	"Uyire"	Vaishakh Jyothis	Sradha Prasannan
2025	Music Album Song	"Vizhudhile"	Naren Reddy	
2026	Music Video Song	"Ennuyire"	Vishal Chandrashekhar	Sinduri Vishal
2026	Music Album Song	"Vathana"	Jobin Sivadasan	

=== Malayalam film songs ===
Year	Film	Song	Composer(s)	Co-singer(s)
2016	Chennai Koottam	"Maattu Pongalo" (Credited as "Kapil Nair")	Sajan K Ram	Omar Hasan, Sinov Raj
2022	Bheeshma Parvam	"Aakasham Pole"	Sushin Shyam	Hamsika Iyer
2022	Night Drive	"Paathi Paathi Parayathe"	Ranjin Raj	Nithya Mammen
2022	Tha Thavalayude Tha	"Mizhiyilaaranu"	Nikhil Rajan	Manjari
2022	Sita Ramam (D)	"Thirike Vaa"	Vishal Chandrashekhar	Anne Amie
2022	Kaapa	"Yamam Veendum Vinnile"	Dawn Vincent	
2022	James (D)	"Salaam Soldier" (Credited as "Kapil Nair")	Charan Raj	
2022	Pathrosinte Padappukal	"Theeyanu"	Jakes Bejoy	
2022	Naalaam Mura	"Disha Ariyathe"	Kailas	
2023	Kadina Kadoramee Andakadaham	"Insha Allah"	Govind Vasantha	
2023	Dhoomam	"Theeye Dhaahamo"	Poornachandra Tejaswi	
2023	Anuragam	"Anuraga Sundhari"	Joel Johns	
2023	Sapta Saagaradaache Ello – Side A (D)	"Sakhiye Oo Sakhiye (Title Track)"	Charan Raj	
2023	King of Kotha (BGM Song)	"Rathinakkallu (Reprise)"	Jakes Bejoy	
2023	Christy	"Paalmanam"	Govind Vasantha	Keerthana Vaidyanathan
2023	Virupaksha (D)	"Manassine Mayakkiyirukannil"	B. Ajaneesh Loknath	Merin Gregory
2023	RDX: Robert Dony Xavier	"Neela Nilave"	Sam C. S.	
2023	Bandra	"Vaarmeghame"	Sam C. S.	Shweta Mohan
2023	Bandra	"Praanan Pol"	Sam C. S.	
2023	Maharani	"Chathayadina Paatu"	Govind Vasantha	
2023	Sapta Saagaradaache Ello – Side B (D)	"Uyire"	Charan Raj	
2023	Phoenix	"Ennile Punchiri"	Sam C. S.	K.S.Chithra
2023	Animal (D)	"Pennaale"	JAM8	
2023	Queen Elizabeth	"Nee Polum Ariyathe"	Ranjin Raj	
2024	Premalu	"Mini Maharani"	Vishnu Vijay	Vagu Mazan
2024	Premalu	"Welcome To Hyderabad"	Vishnu Vijay	Shakthisree Gopalan
2024	Jai Ganesh	"Aarambhamaay"	Sankar Sharma	
2024	Chithini	"Njanum Neeyum"	Ranjin Raj	Sanah Moidutty
2024	Little Hearts	"Edan Poove"	Kailas Menon	Sanah Moidutty
2024	Hunt	"Vidaparayathenthe"	Kailas Menon	
2024	Jananam 1947 Pranayam Thudarunnu	"Theerame Thaarage"	Govind Vasantha	
2024	ARM	"Bhairavan Pattu" (Traditional Song From Malaya Community)	Dhibu Ninan Thomas	Adithya KN, Sreya KA, Greeshma KA, VismayaK, Arya Madhusoodhanan, Mydhili NP, Adarsh PA
2024	Pavi Caretaker	"Pirakilaro"	Midhun Mukundan	
2024	Nadanna Sambhavam	"Marunna Kaalam"	Ankit Menon	Anumita Nadesan
2024	Pallotty 90's Kids	"Kanave"	Manikandan Ayyappa	
2024	1 Princess Street	"Melle Melle"	Prince George	Nithya Mammen
2024	Kadha Innuvare	"Minnum Tharangal"	Ashwin Aryan	Nithya Mammen
2024	Parakramam	"Kanmaniye"	Anoop Nirichan	
2024	Parakramam	"Saaga Saptha"	Anoop Nirichan	Athira Janakan, Christakala, Jasim Jamal
2024	Thanupp	"Mamboo Manamithaa"	Bibin Ashok	Sreenantha Sreekumar
2024	Oru Anweshanathinte Thudakkam	"Kaalam Thelinju"	M. Jayachandran	Nikhil Raj, Jaswinder Singh Sangha
2025	Dominic and the Ladies' Purse	"Margazhi - On Steroids"	Darbuka Siva	Keerthana Vaidyanathan
2025	Get-Set Baby	"Maname Aalolam"	Sam C. S.	Shakthisree Gopalan
2025	Get-Set Baby	"Athishayam"	Sam C. S.	
2025	Rekhachithram	"Chiriye"	Mujeeb Majeed	
2025	Ennu Swantham Punyalan	"Kinavin Vari"	Sam C. S.	
2025	Lovely	"Bubble Poomottukal"	Vishnu Vijay	
2025	United Kingdom Of Kerala	"Resamale"	Rajesh Murugesan	Fazzy, Rajesh Murugesan
2025	Sarkeet	"Hope Song"	Govind Vasantha	
2025	Azadi	"Hassare Hassare"	Varun Unni	
2025	Dwayam	"Cherukiliyude Vaanam"	Satheesh Ramachandran	
2025	Sumathi Valavu	"Ottanokku"	Ranjin Raj	
2025	Firefly (D)	"In The Night"	Charan Raj	
2025	Sahasam	"Nagaramo"	Bibin Ashok	Bhadra Rajin
2025	Ithiri Neram	"Madhuramoorunna"	Basil C J	
2025	Peter (D)	"Sundari Sundari"	Ritviik Muralidhar	Sangeetha Srikanth
2025	Vrusshabha	"Penne Penne"	Sam C. S.	
2026	Patriot	"Kaattu Thottappol"	Sushin Shyam	iSai
2026	Oru Durooha Saahacharyathil	"Njan Alkali"	Dawn Vincent	Neha Nair
2026	Reena	"Aaro Orunalil"	Siraj Reza	
2026	Chinna Chinna Aasai	"Subah Varanasi"	Govind Vasantha	Shikha Joshi
2026	Varavu	"Aakashappanthalaay"	Sam C. S.	
2026	Bethlehem Kudumba Unit	"Illey Illa"	Vishnu Vijay	
2026	Law and Order	"Neelakkannukal"	Joe Daniel	
2026	Sri Sri (D)	"Aaro Aaro"	G.V. Prakash Kumar	

=== Malayalam non-film songs ===
Year	Non-Film/Album	Song	Composer(s)	Co-singer(s)
2017	Christian Devotional Song	"Ennullam Sakrariyai"	David George	
2017	Mounam Ragamayi	"Peyyunnu Mazha" (Credited as "Kapil Nair")	Emil Carlton, Soorya Shyam Gopal	
2023	Album Song	"KOKO"	Arun Muraleedharan	Anila Rajeev, Krithika S, Samanvitha Prashanth, Arun Muraleedharan
2025	Music Album Song	"Pranayame"	Naren Reddy	
2026	Music Video Song	"Raavetho Eenamayi"	Anil Varghese	

=== Telugu film songs ===
Year	Film	Song	Composer(s)	Co-singer(s)
2017	Nenu Local	"Champesaave Nannu"	Devi Sri Prasad	Sameera Bharadwaj
2017	Rarandoi Veduka Chudham	"Nee Vente Nenunte" (Credited as "Kapil")	Devi Sri Prasad	Shweta Mohan
2017	Marakatha Mani (D)	"Black Sheepu" (Credited as "Kapil")	Dhibu Ninan Thomas	Arunraja Kamaraj
2017	Marakatha Mani (D)	"Katthi Sarada" (Credited as "Kapil")	Dhibu Ninan Thomas	
2018	Next Enti?	"Na Nuve Na" (Credited as "Kapil Nair")	Leon James	Shashaa Tirupati
2021	Annabelle Sethupathi (D)	"Sakhiye"	Krishna Kishor	Vidhya Gopal
2021	Rang De	"Emito Idhi"	Devi Sri Prasad	Haripriya
2022	Rowdy Boys	"Vesane O Nicchena"	Devi Sri Prasad	Sameera Bharadwaj
2022	Sita Ramam	"Oh Prema"	Vishal Chandrasekhar	Chinmayi Sripaada
2022	Sebastian P.C. 524	"My World My Heli"	Ghibran	
2022	The Ghost	"Vegam"	Bharatt-Saurabh	Ramya Behara
2022	Nuvve Naa Pranam	"Sandadi Vacheney" (Credited as "Kapil Nair")	Mani Zenna	
2022	Anaganaga Oka Adavi	"O Prema" (Credited as "Kapil Nair")	Madhu Hegde	
2023	Kalyanam Kamaneeyam	"Ho Egire"	Shravan Bharadwaj	
2023	Dhoomam	"Theerani Dhaahame"	Poornachandra Tejaswi	
2023	Vinaro Bhagyamu Vishnu Katha	"Oh Bangaram"	Chaitan Bharadwaj	
2023	Custody	"Timeless Love"	Ilaiyaraaja	
2023	Hidimbha	"Maya Maya"	Vikas Badisa	
2023	Madhave Madhusudana	"Inkedo Inkedo"	Vikas Badisa	Haripriya
2023	Nenu Student Sir	"Maaye Maaye"	Mahati Swara Sagar	
2023	Mama Mascheendra	"Gaalullona"	Chaitan Bharadwaj	Nutana Mohan
2023	Sapta Sagaralu Dhaati - Side A (D)	"Sapta Sagaralu Dhaati - Side A Title Track"	Charan Raj	
2023	Toby (D)	"Chethine"	Midhun Mukundan	
2023	Mad	"Nuvvu Navvukuntu"	Bheems Ceciroleo	
2024	Eagle	"Gallanthe"	Davzand	Lynn
2024	Rathnam (D)	"Praanam Naa Praanam"	Devi Sri Prasad	Ranina Reddy
2024	Om Bheem Bush	"The Wedding Song"	Sunny M.R.	
2024	Sriranga Neethulu	"Oohallo Oohalla"	Ajay Arasada	
2024	Yatra 2	"Prajasankalpa Yatra"	Santhosh Narayanan	
2024	Maruthi Nagar Subramanyam	"Vana Megham Kaka"	Kalyan Nayak	
2024	ARM (D)	"Chilake"	Dhibu Ninan Thomas	Anila Rajeev
2024	ARM (D)	"Bhairavan Pattu"	Dhibu Ninan Thomas	Adithya K. N., Sreya K. A., Greeshma K. A., Vismaya K., Arya Madhusoodhanan, Mydhili N. P., Adarsh P. A.
2024	Darling	"Raahi Re"	Vivek Sagar	
2024	Alanaati Ramchandrudu	"Seethamma"	Sashank Tirupathi	Pranati, Shahbaz Khan
2024	Shivam Bhaje	"Pilla Intha Late"	Vikas Badisa	
2024	KA	"World of Vasudev"	Sam C. S.	
2024	Prema Geema Thassaadhiyya	"Nuvu Premava"	Kiran Nairuth	
2024	Dopamine @ 2.22 (D)	"Aakaasame"	Alan Shoji	
2024	Bhale Unnade	"Set Avuthundhaa"	Shekar Chandra	
2024	Roti Kapda Romance	"Arere Arere"	RR Dhruvan	
2024	Weapon (D)	"Neninka Nenu Kaanu"	Ghibran	
2024	Lopaliki Ra Chepta	"Lady Kalla Pilla"	Davzand	
2025	Artiste	"Chusthu Chusthu"	Suresh Bobbili	
2025	Retro (D)	"Kannullona"	Santhosh Narayanan	
2025	14 Days Girlfriend Intlo	"Manase"	Mark K Robin	Ramya Behara
2025	23 Iravai Moodu	"Cherasala"	Mark K Robin	Chinmayi Sripada
2025	Mr. X (D)	"Haiyayyo"	Dhibu Ninan Thomas	
2025	MissTerious	"Aanandame"	M L Raja	Sameera Bharadwaj
2025	Firefly (D)	"In The Night"	Charan Raj	
2025	Arjun Chakravarthy	"Megham Varshinchada"	Vignesh Baskaran	Meera Prakash, Sujith Sreedhar
2025	K-Ramp	"Kalale Kalale"	Chaitan Bharadwaj	
2025	The Girlfriend	"Laayi Le"	Hesham Abdul Wahab	
2025	12A Railway Colony	"Gunde Gudilo"	Bheems Ceciroleo	
2025	Peter (D)	"Sundari Sundari"	Ritviik Muralidhar	Sangeetha Srikanth
2025	Love OTP	"Doora Doora"	Anand Rajavikram	
2026	Bhartha Mahasayulaku Wignyapthi	"Addham Mundhu"	Bheems Ceciroleo	Shreya Ghoshal
2026	Couple Friendly	"Naa Praanam"	Aditya Ravindran	
2026	Couple Friendly	"Naato Raa Ila"	Aditya Ravindran	
2026	Nawab Cafe	"Sakhire"	Prashanth R Vihari	
2026	Biker	"Emaindo"	Ghibran	Aditi Bhavaraju
2026	Ramani Kalyanam	"Kallolam"	Sooraj S Kurup	Avani Malhar
2026	Anakapalli	"Yelage Pilla"	Davzand	
2026	Srinivasa Mangapuram	"Raave Cheliya"	G V Prakash Kumar	
2026	Irumudi	"Manemma"	G V Prakash Kumar	
2026	Sri Sri	"Bomma Bomma"	G V Prakash Kumar	
2026	The Maze	"Nanne Nanne"	Shravan Bharadwaj	
2026	Bethlehem Kudumba Unit (D)	"Mithai Bandi"	Vishnu Vijay	
2026	Bethlehem Kudumba Unit (D)	"No No"	Vishnu Vijay	
2026	Bethlehem Kudumba Unit (D)	"Oka Manchu"	Vishnu Vijay	
2026	Srirastu	"Emani Varninchanu"	Shekar Chandra	
2026	Reality	"Rutthuu"	Bheems Ceciroleo	
2026	Haindava	"Evaraina"	Sam C. S.	Shweta Mohan

=== Telugu non-film songs ===
Year	Non-Film/Album	Song	Composer(s)	Co-singer(s)
2023	Music Video Song	"Manasaa"	CNU Beats	Sireesha Bhagavatula
2024	Music Video Song	"Nachadhe"	Bharatt-Saurabh	
2025	Music Video Song	"My Love Album Song"	Kranthi Acharya	Adithya Thadepalli, Harshitha Rachitha
2025	Music Video Album Song	"Jagamule"	Naren Reddy	

=== Kannada film songs ===
Year	Film	Song	Composer(s)	Co-singer(s)
2017	Happy New Year	"Baduke Neenentha Nataka" (Credited as "Kapil Nair")	Raghu Dixit	
2018	Kattu Kathe	"Give Me A Sutta" (Credited as "Kapil Nair")	Vikram Subramanya	Vikram Subramanya, Natana Prasanth
2018	Kattu Kathe	"Nee Kanasa" (Credited as "Kapil Nair")	Vikram Subramanya	
2019	Bhootha Kaala	"Parishuddha Hridayadali" (Credited as "Kapil Nair")	Pramod Surya	Anuradha Bhat
2023	Sapta Saagaradaache Ello – Side A	"Sapta Saagaradaache Ello Title Track"	Charan Raj	
2023	Toby	"Beralanu"	Midhun Mukundan	
2023	Bad Manners	"Oga Oga"	Narayan Sharma	
2023	Ondolle Love Story	"Neenu Yaaro"	Akash SN Jadhav	
2024	ARM (D)	"Giniye"	Dhibu Ninan Thomas	Anila Rajeev
2024	ARM (D)	"Bhairavan Pattu"	Dhibu Ninan Thomas	Adithya K. N., Sreya K. A., Greeshma K. A., Vismaya K., Arya Madhusoodhanan, Mydhili N. P., Adarsh P. A.
2024	Laughing Buddha	"Entha Chendane"	Vishnu Vijay	
2024	Ibbani Tabbida Ileyali	"Oh Anahita"	Gagan Baderiya	
2024	Kerebete	"Bhuvana Hudukadidhe"	Gagan Baderiya	
2024	Rudra Garuda Purana	"Kann Munde Bandu"	Priyanka Kumar	Shweta Mohan
2025	Rakshasa	"Oh Nanna Jeevave"	Varun Unni	
2025	Firefly	"In The Night"	Charan Raj	
2025	Peter	"Sundari Sundari"	Ritviik Muralidhar	Sunidhi Ganesh
2025	Bengaluru Inn	"Baanaache Ello"	Asif A Kader, Aravind Murali	Anuradha Bhat
2025	Devil	"Onde Onde Sala"	B. Ajaneesh Loknath	Chinmayi Sripada
2025	Vrusshabha (D)	"Chinna Chinna"	Sam C. S.	
2025	Maarnami	"Ye Maaraya"	Charan Raj	Mangli
2025	Maarnami	"Kaarmoda Karagi"	Charan Raj	Sinduri Vishal
2025	Love OTP	"Gotheyagallila"	Anand Rajavikram	
2026	Theertharoopa Thandeyavarige	"Nanade Jagadalli"	Joe Costa	
2026	Theertharoopa Thandeyavarige	"Kaledu Hodavaru"	Joe Costa	
2026	Mango Pachcha	"Araginiye"	Charan Raj	Saanvi Sudeep
2026	Graamaayana	"Benki"	Poornachandra Tejaswi SV	Airaa Udupi
2026	Sukhibhavaa	"Kattethu Nodadha"	Subam	
2026	Peter	"Sundari Sundari"	Rithvik Muralidhar	Sunidhi Ganesh
2026	Srirastu (D)	"Eepari Soundaryavaa"	Shekar Chandra	
2026	Marriage Party	"Andagaathiye"	Ritvik Muralidhar	Suman Narayan

=== Kannada non-film songs ===
Year	Film/Album	Song	Composer(s)	Co-singer(s)
2025	Music Album Song	"Gudugidhu"	Naren Reddy	
2026	Bhoomi 2025	"Kushi"	Salim–Sulaiman	

=== Hindi film songs ===
Year	Film	Song	Composer(s)	Co-singer(s)
2022	James (D)	"Salaam Soldier" (Credited as "Kapil Nair")	Charan Raj	
2023	Sapta Saagaradaache Ello – Side A (D)	"Saatho Saagar (Title Track)"	Charan Raj	
2024	Eagle (D)	"Jeena Hai Jeena Hai"	Davzand	Pavani Vasa
2024	Ajayante Randam Moshanam (D)	"Tu Hai"	Dhibu Ninan Thomas	Anila Rajeev
2024	Ajayante Randam Moshanam (D)	"Bhairavan Pattu"	Dhibu Ninan Thomas	Adithya K. N., Sreya K. A., Greeshma K. A., Vismaya K., Arya Madhusoodhanan, Mydhili N. P., Adarsh P. A.
2025	Retro (D)	"Gull Ainaa" (Backing Vocals)	Santhosh Narayanan	Hriday Gattani
2025	Firefly (D)	"In The Night"	Charan Raj	

=== Hindi non-film songs ===
Year	Film	Song	Composer(s)	Co-singer(s)
2025	Indie Music Album Song	"O Saaware"	Pranaay	

=== Marathi film songs ===
Year	Film	Song	Composer(s)	Co-singer(s)
2025	Khavvis	"Berangi"	Yogi - Nikhil	Ananya Bhat

== Awards and achievements ==
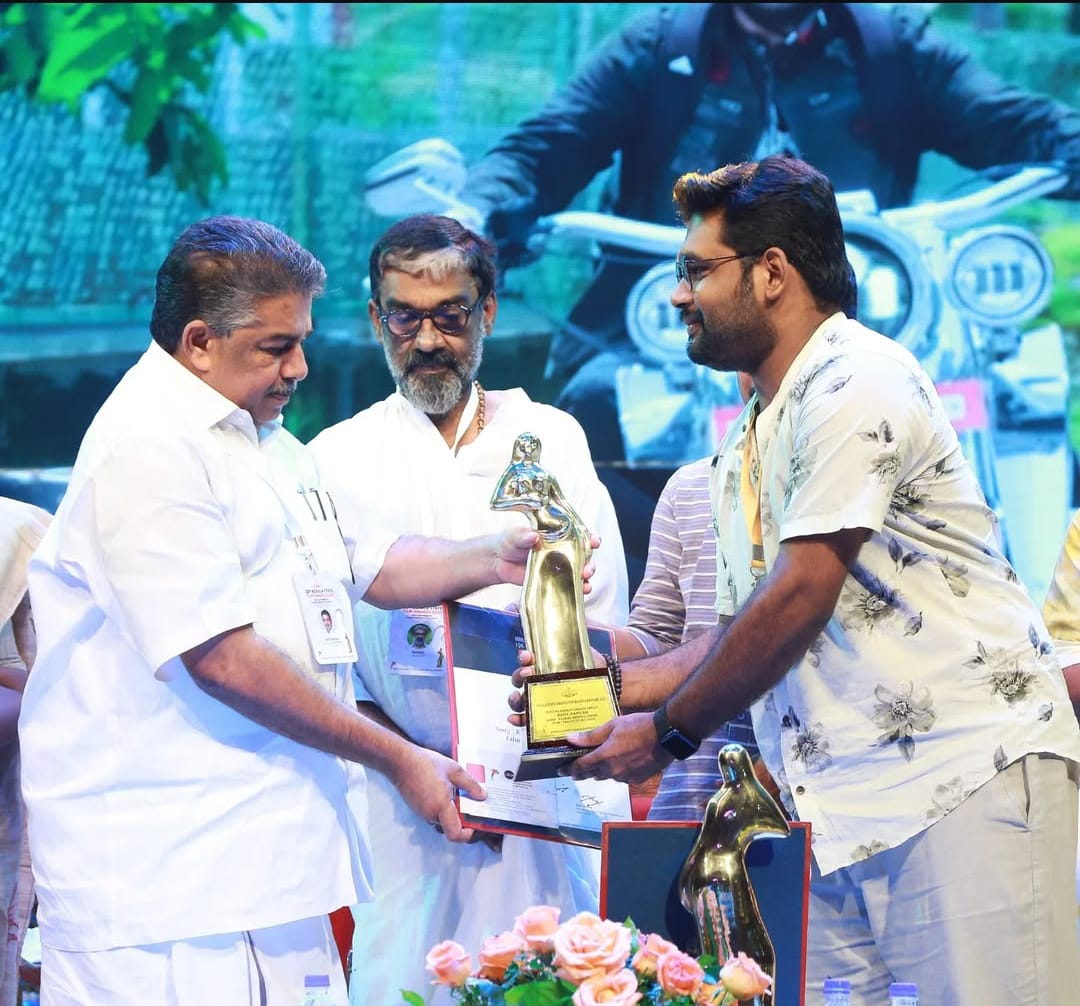
53rd Kerala State Film Awards for Best Playback Singer ( Male)

Awards & Achievements
Year	Award	Category	Film/Other
2022	Mirchi Music Awards South	upcoming male vocalist of the year	Bachelor (Adiye)
2022	South Indian International Movie Awards (SIIMA)	Best Playback Singer (Male)	Bachelor (Adiye)
2022	Ananda Vikatan Cinema Awards	Best male playback singer	Bachelor (Adiye)
2022	53rd Kerala State Film Awards	Best Playback Singer ( Male)	Pallotty 90's Kids (Kanave)
2022	J C Daniel Foundation Film Award	Best Playback Singer	Pallotty 90's Kids (Kanave)
2023	69th Filmfare Awards South	Best Playback Singer (Malayalam)	RDX: Robert Dony Xavier (Neela Nilave)
2023	69th Filmfare Awards South	Best Playback Singer (Kannada)	Sapta Saagaradaache Ello – Side A ( Title Track)
2023	Mazhavil music awards	Best male singer	RDX: Robert Dony Xavier (Neela Nilave)
2023	Prajavani Cini Samman	Best Playback Singer	Sapta Saagaradaache Ello – Side A ( Title Track)
2023	Kalabhavan Mani memorial Award	Best Playback Singer	RDX: Robert Dony Xavier (Neela Nilave)
2023	International Indian Film Academy Awards (IIFA)	Best Playback Singer	Sapta Saagaradaache Ello – Side A ( Title Track)
