= Madharaasi =

2025 Indian film by A. R. Murugadoss

- Theatrical release poster
- Directed by: A. R. Murugadoss
- Written by: A. R. Murugadoss
- Produced by: N. Srilakshmi Prasad
- Starring: Sivakarthikeyan; Rukmini Vasanth; Vidyut Jammwal; Biju Menon; Vikranth; Shabeer Kallarakkal
- Cinematography: Sudeep Elamon
- Edited by: A. Sreekar Prasad
- Music by: Anirudh Ravichander
- Production company: Sri Lakshmi Movies
- Release date: 5 September 2025
- Running time: 168 minutes
- Country: India
- Language: Tamil
- Budget: ₹170 crore
- Box office: est. ₹55 crore

Madharaasi (transl. Man from Madras) (Note: Madrasi is also a slur used by people from North India to refer to people from South India, especially those from Tamil Nadu.) is a 2025 Indian Tamil-language psychological action thriller film written and directed by A. R. Murugadoss. Produced by Sri Lakshmi Movies, the film stars Sivakarthikeyan, Rukmini Vasanth, Vidyut Jammwal, Biju Menon, Vikranth and Shabeer Kallarakkal in the lead roles. In the film, a fregoli delusion patient becomes involved in an operation to stop a North Indian syndicate from distributing guns across Tamil Nadu.

The film was officially announced in September 2023. Principal photography took place from February 2024 to May 2025 across locations including Chennai and Pondicherry. The film has music composed by Anirudh Ravichander, cinematography handled by Sudeep Elamon and editing by A. Sreekar Prasad.

Madharaasi was theatrically released on 5 September 2025 and received mixed to positive reviews from critics. who praised its cinematography, visuals, Anirudh's soundtrack, performances (especially Sivakarthikeyan and Vidyut Jammwal), and action sequences but criticized the plot, runtime, and logical errors. Despite the strong opening, the film underperformed at the box-office.

== Plot ==
An illegal arms syndicate attempts to spread gun culture in Tamil Nadu by transporting five trucks loaded with firearms, led by syndicate members Virat and Chirag. A National Investigation Agency (NIA) officer Premnath "Prem," who strongly opposes gun proliferation, and his son, Sandeep, lead a team to intercept the consignment. Although they confront the syndicate, Virat and Chirag escape with the shipment, leaving Prem severely injured. While hospitalized, Prem meets Raghuram "Raghu," a Renault showroom employee struggling with suicidal thoughts after his breakup with his girlfriend, Malathi. Prem later learns from a mole inside Virat's crew that the weapons are being stored at a gas cylinder factory. When official approval for a high-risk mission is denied, and impressed by Raghu's resourcefulness, Prem persuades him to infiltrate the factory in what is essentially a suicide mission. Prem eventually sends an officer to find out more details about Raghu who eventually finds out that he is a mental asylum patient.

Two years earlier, Raghu had met Malathi, a dental student and part-time singer, after stopping a street robbery. Their bond deepened when she treated him during dental training sessions, eventually leading to their courtship. However, Malathi discovered that Raghu suffers from Fregoli delusion, a psychological disorder stemming from childhood trauma after losing his family in Pondicherry. Believing strangers were his lost relatives, Raghu repeatedly endangered himself trying to rescue others. Malathi realized her presence restricted his compulsion to save lives, which she feared could endanger others. She chose to leave him to protect those around him.

In the present, the syndicate begins distributing firearms freely to promote gun culture, resulting in a school student acquiring a gun. Raghu attempts to intervene but is shot in the process, proving his willingness to sacrifice himself. Shocked but resolute, Prem orders Raghu to infiltrate the factory despite Sandeep's objections. He enters the factory disguised as a worker but is discovered by an intoxicated Virat, who secretly orders his men to move weapons without Chirag's knowledge. Raghu engages Virat and his men in combat but initially spares Virat, defying Prem's command to kill him. When Chirag later calls, Raghu intercepts the call and hears Chirag threaten Malathi's life, forcing him to fatally shoot Virat. His screams trigger Raghu's delusion, and he eventually delivers Virat to the NIA, where Prem confines him in a hidden “dark house” for treatment.

Chirag, believing Virat to be dead, storms the NIA office with the help of an insider mole, Sudarshan, killing Sandeep during his attempt to protect Malathi. Raghu later confronts Chirag via video call, claiming that Virat is alive, allowing Chirag to spare Malathi's life. Suspecting Sudarshan, Raghu uncovers him as the mole and uses him to locate Chirag's hideout. With Prem's aid, Raghu brutally incapacitates Chirag. Following the losses to his team and grieving Sandeep, Prem's remaining team members kill Chirag the same way he killed Sandeep (via the officers surrounding him, and later brutally executing him); afterwards, he is removed from the case. A new NIA officer, who is secretly a syndicate member, orchestrates an attack on Raghu in custody, triggering a violent transformation in him. Meanwhile, Virat escapes from the dark house and prepares to distribute the remaining arms across multiple cities after meeting with the syndicate members.

Raghu storms the harbor, engaging Virat in an intense hand-to-hand battle. Virat later shoots Malathi (who later was revealed to be alive), and Raghu ultimately kills him and destroys the containers by dumping them into the sea, neutralizing the weapons, while Prem and his team kill Virat's men. After the conclusion of the mission, Prem and his men ponder about the success of it, with Prem attributing it to Raghu and Malathi's love. It is shown that Raghu and Malathi have successfully reunited.

== Cast ==
- Sivakarthikeyan as Raghuram
- Rukmini Vasanth as Malathi (Voice dubbed by Mahalakshmi Sudarsanan)
- Vidyut Jammwal as Virat
- Biju Menon as Premnath "Prem"
- Vikranth as Sandeep
- Shabeer Kallarakkal as Chirag
- Sanjay as Raghu's brother
- Aadukalam Naren as Inspector Manoharan
- J. Livingston as Raghu's delusional father
- Thalaivasal Vijay as Dr. Kannan
- Vinodhini Vaidyanathan as Raghu's aunt
- Santhana Bharathi as Raghu's grandfather
- Rishi Rithvik as Harsha, NIA team member
- Sachana Namidass in Deleted Scenes
- Chandrasekar Koneru as NIA team member
- Gurupharan Karthikeyan as Virat's henchman
- Siddhartha Shankar as PC 2, an undercover NIA team member (voice dubbed by Umair Lateef)
- Tejas Krishnan as PC 1, an undercover NIA team member
- Monisha Vijay as Malathy's younger sister
- Nanditha Sreekumar as Raghu's mother
- Rajesh Balachandiran as Sudarshan, Virat's undercover henchman
- Vimala Raman as Sherin, member of the syndicate
- A. R. Murugadoss as a person in the crowd (cameo appearance)
- Cell Murugan as a theatregoer (uncredited appearance in the song "Thangapoovey")

== Production ==
=== Development ===
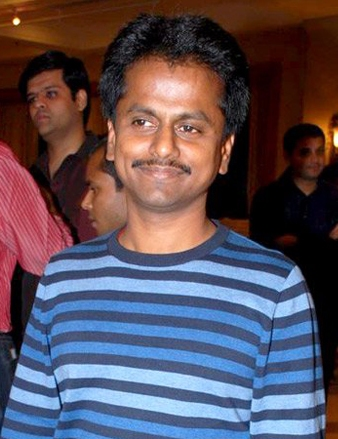
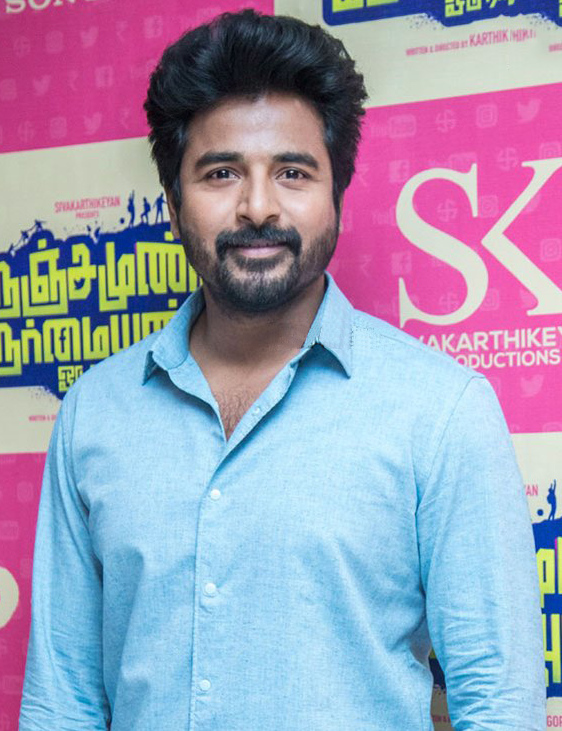
Madharaasi is the first collaboration of A. R. Murugadoss and Sivakarthikeyan.

In December 2020, director A. R. Murugadoss reportedly met Sivakarthikeyan and discussed about a potential collaboration. After no updates about the film being progressed, it was then reported that production would begin sometime in 2023, as Sivakarthikeyan had completed most of his prior commitments. In March 2023, at the audio launch of Murugadoss' production venture August 16 1947 (2023), Sivakarthikeyan hinted about his collaboration with the director, while Murugadoss then officially confirmed the project later that month. The project is funded by N. Srilakshmi Prasad under Sri Lakshmi Movies in their maiden production venture, as the company had previously distributed Telugu and Tamil films. The company made a public announcement on 25 September 2023, coinciding with Murugadoss' birthday and tentatively titled SKxARM and SK23, and the official title, Madharasi, was announced on 17 February 2025, coinciding with Sivakarthikeyan's birthday. An additional "a" was added later, making the final title Madharaasi.

=== Pre-production ===
The project marks Sivakarthikeyan and Murugadoss's second collaboration, after the former's Tamil debut with Marina (2012), as Murugadoss previously worked as producer and co-writer in the Sivakarthikeyan-starrer Maan Karate (2014). But before the actor entered the industry, he hosted the audio launch for Murugadoss' directorial film 7 Aum Arivu (2011) and the director's production venture Engaeyum Eppothum at a similar event in the same year. In August 2025, Murugadoss revealed that he had written the script seven or eight years before, and it was pitched to Shah Rukh Khan, but did not materialise.

Murugadoss initially planned to direct a Hindi film which would involve extensive visual effects, and a graphics studio was reported to fund the project. However, as the Hindi film industry was facing a financial crisis owing to a number of films underperforming theatrically after the COVID-19 pandemic, he rescinded those plans and instead revisited the script which was meant for Sivakarthikeyan. A muhurat puja was held at a studio in Chennai on 6 February 2024 with the presence of the film's cast and crew.

In early-February 2023, Sudeep Elamon was announced as the cinematographer. As he predominantly works in the Malayalam cinema, it marks his first film in Tamil cinema. Anirudh Ravichander would score the music, in his third film with Murugadoss after Kaththi (2014) and Darbar. Editor A. Sreekar Prasad, stunt choreographers Dhilip Subbarayan and Kevin Kumar and art director Arun Venjaramoodu, were brought on board for the technical crew. Sivakarthikeyan went through a workshop with acting coach Rajesh Balachandiran to change his body-language. Reportedly made with a budget of ₹200 crore, Sivakarthikeyan and Murugadoss's remuneration are reported to be ₹40 crore and ₹50 crore respectively.

=== Casting ===
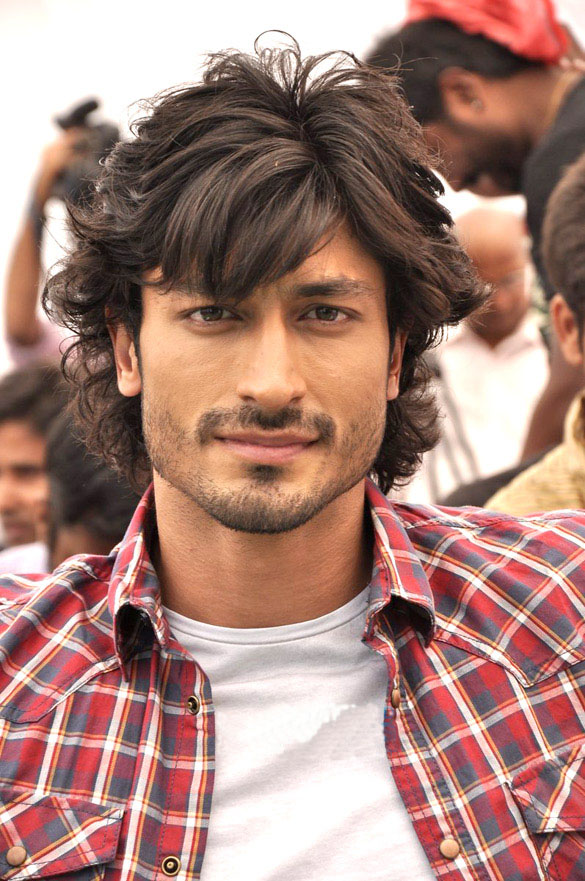
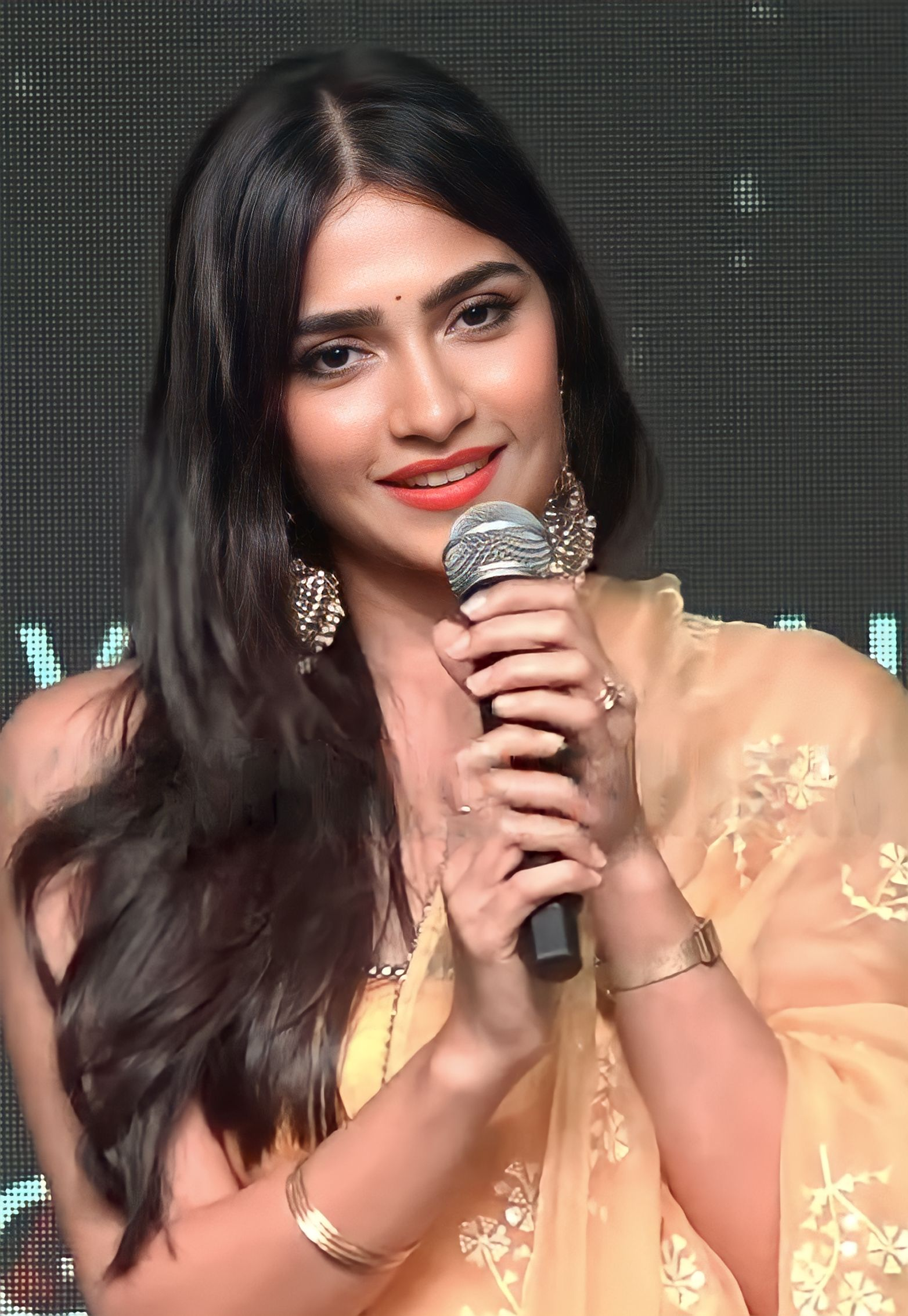
Biju Menon and Vidyut Jammwal made their return to Tamil cinema after more than a decade, while Rukmini Vasanth would make her Tamil sophomore.

Sivakarthikeyan would sport a thick beard, unlike any of the characters he had previously done before. His character was reported to be a person who suffers from a psychological disorder, where he would overcome his trauma to confront the enemies and will be seen in multiple looks. Although Mrunal Thakur was initially reported to play the female lead, Rukmini Vasanth was later cast, in her second Tamil film after Ace. Speaking of her casting, Murugadoss admitted that he wanted someone who looked like a practical young woman, adding that "I saw her films, and found her personality to be closer to the kind of character that I’d written."

Initially, Mohanlal and Vidyut Jammwal were reported to play important roles in the film. While Jammwal's inclusion was confirmed, playing the antagonist, Mohanlal reportedly could not accept the offer due to scheduling conflicts. The film marks Jammwal's return to Tamil cinema after 11 years since his last release, Anjaan (2014); Murugadoss stated that Jammwal agreed to be part of the film before even listening to the script or the story. Biju Menon was announced part of the cast, reportedly replacing Mohanlal, also marking his return to Tamil cinema after 15 years since Porkkalam (2010). Vikranth and Shabeer Kallarakkal were also confirmed to be part of the cast. Sanjay, who acted as a child artist in Aranmanai 4 (2024), revealed in an interview that he would be playing the younger brother of Sivakarthikeyan's character.

=== Filming ===
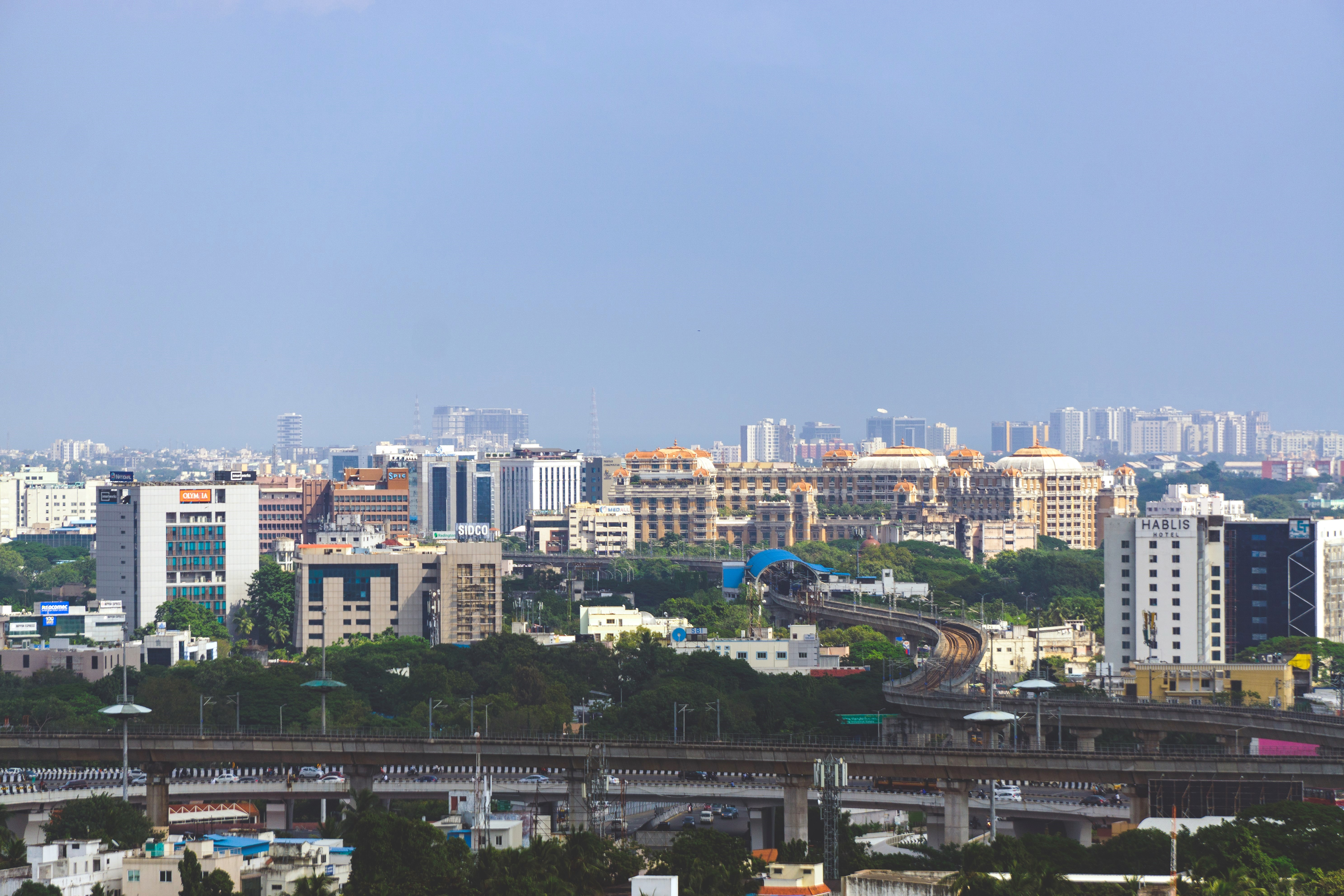
The film was predominantly shot in Chennai.

Principal photography began with the first schedule on 14 February 2024 in Chennai. The second schedule commenced on 13 March in Pondicherry and continued for a few days before returning to Chennai. On 24 March, Murugadoss posted on Instagram that a sequence was filmed at the Thirumayilai railway station, also penning an emotional note as he also shot a portion for Ramanaa (2002), which starred late actor Vijayakanth, there. In early April, a portion featuring Sivakarthikeyan and Jammwal was reportedly shot, and a song sequence was also filmed at the streets of Pondy Bazaar in T. Nagar. The same month, a romantic sequence featuring Sivakarthikeyan and Rukmini was shot at the Saveetha Institute of Medical And Technical Sciences. Following this, shooting was briefly paused as Sivakarthikeyan had to participate in the final schedule of Amaran (2024).

Filming resumed with the concurrent schedule in Chennai on 6 June, where the team shot few high-octane action sequences. This schedule was completed within two weeks, and filming was put on hold to allow Murugadoss' commitments to the Hindi film Sikandar (2025). On 12 July, the team resumed filming with a minor schedule in Thoothukudi and would return to Chennai for the final phase of filming. In September, it was reported that only 20 days of filming was left. A small schedule was held at Tambaram in Chennai in early November. In this schedule, a high-risk stunt sequence was filmed where Sivakarthikeyan jumped from the top of a bridge without a rope or a body double. The schedule was then completed on 23 November. In January 2025, Sivakarthikeyan said filming was 90% complete. In late January, it was reported that Murugadoss had decided to resume filming and complete the remaining portions within the following March, before continuing on Sikandar. However, the final schedule began on 18 May in Sri Lanka. Filming wrapped at the end of the same month.

=== Post-production ===
Visual effects for the film are provided by Knack Studios, Lorven Studios, Prasad Group, Phantom FX and Beast Bells. Sreekar Prasad serves as the film's editor, and started the editing works by June 2024. Magalakshmi Sudharsanan dubbed for Rukmini, in her debut as a dubbing artist.

== Music ==
The soundtrack is composed by Anirudh Ravichander, in his third collaboration with Murugadoss after Kaththi (2014) and Darbar (2020); eighth with Sivakarthikeyan. (Note: Anirudh Ravichander and Sivakarthikeyan previously collaborated for Ethir Neechal (2013), Maan Karate (2014), Kaaki Sattai (2015), Remo (2016), Velaikkaran (2017), Doctor (2021) and Don (2022). They also collaborated for 3 (2012), which also marked Anirudh's debut as a music director; however Sivakarthikeyan acted in that film in a supporting role.) The audio rights were acquired by Junglee Music. The first single, "Salambala", was released on 31 July 2025. The second video single "Vazhiyiraen" was released on 23 August 2025. Although an audio launch event was held on 24 August 2025 at Chennai, the album was released on streaming platforms three days later, on the occasion of Ganesh Chaturthi.

== Release ==
=== Theatrical ===
Madharaasi was theatrically released on 5 September 2025. Apart from the original Tamil language, it was also released in dubbed versions in Telugu, Kannada, Malayalam and Hindi languages, with the Hindi version titled Dil Madharaasi.

=== Distribution ===
Prathyangira Cinemas acquired the distribution rights of the film for the United States. Phars Films bought the overseas distribution rights of the film, and 4 Seasons Creations distributed the film in Europe. Karmic Films distributed the film including its Hindi dubbed version in North India.Fivestar AV distributed the film in Malaysia.

=== Home media ===
The film began streaming on Amazon Prime Video from 1 October 2025 in Tamil and dubbed versions of Telugu, Hindi, Malayalam and Kannada languages and the satellite rights were purchased by Zee Tamil and Zee Thirai.

== Reception ==
=== Critical response ===
Madharaasi received mixed to positive reviews from critics, who praised the lead cast's performances (particularly Sivakarthikeyan, Vasanth and Jammwal) and action sequences, while the predictable plot and inconsistent screenplay received criticism.

Several critics described the film as Murugadoss' strongest work in recent years, drawing comparisons to the quality and style of his early days. Sajin Shrijith of The Week gave 3.5/5 stars and wrote "Sivakarthikeyan plays a trauma-riddled yet empowered hero in a film with some neatly done high-octane action sequences, self-aware narrative, and surprising merits that overshadow its minor flaws." Avinash Ramachandran of Cinema Express gave 3/5 stars and wrote "Vidyut Jammwal steals the show in Madharaasi, with Sivakarthikeyan establishing his evolution as an actor, but it is a Murugadoss show that steers home this mad ride" The Times of India gave 3/5 stars and wrote, "AR Murugadoss returns to form with a muscular action entertainer that finds its anchor in Sivakarthikeyan's robust performance as a man with Fregoli delusion."

Vidyut Jammwal's presence received widespread praise, with several critics describing the film as a strong comeback for the actor to Tamil cinema after 11-year absence since Anjaan. Anusha Sundar of OTTPlay gave 2.5/5 stars and wrote "A passable Murugadoss thriller that works in parts, yet misses emotional depth." Arjun Menon of The Indian Express gave 2.5/5 stars and wrote "The film shows glimpses of AR Murugadoss operating at his full powers. But ultimately, Sivakarthikeyan-starrer is frustrating as an exercise in action storytelling because it is too tired to break its own conventionality." Janani K of India Today gave 2.5/5 stars and wrote "‘Madharaasi’ has a story that has the potential to have been another ‘Thuppakki’ or ‘Kaththi’, both of which lived up to the commercial entertainer tag. However, the story settles for mediocrity. Keeping aside the performances and action blocks, ‘Madharaasi’ is a film that doesn't rely on intelligence. "

Arun Antony of Deccan Herald gave 2.5/5 stars and wrote "‘Madharaasi’ is only for fans of Sivakarthikeyan and his comedic timing and charm." Gowtham S of Pinkvilla gave 2.5/5 stars and wrote "Madharaasi is a thrilling action entertainer that delivers brief cinematic highs but lacks emotional and narrative depth. While the story had the potential of becoming the next ‘Kaththi,’ or ‘Thuppakki,’ the film fell short in execution." Bhuvanesh Chandar of The Hindu wrote "After an excellent first half, the screenplay maintains its pace in the second half, at least until before the below-par final act. Towards the end, though, Murugadoss trades reasoning for some hero-appeasement that appears odd. [...] Madharaasi, thankfully, comes as a saving grace, showing how impactful action can be when propelled by well-written pathos." Deccan Chronicle gave it 2/5 stars and wrote "Madhrasi Fails to Pack a Punch Due to Dreary Narration. Sivakarthikeyan, known for comedy-centric hits like Don and Doctor, gives his all to fit into a muscular action avatar, but the uneven writing limits his impact. Anirudh Ravichander, expected to elevate the film with catchy tunes and a pulsating background score, surprisingly falls short."

=== Box office ===
In India, Madharaasi was released alongside Bad Girl, Ghaati, Gandhi Kannadi, Baaghi 4 and The Bengal Files, and was initially projected to gross ₹18 crore (US$1.9 million) worldwide in its opening day. The film went on to earn an estimated ₹13 crore (US$1.4 million) domestically on its first day, the highest among the new releases, and ₹21 crore (US$2.2 million) worldwide, marking the second-highest opening day for Sivakarthikeyan after Amaran. On its second day, it grossed ₹11.75 crore (US$1.3 million) in India, making its domestic gross ₹25.40 crore (US$2.7 million).

In Malaysia, the film opened in second place, finishing ahead of Jackie Chan's The Shadow's Edge, before dropping to sixth place in its following week.

It concluded its theatrical run with worldwide gross estimated to be ₹45-50 crore.

== Lawsuit ==
Post-release, the producer sued Murugadoss seeking compensation, saying the director had promised to keep the budget around ₹110 crore (US$12 million) but overshot to ₹170 crore (US$18 million).

== See also ==
- Trigger, has a similar premise about dealing with gun culture and distribution – 2025 South Korean TV series
