= Peter (2026 film) =

- Directed by: Sukesh Shetty
- Screenplay by: Sukesh Shetty
- Story by: Sukesh Shetty
- Produced by: Ravi Hiremat; Rakesh Heggade
- Starring: Rajesh Dhruva; Janvi Rayala; Raviksha Shetty
- Cinematography: Guruprasad Narnad
- Edited by: Naveen Shetty
- Music by: Rithvik Muralidhar
- Production company: Vruddhi Studios
- Distributed by: KVN Productions
- Release date: 10 April 2026
- Running time: 141 minutes
- Country: India
- Language: Kannada

Peter is a 2026 Indian crime drama film written and directed by Sukesh Shetty. It stars Rajesh Dhruva, Janvi Rayala and Raviksha Shetty in the lead roles. The film is produced by Ravi Hiremat and Rakesh Heggade under the Vruddhi Studios banner. The plot revolves around a troubled chende drummer who returns to his hometown, where a past conflict tied to a temple festival unravels a web of love, betrayal and hidden violence.

Details of the film were first made public in September 2024, when close a month's filming was completed. It was revealed that the plot revolved around cultural themes of Karnataka and Kerala. Set in the Kodagu district of Karnataka, filming locations included Madikeri and Bhagamandala. Upon theatrical release on 10 April 2026, the film opened to mixed-to-positive reviews from critics. Peter Movie now Streaming on Prime Video in Kannada , Tamil , Malayalam.

== Plot ==
Peter, a skilled chende drummer, returns to his hometown in Kodagu after spending a year in Kerala training local percussionists. He is welcomed home by his aging parents, who live modestly in a house surrounded by coffee plantations. While his father struggles with alcoholism, his mother suffers from a severe mental condition stemming from a tragedy in the family's past. As Peter settles back into village life, the narrative alternates between the present and events that occurred before his departure.

A year earlier, Peter had led a respected chande troupe that performed annually as a service to the local temple festival. An altercation involving fellow drummer Sharath Chandra "Batani" caused a rift within the group, resulting in rival factions led by Peter and Batani. During the festival, Peter's troupe delivered a disciplined performance, while Sharath's team faltered due to lack of preparation. Sharath was struck on the head by a stone thrown by an unknown assailant and was hospitalized. Suspicion immediately fell on Peter, particularly from Sharath's politically connected brother, Subhash Chandra, despite Peter's repeated denials. At the same time, Peter's college-going girlfriend Meera revealed that she was pregnant with his child. Following Batani's death in hospital and Subhash's lookout for Peter, Peter's close friend and troupe member Shambhu urged him to flee the town, warning that Subhash's men were seeking revenge. Believing his life to be in danger, Peter left for Kerala. Shortly thereafter, he learned through Shambhu that Meera had died by suicide, unable to bear the social stigma surrounding her pregnancy.

Back in the present, Peter finds his mother's condition worsening after a woman named Radha and her young son move into the neighbouring house. Mistaking Radha for Jessy, Peter's deceased sister-in-law, his mother repeatedly demands that Peter drive her away. Through flashbacks, it is revealed that Peter's elder brother David and his wife Jessy died in a fire years earlier. Frustrated with village life, Jessy had threatened to burn herself and David unless they were allowed to move away. When an accident caused the kerosene-soaked couple to catch fire, both died, and Peter's mother was left permanently traumatized. Determined to restore his mother's peace, Peter repeatedly harasses Radha in hopes of forcing her to leave, but she remains defiant. Meanwhile, Peter discovers that Shambhu neglected the responsibility of caring for his mother during his absence and has transformed the once-devotional troupe into a commercial venture for personal gain, causing many members to leave.

Seeking answers, Peter confronts Radha and learns the truth. Radha reveals that she is Meera's elder sister and had moved next door intending to avenge Meera's death, believing Peter had abandoned her after learning of the pregnancy. Their confrontation is interrupted by Shambhu, who confesses that he orchestrated the events that destroyed Peter's life. Consumed by jealousy over Peter's popularity and leadership of the troupe, Shambhu manipulated Meera into despair, encouraged Peter to flee under the guise of concern, and allowed Radha to believe Peter was responsible for Meera's death. As a violent struggle ensues, intercut with the rhythmic beats of the festival's chande performance, Peter and Radha turn against Shambhu. Radha ultimately kills him, avenging her sister's death. With the truth finally exposed, Radha leaves the village with her son, having found closure. Peter's mother, believing that Jessy has finally departed, peacefully bids her farewell.

== Cast ==
- Rajesh Dhruva as Peter
- Janvi Rayala as Radha
- Raviksha Shetty as Meera
- Ram Nadagoud as Shambu
- Varun Patel as Subhash Chandra
- Prathima Nayak as Mary, Peter's mother
- Raghu Pandeshwar as Shankar, Radha's colleague
- Radhakrishna Kumble as Peter's father
- Deena Poojari as Jessy
- Siddu
- G. B. Bharath as David
- Manu Kasargod
- Rakshith Doddera as Sharath Chandra "Batani"

== Production ==
Details of the film was first made public on 15 September 2024. It was revealed that the film would be released in three languages: Kannada, Tamil and Malayalam. Ravi Hiremath and Rakesh Hegde under the banner Vriddhi Studios produced the film. A first-look poster of the film was released.

Director Shetty revealed the names of the lead actors in the film. Rajesh Dhruva, who has transitioned from television serials to films, was the male lead, alongside Rajesh. Janvi Rayala and debutant Raviksha Shetty had been hired to play the female leads. In preparation for her role, Rayala stated, "Growing up, I had observed women in rural areas. Additionally, Sukesh would enact scenes and guide me, and I would interpret them in my own way. He kept telling me to control my expressions and let my eyes do the talking. That made the performance very subtle."

Revealing the filming details, Shetty stated, "We have completed 29 days of shooting extensively in Madikeri and are now waiting for a season change to resume. The first half was shot entirely in natural rain, as required by the plot, with several sets constructed in the rural village of Bhagamandala. At this point, we've scheduled a break to allow the three main actors to focus on reducing their weight for the remaining scenes." In an interview with the Times of India, he stated, "By filming in Madikeri and Bhagamandala, we've captured an intense suspense drama set amid lush greenery. The visuals make you feel the mist, rain and thunder of Coorg right from your seat."

== Music ==
Peter

Soundtrack album by Rithvik Muralidhar
- Length: 15:15
- Label: Think Music

The film's soundtrack was composed by Rithvik Muralidhar, and singers included Ajay Gogavale, Pranavam Sasi, making his debut in Kannada, and Kapil Kapilan. The music rights were brought by Think Music, a then major music label in Tamil, Malayalam, and Telugu cinema, entering the Kannada music for the first time. The soundtrack included four tracks. Sasi sang "Ding Dong Bell" written by Trilok Trivikrama.

Track listing
No.	Title	Lyrics	Singer(s)	Length
1.	"Sundari Sundari"	Trilok Trivikrama	Kapil Kapilan, Sunidhi Ganesh	4:42
2.	"Thaaye Thaaye"	Sukeerth Shetty	Rithvik Muralidhar	3:33
3.	"Josh Jawani"	Trilok Trivikrama	Ajay Gogavale	3:42
4.	"Ding Dong Bell"	Trilok Trivikrama	Pranavam Sasi	3:18
Total length:				15:15

== Marketing and release ==
Sukesh Shetty, who had previous directed Dooradarshana (2023), stated that Peter would be a crime drama film. The poster had an abandoned vintage Yamaha RX motorcycle, and a wall sketch illustrating musicians in mid-performance in the background. It also had two handwritten notes on the wall "Jessie vapas bandidaale" in the Kannada and "Royal chande hudugaru" in the Tamil and Malayalam versions. It was reported that the film would revolve around Singari Mela, a traditional art form, and that it would be set against the backdrop of Kerala's Chende Mela, a traditional drum ensemble known for its dynamic and rhythmic performances. Director Shetty revealed that the plot would also include Yakshagana and Buta Kola, the art forms of Karnataka.

When the film's trailer was released a year later, on 30 October 2025, further details were revealed. Media reported that the film explored the darker edges of human emotion and morality. The report added that the film's lead actor Rajesh Dhruva appeared as Peter, a man defined by his past, tormented by his present, and feared by those around him. His internal struggle between love and vengeance drove the emotional rhythm of the story. The names of the supporting actors were also mentioned: Ram Nadagoud, Varun Patel, Prathima Nayak, Raghu Pandeshwar, Radhakrishna Kumble, Deena Poojari, Siddu, Bharath, Manu Kasargod and Rakshit Doddera.

The film was released theatrically on 10 April 2026. It was distributed by KVN Productions. The digital streaming rights were acquired by Prime Video and began streaming on the platform from 5 June 2026 in Kannada , Tamil and Malayalam

== Reception ==
Upon theatrical release, the film was received well by audiences. Due to positive word of mouth publicity, increased occupancy was observed in centers in Bengaluru, Mandya, Mysore, Davangere and Shivamogga in the second week.

Critics gave the film mixed-to-positive reviews. Jagadish Angadi of Deccan Herald rated 2/5 stars and felt that the ritual of Chande, that the film is based on, is not fully explored in the film. He added that the "narrative, which soon turns predictable, is briefly elevated through Ritvik Muralidhar's music." He concluded praising the acting performances of Prathima Nayak, who "stands out for her performance as an elderly woman grappling with a psychological disorder," while adding that the rest of them are convincing. Bangalore Mirror's Y. Maheswara Reddy reviewed positively and rated the film three out of five.

A. Sharadhaa of the New Indian Express also gave the film a similar rating, and wrote: "Director Sukesh Shetty allows moments to stretch. He does not rush to explain or resolve. The film shifts between timelines and tones, sometimes smoothly, sometimes with visible breaks, but ultimately arrives at a place of justified revenge. There are portions where the flow feels uneven, yet that unevenness reflects Peter's state of mind. Ritvik Muralidhar's music is another highlight, not just in the songs but in how it threads through the film." While commending the acting performances on the film, she concluded that the "screenplay could have been sharper." Mixed-to-positive reviews were given also by Kannada media such as Kannada Prabha and Chitralahari.
