= Rukmini Vasanth =

Indian film actress

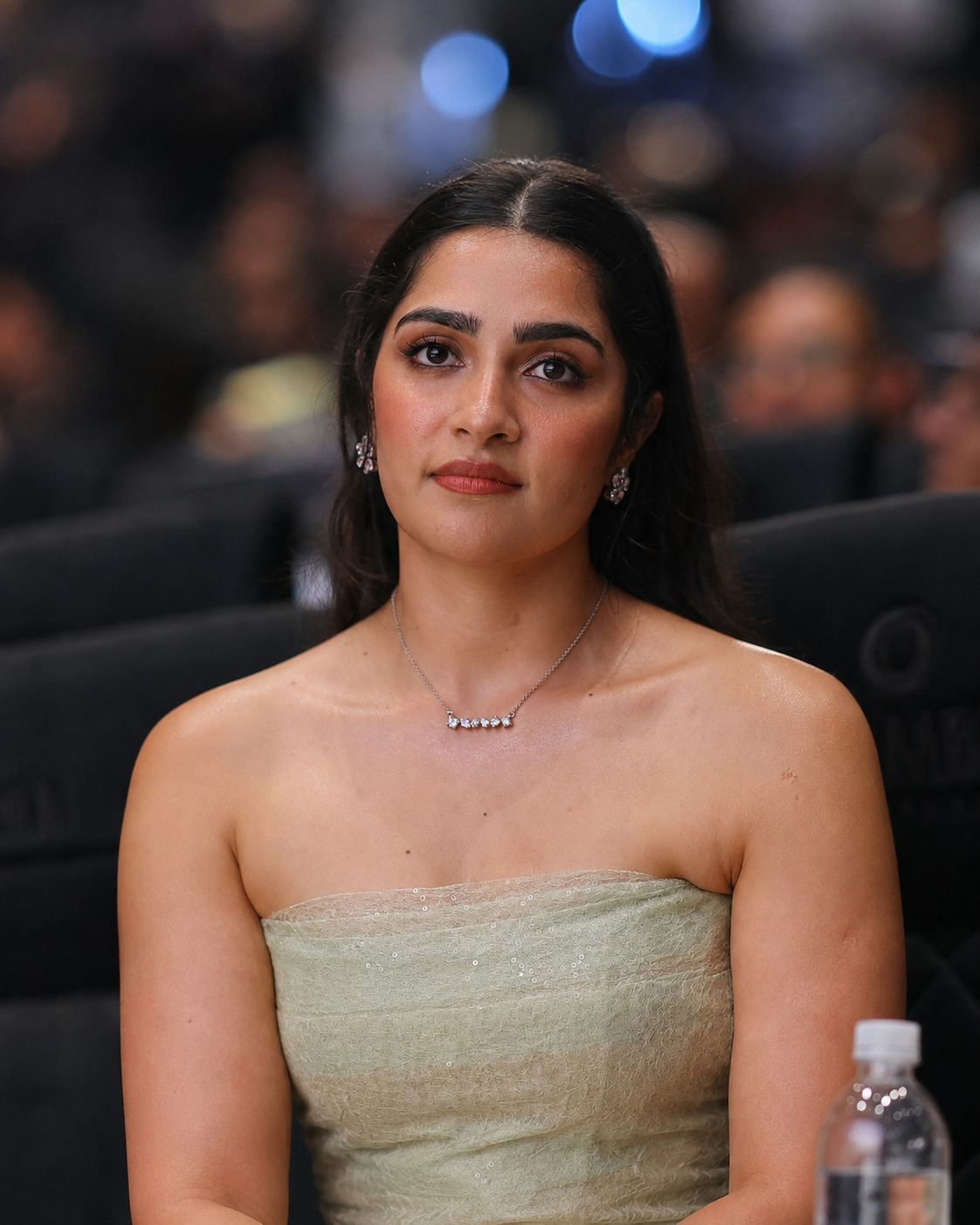
- Rukmini in 2026
- Born: Bengaluru, Karnataka, India
- Education: Royal Academy of Dramatic Arts, London
- Occupation: Actress
- Years active: 2019–present

Rukmini Vasanth is an Indian actress who primarily works in Kannada and Tamil films. She made her debut into films with the Kannada movie Birbal (2019). Rukmini had her acting breakthrough with the 2023 two-part Kannada romantic drama Sapta Saagaradaache Ello: Side A and Sapta Saagaradaache Ello: Side B for which she won the Filmfare Critics Award for Best Actress – Kannada. Her performance in the 2025 film Kantara: Chapter 1 was highly appreciated, with the film eventually becoming her most successful and highest-grossing film to date.

== Early life ==
Rukmini Vasanth was born into a Kannada family in Bengaluru. Her father, Colonel Vasanth Venugopal, is Karnataka's first recipient of India's highest peacetime military decoration, the Ashoka Chakra. He was killed in action in 2007 while preventing heavily armed Pakistani terrorists from Pakistan crossing the India-Pakistan border at Uri, Jammu and Kashmir. Her mother, Subhashini Vasanth, is an accomplished Bharatanatyam dancer who has set up a foundation, named Veer Ratna, to support war widows in Karnataka.

Rukmini was educated at Army School, Air Force School and Centre for Learning in Bangalore. She obtained an acting degree from the Royal Academy of Dramatic Arts in Bloomsbury, London.

== Career ==
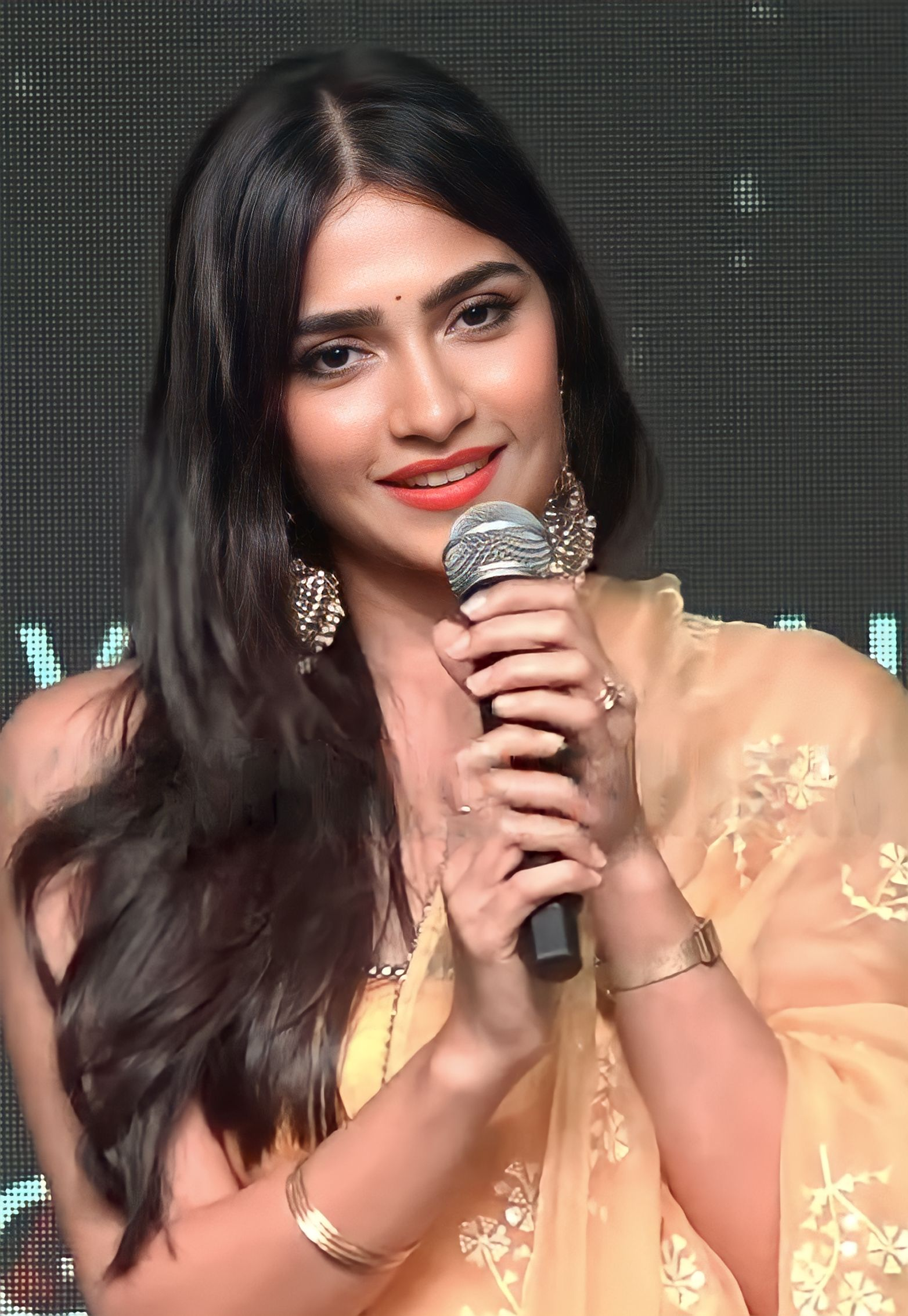
Rukmini in 2023

Rukmini made her debut with the 2019 Kannada film Birbal Trilogy opposite M. G. Srinivas.

Rukmini played Priya opposite Rakshit Shetty, in the 2023 films, Sapta Saagaradaache Ello – Side A and Sapta Saagaradaache Ello – Side B, which found commercial success. A. Sharadhaa of The New Indian Express noted, "Rukmini effortlessly emerges as the luminary, and she doles out a remarkable performance as Priya," For this role, she won the Filmfare Critics Award for Best Actress – Kannada. The same year, she appeared opposite Ganesh, in Baanadariyalli.

In 2024, Rukmini appeared in two successful Kannada films, Bagheera opposite Sriimurali, and Bhairathi Ranagal opposite Shiva Rajkumar. She also made her Telugu film debut with Appudo Ippudo Eppudo opposite Nikhil Siddhartha.

In 2025, she ventured into Tamil cinema with Ace, playing the role of Rukku opposite Vijay Sethupathi, and co-starring Sivakarthikeyan in Madharaasi, directed by A. R. Murugadoss. Both Ace and Madharaasi failed at the box office, though her performance was well received in both the films. The same year, she returned to Kannada cinema with the film Kantara: Chapter 1, a prequel to the film Kantara (2022). This became her highest grossing and most successful film; in a review of the film for The Hindu, Vivek M.V. stated: "Rukmini Vasanth, in her first role that pushes her abilities since the Sapta Sagaradaache Ello films, stands out with strong dialogue delivery."

In 2026, Rukmini appeared as Yash's wife in Geetu Mohandas's ensemble Toxic: A Fairy Tale for Grown-Ups. Despite becoming the fourth highest-grossing Kannada film of all-time, the film failed at the box-office.

== Filmography ==
Key
†	Denotes films that have not yet been released

List of Rukmini Vasanth film credits
Year	Title	Role	Language	Notes	Ref.
2019	Birbal Trilogy	Jahnvi	Kannada		
2019	Upstarts	NGO girl	Hindi		
2023	Sapta Saagaradaache Ello: Side A	Priya	Kannada		
2023	Sapta Saagaradaache Ello: Side B	Priya	Kannada		
2023	Baanadariyalli	Leela	Kannada		
2024	Bagheera	Dr. Sneha	Kannada		
2024	Bhairathi Ranagal	Dr. Vaishali	Kannada		
2024	Appudo Ippudo Eppudo	Tara	Telugu		
2025	Ace	Rukku	Tamil		
2025	Madharaasi	Malathy	Tamil		
2025	Kantara: Chapter 1	Kanakavathi	Kannada		
2026	Toxic	Mellisa	Kannada; English	Bilingual film	
2027	Dragon †	TBA	Telugu	Filming	
2027	NP51 †	TBA	Malayalam	Filming	
2027	Managla Gowri †	Gowri.R	Kannada	Filming	
2027	#Rukmini&Friends †	Thara	Tamil	Filming	

== Awards and nominations ==
Year	Award	Category	Work	Result	Ref.
2024	Filmfare Awards South	Best Actress – Kannada	Sapta Saagaradaache Ello (Note: Includes both Sapta Saagaradaache Ello – Side A and Sapta Saagaradaache Ello – Side B.)	Nominated	
2024	Filmfare Awards South	Best Actress Critics – Kannada	Sapta Saagaradaache Ello	Won	
2024	South Indian International Movie Awards	Best Actress – Kannada	Sapta Saagaradaache Ello – Side A	Nominated	
2024	South Indian International Movie Awards	Best Actress Critics – Kannada	Sapta Saagaradaache Ello – Side A	Won	
2024	IIFA Utsavam	Best Actress – Kannada	Sapta Saagaradaache Ello – Side A	Won	
2024	Chittara Star Awards	Best Actress	Sapta Saagaradaache Ello – Side A	Won	
2025	South Indian International Movie Awards	Best Actress – Kannada	Bhairathi Ranagal	Nominated	
2025	Filmfare Awards South	Best Actress – Kannada	Bagheera	Nominated	
2026	South Indian International Movie Awards	Best Actress – Kannada	Kantara: Chapter 1	Won	
