= Sapta Saagaradaache Ello: Side A =

2023 Indian film by Hemanth M. Rao

- Theatrical release poster
- Directed by: Hemanth M. Rao
- Written by: Gundu Shetty; Hemanth M. Rao
- Produced by: Rakshit Shetty
- Starring: Rakshit Shetty; Rukmini Vasanth
- Cinematography: Advaitha Gurumurthy
- Edited by: Sunil S. Bharadwaj; Hemanth M. Rao
- Music by: Charan Raj
- Production company: Paramvah Studios
- Distributed by: KVN Productions
- Release date: 1 September 2023
- Running time: 142 minutes
- Country: India
- Language: Kannada
- Box office: ₹20–26 crore

Sapta Saagaradaache Ello: Side A (Note: stylized as Sapta Saagaradaache Ello (Side-A)) (transl. "Somewhere Beyond the Seven Seas (Side A)") is a 2023 Indian Kannada-language romantic action drama film directed by Hemanth M. Rao and produced by Rakshit Shetty. It stars Rakshit Shetty and Rukmini Vasanth in lead roles. The music was composed by Charan Raj, the cinematography was handled by Advaitha Gurumurthy and edited by Sunil S. Bharadwaj and Hemanth M. Rao.

Sapta Saagaradaache Ello – Side A was released on 1 September 2023 to positive reviews from critics. A sequel titled Sapta Saagaradaache Ello: Side B was released on 17 November 2023.

== Plot ==
Manu is an innocent, simple man and a car driver for Shankregouda, a business tycoon. His lover is Priya, a college student with a passion for singing. She dreams of living in a beachside house with Manu and her family. Manu wants to fulfill his lady love's dream.

One day, Preetam, Shankregouda's son, drinks and drives, resulting in a man's death. To save his reputation, Shankregouda asks Manu to take the blame on himself and admit it in court. In return, Shankregouda would bail Manu out and give him anything he desired.

Thinking that he could make enough money for the beachside house if he acts according to Shankregouda, Manu accepts before the judge that he is guilty, much to Priya's disapproval and plea. With the assistance of Shankregouda's lawyers, efforts are made to bail Manu out. One morning, Shankregouda dies of a heart attack. His manager, Prabhu, who is greedy and corrupt, suggests to Shankregouda's wife that she not waste money on Manu as it was Shankregouda who had promised to help Manu, and she agrees.

Now Manu has neither the money nor the power to help himself. Meanwhile, Priya, desperate to free Manu, tries contacting Shankregouda's wife, lawyer, and Prabhu, but everyone ignores her. She sells some of her ornaments, hires a new lawyer for Manu's case, and even quits her education to earn money. In jail, Manu is being beaten up by Soma and his gang because he does not have anyone (Shankregouda) to back him up anymore. Because of this, he has a tough time. He later joins Patila and his team in weaving.

There are subtle moments of love expressed between the couple in jail through cassette tapes and meetings. Though Priya seems fine whenever she meets Manu in jail, she was slowly losing herself and getting depressed to the point where she stopped singing. Seeing this, Priya's mother visits Manu in jail and tells him to let Priya move on. Guilty, Manu writes a letter to Priya requesting that she let go of him and marry someone else as he could not be released anytime soon, and never stop singing. Priya, in denial, kept visiting the jail to meet Manu, but he never showed up. After an emotional turmoil, Priya gives up and agrees to marry someone else. Without knowing this, Manu, not being able to take it any longer without Priya, somehow ends up calling her, only for her brother to pick up the phone and let Manu know that Priya is getting married. On her wedding day, Soma's gang breaks the radio that Manu used to listen to Priya's cassette messages. Having given up everything, Manu revolts and gets severely beaten up.

Towards the end, a teaser for the sequel plays, where Manu gets out of jail 10 years later. Here he goes out for revenge and to find Priya again.

== Cast ==
- Rakshit Shetty as Manu
- Rukmini Vasanth as Priya
- Achyuth Kumar as Prabhu
- Avinash as Shankre Gowda
- Pavitra Lokesh as Priya's mother
- Sharath Lohithaswa as Patila
- Ramesh Indira as Soma
- Arjun Kaje as Preetham
- Rajesh S. Rao as Priya's father
- Gopalkrishna Deshpande as Prisoner
- Ashok Sharma as Prisoner
- Ashwin Hassan as Prisoner
- Sunil Kulkarni as Prisoner
- Anup Davann as Prisoner (Manu's alter ego)
- Havish Sreenath as Andy, assistant to music director Bhargava

== Soundtrack ==
Sapta Saagaradaache Ello – Side A

Soundtrack album by Charan Raj
- Released: 2023
- Recorded: 2023
- Studios: 2bq Studios, Audiokraft Studios
- Genre: Soundtrack
- Length: 23:16
- Label: Paramvah Music
- Producer: Charan Raj

Charan Raj soundtrack chronology
| Head Bush (2023) | Sapta Saagaradaache Ello – Side A (2023) | Sapta Saagaradaache Ello – Side B (2023) |
External audio
- Official Audio Jukebox on YouTube

Singles from Sapta Saagaradaache Ello – Side A
- 1. "Horaata" Released: July 20, 2023; 2. "Sapta Saagaradaache Ello Title Track" Released: Aug 08, 2023; 3. "Kadalanu" Released: Sep 07, 2023

Charan Raj composed the soundtrack and background score. The background score enhanced the output of the movie and all the songs of the movie were well received.

=== Songs ===
| No. | Title | Lyrics | Singer(s) | Length |
|---|---|---|---|---|
| 1. | "Horaata" | MC Bijju, Kiran Kaverappa | MC Bijju, Keerthan Holla | 03:12 |
| 2. | "Sapta Saagaradaache Ello Title Track" | Dhananjay Ranjan | Kapil Kapilan | 04:19 |
| 3. | "Kadalanu" | Nagarjuna Sharma | Srilakshmi Belmannu | 01:44 |
| 4. | "Kaala Kaayiso Kade" | Dhananjay Ranjan | Charan Raj | 04:50 |
| 5. | "Kanmareya Kaade" | Jayanth Kaikini | Shakthisree Gopalan, Narayana Sharma | 03:48 |
| 6. | "Saagaradaache" | Dhananjay Ranjan | Arun Kamath, Karthik Rao | 05:01 |

== Release ==
Sapta Saagaradaache Ello - Side A released on 1 September 2023, while the dubbed Telugu version titled Saptha Sagaralu Dhaati - Side A was released on 22 September 2023.

=== Home media ===
The film premiered on Amazon Prime Video on 29 September 2023 in Kannada with dubbed versions of Telugu, Tamil, Malayalam and Hindi languages.

== Reception ==
=== Box office ===
The film was reported to have grossed ₹2.3 - 2.6 crore on its first day and ₹2 crore on its second day. The film went on to gross ₹1.29 crore on its 4th day and ₹1.39 crore on its 5th day. During its theatrical run, the film grossed ₹20 crore at the box office.

=== Critical reception ===
Sapta Saagaradaache Ello - Side A received critical acclaim for its storytelling, acting, cinematography and technical aspects. On the review aggregator website Rotten Tomatoes, 100% of 5 critics' reviews are positive, with an average rating of 7.3/10.

Priyanka Sundar of Firstpost gave 4/5 stars and called the film "Poignant, immersive and heart wrenching." Sridevi. S of The Times of India gave 3.5/5 stars and wrote "SSE is an amalgamation of fine performances and rich technical values, which makes it a must-watch."

A Sharadhaa of The New Indian Express gave 3.5/5 stars and wrote "A profound portrait of love. Its an intense love story with a poetic narrative and this film is a sincere love story, there is no attempt to force songs into it. There is simplicity in the dialogue that accentuates the depth of the lines."

M. Vivek of The Hindu wrote "Sapta Sagaradaache Ello is a film that doesn’t end in theatres; the epic love story offers an immersive experience that keeps you wanting more." Baradwaj Rangan told in his review that "’Sapta Saagaradaache Ello – Side A’ is a beautifully understated and very real romance, with dashes of a very real kind of poetry."

== See also ==
- Sapta Saagaradaache Ello: Side B
