= Thanupp =

Indian film

- Directed by: Ragesh Narayanan
- Written by: Ragesh Narayanan
- Produced by: Anu Ananthan; Dr. Lakshmi
- Starring: Nidheesh Nambiar; Jibiya T. C.; Kuttikkal Jayachandran; Arun Kumar; Aaru Bala
- Cinematography: Manikandan P. S.
- Edited by: Safdar Merva
- Music by: Bibin Ashok
- Production company: Kashi Cinemas
- Release date: 4 October 2024
- Country: India
- Language: Malayalam

Thanupp is a 2024 Indian Malayalam-language film, written and directed by Ragesh Narayanan, in his directorial debut. The film introduces Nidheesh Nambiar and Jibiya T. C. in lead roles. The film was released on 4 October 2024.

== Plot ==
Pratheesh and Treesa, a young couple, arrive in a picturesque village surrounded by hills and rivers. With the help of local villager Prakashan, they settle into a rented room, and Pratheesh earns a living as a painter working alongside Prakashan. Although the villagers warm up to the couple, they sense something mysterious about them. Their suspicions grow when Pratheesh and Treesa inquire about a specific river location and are spotted visiting it at night.

One evening, a local discovers their nocturnal visits and shares the information with friends over drinks. Determined to uncover the truth, the group decides to follow the couple and catch them in the act. They track Pratheesh and Treesa into the forest near the river, record a video of their intimate moment, and share it with the entire village. The couple's private moment becomes public, leaving them ashamed and reclusive.

When Prakash learns about the rumor, he gathers the group and reveals the couple's story. Pratheesh and Treesa's relationship began when Pratheesh returned Treesa's lost dog, Oreo. Despite resistance from both families due to their different backgrounds, the couple eloped and registered their marriage. However, their happiness is short-lived, as they struggle with infertility issues. After consulting various doctors, they meet a village curer who suggests an unconventional solution to conceive.

The group, realizing their mistake, tries to make amends but finds the couple's room locked. Tragically, Pratheesh and Treesa take their own lives by drowning in the river. The next morning, a local newspaper reveals that Treesa was pregnant, adding a poignant twist to the story. The film concludes with Pratheesh and Treesa in the afterlife, expecting a baby, highlighting the societal pressure on couples to conceive and gain acceptance.

== Cast ==
- Nidheesh Nambiar as Pratheesh
- Jibiya T. C. as Treesa
- Koottickal Jayachandran as Prakash
- Arun Kumar as Santhosh
- Aaru Bala as Thamizhan
- Satheesh Gopi as Shyju
- Prinu Padiyoor as Unni
- Ratheesh Iritty as Ratheesh
- Radhakrishnan as Mani
- Madhu as Thankachan
- Shiny Sarah as Pratheesh's mother
- Padmanabhan as Pratheesh's father
- K. S. Gopinath as Vaidyan
- Samjeevan as Treesa's father
- Ranjith M. as Treesa's uncle
- Daseema as Treesa's aunty

== Production ==
Ragesh Narayanan, known for his work as cinematographer in films like White Boys (2015), Hallelooya (2016) and Neeraja (2023), became independent film director with Thanupp and Bibin Ashok, an assistant to music director Bijibal, was signed as music director of the same film, which is bank rolled by Anu Ananthan and Dr. Lakshmi. Interestingly, Manikandan P. S. was signed as the cinematographer of the film, though the director himself is a known cameraman.

The film was shot at several locations of Kannur district, Wayanad district, Ernakulam district, Chennai district and Kodagu district. The first look poster was released on 15 February 2024. Actors Aju Varghese and Anaswara Rajan released the trailer on 23 September 2024. The film has won several accolades at film festivals.
