= Ace (film) =

- Theatrical release poster
- Directed by: Arumuga Kumar
- Written by: Arumuga Kumar
- Produced by: Arumuga Kumar
- Starring: Vijay Sethupathi; Rukmini Vasanth
- Cinematography: Karan B. Rawat
- Edited by: Fenny Oliver
- Music by: Soundtrack: Justin Prabhakaran; Sam C. S. Background score: Sam C. S.
- Production company: 7Cs Entertainment
- Release date: 23 May 2025
- Running time: 154 minutes
- Country: India
- Language: Tamil

Ace is a 2025 Indian Tamil-language romantic crime comedy film written, produced and directed by Arumuga Kumar. It stars Vijay Sethupathi and Rukmini Vasanth, alongside Yogi Babu, B. S. Avinash and Babloo Prithiveeraj.

Kumar's 7Cs Entertainment officially announced the film in May 2023 under the tentative title Vijay Sethupathi 51, as it is the actor's 51st film as the lead actor, and the official title was announced a year later. Principal photography took place predominantly in Malaysia from May to November 2023. The film has music composed by Justin Prabhakaran and Sam C. S., Sam C. S. also composed background score, cinematography handled by Karan B. Rawat and editing by Fenny Oliver.

Ace premiered on 22 May 2025 in India, and was theatrically released worldwide on 23 May. The film was a box-office bomb.

== Plot ==
Kannan, a charismatic but enigmatic man, arrives in Malaysia to escape a shadowy criminal past, adopting the alias "Bolt" Kannan. He befriends Arivu, a ragpicker who poses as a wealthy businessman to impress his girlfriend, Kalpana, providing comic relief. Kannan meets Rukmini, called Rukku for short. She is a determined young woman working odd jobs to reclaim her late parents’ house from her abusive stepfather, Rajadurai, a corrupt police officer. Meanwhile, Rajadurai coerces Preethi, a young woman into having sex with him in return for not posting her intimate video online without her consent.

Kannan and Rukku get romantically involved. As Rukku in a financial predicament due to Rajadurai, and is also under threat of losing her job, Kannan decides to get a loan of RM1,000,000 to help her. Together with Arivu, he goes to a dockyard owned by Dharma, a ruthless loan shark. Kannan joins a table of poker and expertly starts to rack up his wins. As the stakes rise, Dharma himself joins the table to challenge Kannan and wins by rigging the game. Now stuck with his own debt on top of Rukku's financial crisis, Kannan decides to rob an armored truck delivering cash to the bank. Kannan fights and evades the police, stealing RM20,000,000 (₹403,927,600 (US$4.2 million)). The police arrest Dharma after finding his partial fingerprint on the magazine from the gun that Kannan used in the heist. A flashback reveals that Kannan stole Dharma's gun from his club. Coincidentally, Kannan then finds out that he has won RM20,000,000 from the lottery as well. Kannan and Arivu request Kalpana to collect the lottery in order to not be seen in the public eye in the aftermath of the heist. Kalpana overhears a conversation between Kannan and Arivu about the bank heist, and they are forced to show her the stolen money.

Kannan books Rukku a Rolls-Royce Phantom, buys her a dress, and invites her to a hotel. He decides to settle Rukku's debt by paying RM1,000,000 (₹20,196,380 (US$210,000)) from his lottery winnings, to Rajadurai at the hotel. However, Rajadurai recognises Kannan as the culprit behind the bank heist, because Kannan had shot him in the leg during the robbery. Rajadurai talks with Kannan privately and reveals that he wants to keep the money, the house and Rukku since he has desired her from a young age. Assuming Kannan has managed to convert all the stolen money into unmarked bills, he takes the RM1,000,000 and tells him to deliver the rest to his house. Soon, Kannan and Arivu are thrust into a chaotic chase, pursued by Dharma's goons after Arivu reveals in fear that Kannan framed Dharma and stole the money. Dharma also tells Kannan that he wants all of the stolen money.

Rukku finds the stolen money at Kannan's flat and realises that Kalpana and Arivu were already aware. Kannan reveals to Rukku that Rajadurai was on duty on the day of the bank heist and reveals privately to Rukku what Rajadurai told him.

Kannan devises an ingenious plan to trap Dharma and Rajadurai. He tells Kalpana to seduce Rajadurai at the pub, and also tells Rukku to go to the police and report Rajadurai for domestic abuse. At Rajadurai's house, Kannan fights and kills Dharma and his goons. Eventually, Rajadurai comes home to find the stolen money and dead bodies. Kannan incapacitates him and leaves with the RM1,000,000, leaving behind half of the stolen money. Meanwhile, Kalpana places the rest of the stolen money in Dharma's vehicle. Rukku enters her house to find Rajadurai, plays a gunshot sound on her phone, making it seem like Rajadurai has fired at her. The police promptly arrive and shoot Rajadurai dead. Preethi is relieved upon seeing news of Rajadurai's demise. The police conclude their investigation and reveal to the media that there was a scuffle between Dharma and Rajadurai, leading to their deaths, and that all of the stolen money was recovered from their possessions.

Kannan, Arivu, Rukku and Kalpana are shown to have escaped successfully, celebrating with the lottery winnings. Meanwhile, Arivu is informed that the real "Bolt" Kannan never arrived in Malaysia, thus realising that he has befriended a fraudster. When he asks “Kannan” for his real identity, he simply smiles as the credits roll.

== Cast ==
- Vijay Sethupathi as Ace alias "Bolt" Kannan
- Rukmini Vasanth as Rukku
- Yogi Babu as Arivukarasan "Arivu"
- B. S. Avinash as Dharma
- Babloo Prithiveeraj as Rajadurai
- Divya Pillai as Kalpana
- Rajkumar as Raju
- Ramesh Thilak as Chidambaram
- P. L. Thenappan as Chidambaram's dad
- Alvin Martin as Dharma's Henchman
- Denes Kumar as Police officer

== Production ==
On 20 May 2023, 7Cs Entertainment officially announced that they would collaborate with director Aarumuga Kumar and Vijay Sethupathi. Both the director and actor previously collaborated for Oru Nalla Naal Paathu Solren (2017). Tentatively titled Vijay Sethupathi 51, Rukmini Vasanth was cast as the female lead, in her Tamil debut. Yogi Babu was also cast in a prominent role. Principal photography began the same month, and wrapped by 30 November. It was predominantly shot in Malaysia. The film's official title, Ace, was announced on 17 May 2024. Cinematographer Karan B. Rawat, editor R. Govindaraj and production designer A. K. Muthu were revealed to be a part of the technical crew. Fenny Oliver later took over editing.

== Music ==
Ace

Soundtrack album by Justin Prabhakaran
- Genre: Feature film soundtrack
- Language: Tamil
- Label: Think Music
- Producer: Justin Prabhakaran

Justin Prabhakaran chronology
Irugapatru (2023)	Ace (2025)	Hridayapoorvam (2025)

Sam C. S chronology
Jack (2025)	Ace (2025)	Phoenix (2025)

Singles from Ace
- 1. "Urugudhu Urugudhu" Released: 17 March 2025

The film has songs composed by Justin Prabhakaran and background scored by Sam C. S. The film's only single "Urugudhu Urugudhu" was released on 17 March 2025.

No.	Title	Lyrics	Music	Singer(s)	Length
1.	"Urugudhu Urugudhu"	Thamarai	Justin Prabhakaran	Kapil Kapilan, Shreya Ghoshal
2.	"Poka Rap"	Iykki Berry	Sam C. S.	Iykki Berry
3.	"Paarvai Thani"	Karthik Netha	Sam C. S.	Kapil Kapilan
4.	"Money Speaks"	MC Vickey	Justin Prabhakaran	MC Vickey, Snigdha Chandra
5.	"Ace Anthem"	Ratty Adhiththan	Justin Prabhakaran	Ratty Adhiththan
6.	"Mama Dhama"	Vetti Paiyan Venkat, Arumuga Kumar, Chella Vel Pandian	Justin Prabhakaran	Anthony Daasan, Kaali Venkat

== Release ==
=== Theatrical ===
Ace premiered in India on 22 May 2025, and was released worldwide on 23 May.

=== Home media ===
Ace began streaming on Amazon Prime Video from 13 June 2025.

== Reception ==
=== Box office ===
The film collected ₹7 crore (equivalent to ₹7.2 crore or US$750,000 in 2026) in 10 days. Sethupathi admitted that the film's release was rushed and lacked publicity, blaming these factors for the underperformance.

=== Critical response ===
M Suganth of The Times of India gave 3/5 stars and wrote, "Ace is the kind of film which can be enjoyed best when we enter the theatre sans our thinking cap.[...] Even if the first half is filled with quite a few flat moments, the gradual blooming of romance between Vijay Sethupathi and Rukmini Vasanth adds some emotional weight to a largely non-serious story that seems to be going in all directions." Avinash Ramachandran of Cinema Express gave 3/5 stars and wrote, "Ace isn't just a star vehicle. It isn't a social commentary. It isn't dealing with pertinent themes. It isn't aiming to cater to realism and logic. [...] Ace might not have completely aced it, but it tries its best." Janani K of India Today rated the film 2.5/5 stars and wrote, "The film works best when embracing its heist thriller elements, but struggles to maintain consistency across its runtime, ultimately delivering an experience that feels more like a missed opportunity." Latha Srinivasan of Hindustan Times gave 2.5/5 stars and wrote "Ace is a fun, mindless heist film that's largely entertaining, thanks to the Vijay Sethupathi-Yogi Babu combo, which brings the laughs."
