= Manidhargal =

2025 Tamil language film by Raam Indhra

- Manidhargal film poster
- Directed by: Raam Indhra
- Written by: Raam Indhra
- Produced by: Rajendra Prasad; Naveen; M.K.Sambasivam
- Starring: Kapil Velavan; Dasha; Arjun Dev Saravanan; Gunavanthan; Sambasivan
- Cinematography: Ajay Abraham George
- Edited by: Dinsa
- Music by: Anilesh L Mathew
- Production companies: Studio Moving Turtle; Sri Krish Pictures
- Release date: 30 May 2025
- Running time: 106 minutes
- Country: India
- Language: Tamil

Manidhargal (transl. Humans) is a 2025 Indian Tamil language drama thriller film directed by debutant Raam Indhra starring Kapil Velavan, Dasha, Arjun Dev Saravanan, Gunavanthan and Sambasivan. This film was made through crowdfunding by friends.

== Plot ==
The film revloves around six friends who get drunk together and get caught in a trap, where the friends struggle emotionally and physically to overcome the struggle.

== Cast ==
- Kapil Velavan as 'Karli' Pandi
- Daksha as Sathis
- Arjun Dev Saravanan as Deepan
- Gunavanthan as Mano
- Sambasivam as Chandru

== Production ==
The film is produced by Rajendra Prasad, Naveen and M.K.Sambasivam under the banners of Studio Moving Turtle and Sri Krish Pictures. Principal photography took place entirely in Dindigul. The film features debutant actors, Kapil Velavan, Dasha, Arjun Dev Saravanan, Gunavanthan, Sambasivan and others while the technical team consists of cinematographer Ajay Abraham George, editor Dinsa and music composer Anilesh L Mathew.

== Music ==
The film has music composed by Anilesh L Mathew.

== Release ==
Manidhargal released on 30 May 2025.

== Reception ==
The Times of India highlighted the film's intriguing setup and the psychological tension that unfolds over the course of one night. It appreciated the filmmakers' effort to maintain suspense and deliver a thought-provoking thriller. Dina Thanthi noted that the ensemble cast delivered emotionally charged performances, and the confined setting added to the sense of urgency and drama. The review appreciated the film's focus on how a single incident can alter relationships and test personal morals. Abhinav Subramanian of The Times of India gave 1.5/5 stars and wrote "Director Raam Indhra loads his cast with actors who look like small-time thugs, yet they react to their predicament with the emotional fortitude of frightened children. Road movie tropes pile up predictably: near-accidents, fuel shortages, paranoid phone calls, while the overacting reaches seizure-inducing levels." Hindu Tamil Thisai lauded the film's cinematography and music, describing it as a bold attempt to explore guilt, fear, and friendship. The review particularly highlighted the night-time visuals and immersive score as key elements in building suspense.
