= Firefly (2025 film) =

2025 Indian Kannada-language drama film

- Theatrical release poster
- Directed by: Vamshi Krishna Srinivas
- Written by: Vamshi Krishna Srinivas
- Produced by: Niveditha Shivarajkumar
- Starring: Vamshi Krishna Srinivas; Rachana Inder; Achyuth Kumar; Sudharani
- Cinematography: Abhilash Kalathi
- Edited by: Suresh Arumugam
- Music by: Charan Raj
- Production companies: Sree Mutthu Cine Services and Productions
- Release date: 24 April 2025
- Running time: 132 minutes
- Country: India
- Language: Kannada

Firefly is a 2025 Indian Kannada-language drama film written and directed by debutant Vamshi Krishna Srinivas, who also stars in the lead role. Produced by Niveditha Shivarajkumar, under her debut production venture Sri Mutthu. the film features Achyuth Kumar, Sudharani Anand Ninasam and Rachana Inder in key roles. The film explores themes of grief, loneliness, and self-discovery through a non-linear narrative. It was released in theatres on 24 April 2025, coinciding with the birth anniversary of Dr. Rajkumar, the matinee idol of Kannada Cinema.

== Plot ==
Vivekananda, nicknamed Vicky (Vamshi Krishna Srinivas), returns to India from the United States after four years. He faces a tragedy with the death of his parents, Murthy (Achyuth Kumar) and Padma (Sudharani). After falling into a coma for three months, Vicky loses his job and struggles with depression, insomnia, and irritability. His surreal journey to cope with grief leads him to meet Neha (Rachana Inder) through a dating app, whose pragmatic outlook contrasts with his emotional turmoil. Using a reverse screenplay, the film depicts Vicky’s introspective path to self-discovery, blending quirky humor and emotional drama.

== Cast ==
- Vamshi Krishna Srinivas as Vivekananda aka Vicky, a melancholic young man dealing with grief
- Achyuth Kumar as Murthy, Vicky’s father
- Sudharani as Padma, Vicky’s mother
- Anand Ninasam as Vicky’s Uncle
- Sheetal Shetty as Counselor
- Rachana Inder as Neha, a woman Vicky meets through a dating app
- Moogu Suresh as Rajanna
- Sundar as Venky
- Veena Sundar as Jyoti
- Sihi Kahi Chandru as Doctor Chandru
- Chitkala Biradar
- Shivarajkumar as Pizza delivery man (cameo appearance)

== Production ==
Firefly marks the directorial and acting debut of Vamshi Krishna Srinivas, who also wrote the screenplay. The film was produced by Niveditha Shivarajkumar, daughter of Shivarajkumar, marking her first venture as a producer. Announced in June 2023, the project was launched with a ceremonial event attended by Shivarajkumar, who later filmed a cameo. Filming occurred in multiple schedules, with the first completed by September 2023 and the entire production wrapped by August 2024. Cinematography was by Abhilash Kalathi, music by Charan Raj, and editing by Suresh Arumugam.

== Release and Reception ==
Firefly was released in theatres across Karnataka on 24 April 2025. Critics gave mixed reviews, praising its visual style and innovative storytelling but noting uneven emotional depth. The Hindu described it as a “visually experimental character study” but criticized its flat dialogues. The Times of India rated it 3.5/5, calling it a “refreshing take on handling loneliness and grief.” India Today highlighted its light-hearted depiction of depression and praised the supporting cast. Conversely, OTTplay noted that the film prioritized style over substance.
