= Byri =

- Theatrical release poster
- Directed by: John Glady
- Written by: John Glady
- Based on: Byri by John Glady
- Produced by: V. Durai Raj
- Starring: Syed Majeed; Meghana Ellen; Viji Sekar; John Glady
- Cinematography: A. V. Vasantha Kumar
- Edited by: R. S. Sathish Kumar
- Music by: Arun Raj
- Production company: DK Productions
- Release date: 23 February 2024
- Country: India
- Language: Tamil

Byri is a 2024 Indian Tamil-language action drama film directed by John Glady and starring himself, Syed Majeed, Meghana Ellen and, Viji Sekar with the music by Arun Raj. The film is about pigeon racing in Nagercoil, and it was released on 23 February 2024 to mixed-to-positive reviews from critics but couldn't perform well at the box office.

== Cast ==
- Syed Majeed as Rajalingam
- Meghana Ellen as Sharon
- Viji Sekar as Saraswathi Ammal
- John Glady as Amal
- Saranya Ravichandran
- Ramesh Arumugam as Ramesh Pannaiyar
- Vinu Lawrence as Suyambu
- Anand
- Karthick Prasanna
- Francis Kiruba
- Rajan

== Production ==
The film is based on John Glady's short film of the same name that he made for Naalaya Iyakkunar. Locals from Nagercoil played supporting roles.

== Reception ==
A critic from The Times of India rated the film three out of five stars and wrote that "It is this world building that is the biggest strength of Byri, which has the rootedness of Vetri Maaran's Aadukalam and Vada Chennai (AV Vasantha Kumar's realistic visuals help here), a bunch of raw actors like in Angamaly Diaries, and the energy of City Of God". A critic from Times Now gave the film the same rating and wrote that "might get off to a slow start but it certainly does end with a flourish". A critic from Cinema Express rated the film 2 1/2 out of 5 stars and wrote that "While the majority of the film is fairly engaging, it also unfortunately has some problematic elements that turn out to be major roadblocks. The film, despite revolving around pigeon racing, lacks a genuine love between the men and their birds".
