= Sapta Saagaradaache Ello: Side B =

2023 Indian film by Hemanth M. Rao

- Theatrical release poster
- Directed by: Hemanth M. Rao
- Written by: Gundu Shetty; Hemanth M. Rao
- Produced by: Rakshit Shetty
- Starring: Rakshit Shetty; Rukmini Vasanth; Chaithra J Achar
- Cinematography: Advaitha Gurumurthy
- Edited by: Sunil S. Bharadwaj; Hemanth M. Rao
- Music by: Charan Raj
- Production company: Paramvah Studios
- Distributed by: see below
- Release date: 17 November 2023
- Running time: 147 minutes
- Country: India
- Language: Kannada

Sapta Saagaradaache Ello: Side B (Note: stylized as Sapta Saagaradaache Ello (Side-B)) (transl. "Somewhere Beyond the Seven Seas (Side B)") is a 2023 Indian Kannada-language romantic action drama co-written and directed by Hemanth M. Rao and produced by Rakshit Shetty. It is the sequel to the Sapta Saagaradaache Ello – Side A. It stars Rakshit Shetty, Rukmini Vasanth and Chaithra J Achar in the lead roles. The music was composed by Charan Raj, while the cinematography was handled by Advaitha Gurumurthy and editing by Sunil S. Bharadwaj and Hemanth M. Rao.

The movie was released on 17 November 2023.

== Plot ==
In 2021, after 10 years from the events of Side A and during the COVID-19 pandemic, Manu is out of prison and in search of Priya. He comes across Surabhi, a kind-hearted call girl, in between and gets help from Prakasha. Then he finds that Priya is not happy in her marriage as her husband has lost his restaurant business due to COVID-19. Manu tries to fix the financial and emotional situation of Priya's family along with facing hurdles from Soma and his gang with whom he had a feud in prison, which resulted in Soma almost losing his hearing. Manu dies in the end.

== Cast ==
- Rakshit Shetty as Manu
- Rukmini Vasanth as Priya
- Chaithra J Achar as Surabhi
- Achyuth Kumar as Prabhu
- J. P. Thuminad as Deepak, Priya's husband
- Ramesh Indira as Soma
- Gopalkrishna Deshpande as Prakash
- Bharath G. B. as Vinodha
- Yamuna Srinidhi

== Soundtrack ==
Sapta Saagaradaache Ello – Side B

Soundtrack album by Charan Raj
- Released: October 3, 2024
- Recorded: 2023
- Studios: 2bq Studios, Audiokraft Studios
- Genre: Soundtrack
- Label: Paramvah Music
- Producer: Charan Raj

Charan Raj soundtrack chronology
Sapta Saagaradaache Ello – Side A (2023)	Sapta Saagaradaache Ello – Side B (2024)	Bad Manners (2023)

Singles from Sapta Saagaradaache Ello – Side B
- 1. "Olave Olave" Released: Oct 31, 2023; 2. "Sapta Saagaradaache Ello Title Track" Released: Nov 10, 2023; 3. "Dhare Neeneedidaasare" Released: Nov 21, 2023; 4. "Usire" Released: Nov 24, 2023; 5. "Gaju Koodide" Released: Dec 02, 2023

Charan Raj composed the soundtrack and background score.

=== Songs ===
No.	Title	Lyrics	Singer(s)	Length
1.	"Usire"	Dhananjay Ranjan	Sanjith Hegde	04:26
2.	"Gaju Koodide"	Dhananjay Ranjan	Charan Raj	02:15
3.	"Dhare Neeneedidaasare"	Rakshit Shetty	K. S. Harisankar	02:33
4.	"Olave Olave"	B R Suvarna Sharma	Srilakshmi Belamannu	03:17
5.	"Sapta Saagaradaache Ello Title Track"	Dhananjay Ranjan	Karthik Chennoji Rao	04:52
6.	"Gaali Geethe"	Nagarjun Sharma	Job Kurian	03:41
7.	"Kadalanu"	Nagarjun Sharma	Srilakshmi Belmannu	05:23

== Release ==
=== Theatrical ===
Sapta Sagaradaache Ello (Side B), was originally set for release on October 20, 2023, but was rescheduled. The movie was released theatrically on 17 November 2023 in Kannada, Telugu, Tamil and Malayalam.

=== Distribution ===
KVN Productions released the Kannada version, People Media Factory released the Telugu version, Karthik Subbaraj's Stone Bench Creations presented the Tamil version and Prithviraj Productions released the Malayalam version.

=== Home media ===
The film premiered on Amazon Prime Video on 25 January 2024 in Kannada with dubbed versions of Telugu, Tamil and Malayalam languages.

== Reception ==
Sapta Saagaradaache Ello - Side B received positive to mixed reviews with praise for its storytelling, acting, cinematography and technical aspects while the characterization of the lead was criticized. The movie also had a rich production values which was appreciated by many.

Writing for The Times of India, Sridevi S wrote "If Side-A is a one-sided love letter, Side-B is a fitting response to that letter. If you have seen Side A, Side B is worth watching in theatres to find how life comes full circle for Manu and Priya. If you haven't watched Side A, Side B still serves as a sublime story to see how far a person can go for love".

Vivek MV of The Hindu in his review wrote "Director Hemanth M Rao puts his lead character in a flawed and morally wrong path, yet soulful performances from Rakshit, Chaithra J Achar and Rukmini Vasanth overshadows the film's convenient writing."

Shashiprasad of The South First rated the movie 4 out of 5 stars and wrote "All is well that ends well! Amidst all the action films presently trending in Indian cinema, Sapta Sagaradaache Ello is a relief as one of the finest love stories on the silver screen."

The Deccan Herald was critical of the film, finding it showed "slick production values in a sluggish sequel" In a similar review Swaroop Kodur of OTTPlay appreciated the technical aspects of the movie and acting of the leads while criticism towards the writing of characters, which The New Indian Express similarly did.

== See also ==
- Sapta Saagaradaache Ello – Side A
