= Kaaki Sattai (2015 film) =

2015 Indian film by R. S. Durai Senthilkumar

- Theatrical release poster
- Directed by: R. S. Durai Senthilkumar
- Screenplay by: Pattukkottai Prabakar(Dialogues); R. S. Durai Senthilkumar
- Story by: R. S. Durai Senthilkumar
- Produced by: Dhanush
- Starring: Sivakarthikeyan; Sri Divya
- Cinematography: M. Sukumar
- Edited by: Vivek Harshan
- Music by: Anirudh Ravichander
- Production company: Wunderbar Films
- Distributed by: Escape Artists Motion Pictures
- Release date: 27 February 2015
- Running time: 156 minutes
- Country: India
- Language: Tamil

Kaaki Sattai (transl. Khaki Shirt) is a 2015 Indian Tamil-language action comedy film directed by R. S. Durai Senthilkumar and produced by Dhanush under Wunderbar Films. The film stars Sivakarthikeyan and Sri Divya, with Prabhu and Vijay Raaz in supporting roles. It revolves around a police constable who wants to prove himself as a true, powerful police officer by finding ways to solve issues of corruption in the law-and-order system in the department of police.

Principal photography commenced in March 2014 and wrapped that September. The music was composed by Anirudh Ravichander, cinematography was handled by M. Sukumar, and editing by Vivek Harshan. The film was released on 27 February 2015.

== Plot ==
Mathimaran is a police constable who only reports to work and goes home daily without contributing anything useful to society, as his boss, Inspector Sathyamurthy, does not want to get on the wrong side of the upper levels of the police, who are corrupt and politically influenced, and is also unwilling to rock the present system due to past experience. As a result, Mathimaran and his fellow policemen never get any cases, much to his irritation.

Mathimaran falls in love with Divya, a nurse, but hides his occupation from her as her family hates police officers. With her help, he finds out about an illegal organ donation racket orchestrated by a politician named Durai Arasan and Dr. Devasagayam, who is the chairman of the hospital where Divya works. They capture sick and injured migrant workers from North India, make them brain dead by administering them carbon monoxide instead of oxygen, and then harvest their organs, which they sell abroad for huge amounts of money. The organ donation scam gives Mathimaran his first real case, and he takes it on with enthusiasm after Sathyamurthy and Durai's estranged father Singaperumal, who had threatened to expose his son's misdeeds, are killed in a bomb blast orchestrated by Durai.

Mathimaran first confronts Devasagayam, who commits suicide, but not before admitting his role in the scam and giving detailed information about it. He then decides to confront Durai and get him arrested, but the problem is that there is not enough evidence against Durai except Devasagayam's word, and Devasagayam is dead. He tries to get more information about Durai's role in the scam incognito. Unfortunately, Durai soon finds out that Mathimaran is after him, and a cat-and-mouse game begins. In the process, Mathimaran is suspended from duty, as the police commissioner is close to Durai. Undaunted, he exposes the scam and Durai's involvement to the media, but Durai wriggles out of arrest.

Mathimaran decides to finish off Durai to end the scam once and for all. He creates a ruckus during a felicitation function for Durai. In the chaos that ensues, he shoots Durai and gives him the same treatment that had been meted out to the North Indian workers: administering carbon monoxide to him and then harvesting his organs after he is declared brain dead. Durai's death is covered up as a terrorist attack. Mathimaran is eventually promoted to Inspector in reward for his efforts in thwarting the organ donation scam. He also gets accepted by Divya's family, despite being a police officer, and marries Divya.

== Cast ==
- Sivakarthikeyan as Constable Mathimaran Rathnavel, later Inspector
- Prabhu as Inspector Sathyamurthy
- Sri Divya as Divya
- Vijay Raaz as Durai Arasan
- Daffe Naveen as Mathimaran's friend
- Kalpana as Meenakshi, Mathimaran's mother
- Yog Japee as Dr. Devasagayam
- Manobala as Jyothi Lingam
- Mayilsamy as Sankara Narayanan alias Cyber Sanki / Sankiji Swamy
- Imman Annachi as Constable Samarasam
- E. Ramdoss as Sub-Inspector Subramanian
- Nagineedu as Singaperumal, Durai Arasan's father
- Sujatha Sivakumar as Divya's mother
- Rail Ravi as Divya's father
- Yuvina Parthavi as Swetha, Divya's niece
- Vidyullekha Raman as Divya's friend
- Jeeva Ravi as Commissioner
- Suchithra Shivaraman as Mathimaran's sister
- Jangiri Madhumitha as Call Girl
- Yogi Babu as Hobo
- Besant Ravi as Ravi
- Sampath Ram as Sampath
- Singapore Deepan as Cyber Sanki teammate
- Raveendran
- Suryakanth
- Ravi Venkatraman
- Manohar
- Diwakar
- Douglas Moorthy
- Dhivya Raaven

== Production ==
After the success of Ethir Neechal (2013), it was announced that the same team including producer Dhanush, director R. S. Durai Senthilkumar and actor Sivakarthikeyan would collaborate for another venture. The film was initially titled Taana, and when asked about whether the film would undergo a name change, Sivakarthikeyan clarified that the production unit was thinking of various possibilities and that if a suitable title did not come up, Taana would be retained. However, it was changed to Kaaki Sattai, after a 1985 film. The producers of the 1985 film were approached to obtain the rights for the title.

Senthilkumar revealed that he had written the script keeping Dhanush in mind while working as an assistant director for Aadukalam (2011). He narrated the script to Dhanush but failed to materialise; after Sivakarthikeyan was cast, he tweaked the script to suit Sivakarthikeyan's comic timing. Sri Divya, who last paired with Sivakarthikeyan in Varuthapadatha Valibar Sangam (2013), was again selected as the lead actress. She interacted with nurses to prepare for her role of a nurse. Vinu Damodar, a Koothu-P-Pattarai actor, was selected to play a small but significant role, making his film debut. Manobala was selected to play a supporting role, in his first collaboration with Sivakarthikeyan.

Sivakarthikeyan said the film would, in contrast to the films of modern Tamil action heroes, feature realistic stunt sequences. Principal photography began on 6 March 2014 at Pammal. By May 2014, the film completed 12 days shooting in an apartment in and around Chennai. By June 2014, significant portions had been completed, and some sequences were shot at Binny Mills. In September 2014, filming took place in Norway. Filming wrapped later the same month.

== Music ==
Anirudh Ravichander composed the soundtrack. The song "I'm So Cool" is Sivakarthikeyan's third attempt at singing, after the title track of Varuthapadatha Valibar Sangam (2013) and "Royapuram Peter" from Maan Karate (2014). The audio rights are held by Wunderbar Studios, while Divo is the digital partner. Before the album was launched on 12 December 2014 at the Radio Mirchi FM station, the official track list was unveiled a few days earlier. Post the album's release, on 23 January 2015, an instrumental track titled "The Mathimaran Instinct" was released through Anirudh's YouTube channel. Reviewing the album, Karthik of Milliblog stated "Anirudh's music is now getting into a signature style – that's not entirely comforting".

Track listing
No.	Title	Lyrics	Singer(s)	Length
1.	"Kaaki Sattai" (Title Track)	Na. Muthukumar	Vishal Dadlani	3:43
2.	"Kadhal Kan Kattudhe"	Yugabharathi	Anirudh Ravichander, Shakthisree Gopalan	4:16
3.	"The Trooper" (Theme)	—	Instrumental	0:55
4.	"I'm So Cool"	Arunraja Kamaraj	Anirudh Ravichander, Sivakarthikeyan	3:49
5.	"Kaaki Sattai" (Theme)	—	—	0:47
6.	"Kattikida"	Anthony Daasan	Anthony Daasan, M. M. Manasi, Durga, Anitha Karthikeyan	4:27
7.	"Shake That"	Arunraja Kamaraj, Brodha V	Anirudh Ravichander, Brodha V	3:03
8.	"The Mathimaran Instinct" (Theme)	—	—	1:24
Total length:				23:25

== Release ==
Kaaki Sattai was released in theatres on 27 February 2015. It was distributed by Escape Artists Motion Pictures.

== Reception ==
=== Box office ===
In its first four days, the film grossed ₹156 million (US$1.6 million) in Tamil Nadu, described by IANS as the "biggest opening" for a Sivakarthikeyan film to that point.

=== Critical reception ===
Sify wrote, "On the whole, Kakki Sattai is a crowd-pleaser that knows exactly who its audience is". Anupama Subramanian of Deccan Chronicle rated it 2.5/5 and wrote that director "Durai Senthilkumar and actor Sivakarthikeyan have done an estimable job in making the film at least worth experiencing". Baradwaj Rangan wrote for The Hindu, "As overlong, utterly generic, badly written, indifferently made action-comedy star vehicles propelled by Anirudh's growling guitar riffs go, Kaaki Sattai is as disposable as they come". M Suganth of The Times of India wrote, "It is a serious subject but given that Sivakarthikeyan is the hero here, the treatment is lighter in Kaaki Sattai. And that is the problem with the film. The film keeps alternating between the serious and the light tones". Gautaman Bhaskaran of Hindustan Times rated the film 1 out of 5 and wrote, "Kakki Sattai seems like a work where money has been spent in a mindless pursuit" and felt Sivakarthikeyan was miscast.
