= Ninja (singer) =

Indian Punjabi singer and actor

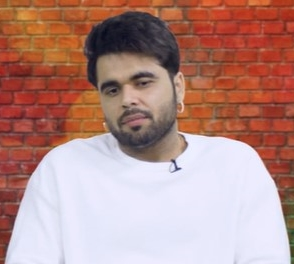
- Ninja in 2019

Background information
- Born: Amit Bhalla; 6 March 1991 (age 34); Ludhiana, Punjab, India
- Genres: Hip hop; Bhangra
- Occupations: Singer; actor
- Instruments: Vocals; algoze; tumbi; harmonium; dhol
- Years active: 2014–present
- Formerly of: Mafia Mundeer
- Spouse: Jasmeet Kaur (m. 2019)
- Past members: Yo Yo Honey Singh; Badshah; Ikka; Raftaar; Lil Golu; J Star; Money Aujla; Leo Grewal; Alfaaz

Amit Bhalla professionally known as Ninja (formerly Ninja Jatt) is an Indian playback singer and actor associated with Punjabi music and cinema. He is Best known for his songs like Aadat, Oh Kyu Ni Jan Sake, Roii Na, Thokda Reha and Gall Jattan Wali. He made his acting debut with the movie Channa Mereya for which he received Filmfare Best Debut Male Award.

== Early life ==
Ninja hailing from Ludhiana, Punjab. In an interview, Ninja stated that he faced many difficulties during his struggling period. In his college days, Ninja held a part-time job in the telecom industry.

Ninja was also a member of Mafia Mundeer, a platform pioneered by Yo Yo Honey Singh. He recalls in interviews, that during his first meet for a recording session, Singh gave him the name "Ninja Jatt" after hearing his vocals. He later shortened it to "Ninja" which he still uses as his stage name.

== Discography ==
Title	Year	Music	Lyricist	Label	Notes
Annd Mand Ka Tola	2014	Akash Kashyap	Kuwar Virk	CM Music	
Pinda Wale Jatt	2014	JSL	Sulakahn Cheema	Karma Entertainment	
Teri Bhabhi Hai	2014	JSL	Ikka	INX Media	
Thokda Reha	2015	Goldboy	Sulakhan Cheema	Malwa Records	
Aadat	2015	Goldboy	Nirmaan	Malwa Records	
Gall Jattan Wali	2015	Goldboy	Pardeep Malak	Malwa Records	
Dil	2016	Goldboy	Nirmaan	Mad 4 Music	
Naam Tera	2016	Goldboy	Aman Grewal	Mad 4 Music	
Desi Da Recard	2016	The Boss	Pardeep Malak	Malwa Records	
Flying Cars	2016	Sultaan	Sultaan	Speed Records	
Oh Kyu Jan Ske	2016	Goldboy	Yadi Dhillon	White Hill Music	
License	2016	Goldboy	Shubhdeep Sidhu	Speed Records	
Viah	2016	Goldboy	Dharambir Bahngu	Shemaaro Punjabi	
Jattan Da Putt Marha Hogya	2017	Mr. V Grooves	Jassi Lohka	White Hill Music	
Athra Subhah	2017	Goldboy	Bablu Sodhi	Speed Records	
Maqabla	2017	Sonu Ramgariya	Pardeep Malak	White Hill Music	From Movie "Channa Mereya"
Jinne Saah	2017	Jaidev Kumar	Happy Raikoti	White Hill Music	From Movie "Channa Mereya"
Door	2017	Goldboy	Yadi Dhillon	White Hill Music	From Movie "Channa Mereya"
Tutda Hi Jaave	2017	Goldboy	Kumaar	White Hilk Music	From Movie "Channa Mereya"
Hawwa De Warke	2017	Goldboy	Navi Kamboj	White Hill Music	From Movie "Channa Mereya"
Roi Na	2017	Goldboy	Nirmaan	T-Series	
Aj Wi Chauni Aa	2018	Goldboy	Rangrez Sidhu	Speed Records	
Challenges	2018	Byg Byrd	Sidhu Moosewala	White Hill Music	
Battle	2018	Gagzstudiz	Simar Doraha	Speed Records	
Hommies	2019	Western Penduz	Jerry	T- Series	
Tres Amor	2019	Preet Hundal	Nirmaan	T-Series	
Kalla Changa	2019	B Praak	Jaani	White Hill Music	
Mitraan Da Naa	2020	Desi Crew	Pardeep Malak	White Hill Music	
Chor	2020	Goldboy	Nirmaan	Gringo Entertainment	Featuring Yuvika Chaudhary
Loaded	2020	Preet Hundal	Pardeep Malak	Gringo Entertainment	Duet with Gurlez Akhtar
Dokha	2020	Goldboy	Pardeep Malak	Gringo Entertainment	
Satan Lage Ho	2021	Gaurav And Kartk Dev	Karma	Khaki Entertainment	Featuring Ruhi Singh
Jatt Nikle	2021	Sembhy K	Pardeep Malak	White Hill Music	With Shipra Goyal
Be Ready	2021	Desi Crew	Happy Raikoti	Happy Raikoti	
Befikra	2021	Yeah Proof	Laddi Chahal	Khaki Entertainment	
Tere Naalon	2021	Goldboy	Yadi Dhillon	White Hill Music	Featuring Payal Rajput
Aadat Ve	2021	Gaurav & Kartik Dev	Vivi	Gringo Entertainment	Featuring Aditi Sharma
Sohneya Ve	2021	Yeah Proof	Laddi Chahal	Nischay Records	
Na Puch Ke	2021	Laddi Gill	Laddi Chahal	Khaki Entertainment	
Ishq Story	2021	Enzo	Navi Ferozpurwala	Times Music	Duet with Deedar Kaur
Jinna Royi Aan	2022	Goldboy	Navi Ferozpurwala	Tips Punjabi	Featuring Mahira Sharma & Paras Chhabra
Heer	2025	Aden	Raja	Ninja Official	
HAMMER	2025	Bull Music	Fateh Shergill	Ninja	

=== Film Songs ===
- "Wafa" - Jind Mahi (2022)
- "Burrah Burrah" - Love in Vietnam (2025)

== Filmography ==
Year	Film	Role	Notes	Refs.	Language
2017	Channa Mereya	Jagat	Lead Role With Payal Rajput		Punjabi
2019	High End Yaariyan	Sachin	Lead Role With Jassie Gill and Ranjit Bawa		Punjabi
2019	Ardab Mutiyaran	Vicky Ahuja	Lead Role With Sonam Bajwa		Punjabi
2019	Doorbeen	Shinda	Lead Role With Jass Bajwa and Wamiqa Gabbi		Punjabi
2019	Zindgi Zindabad	Mintu	Lead Role		Punjabi

=== Upcoming ===
Good Luck Jatta And Casting with Shailesh Pundhir

== Awards ==
Year	Song/Movie	Award	Category	Result	Ref.
2017	Oh Kyu Ni Jan Sake	PTC Punjabi Music Awards	Best New Age Vocalist	Won	
2018	Hawa De Warke	PTC Punjabi Film Awards	Best Playback Singer	Won	
2018	Channa Mereya	Filmfare Awards	Best Debut Male Award	Won	
