= Payal Rajput =

Indian actress (born 1990)

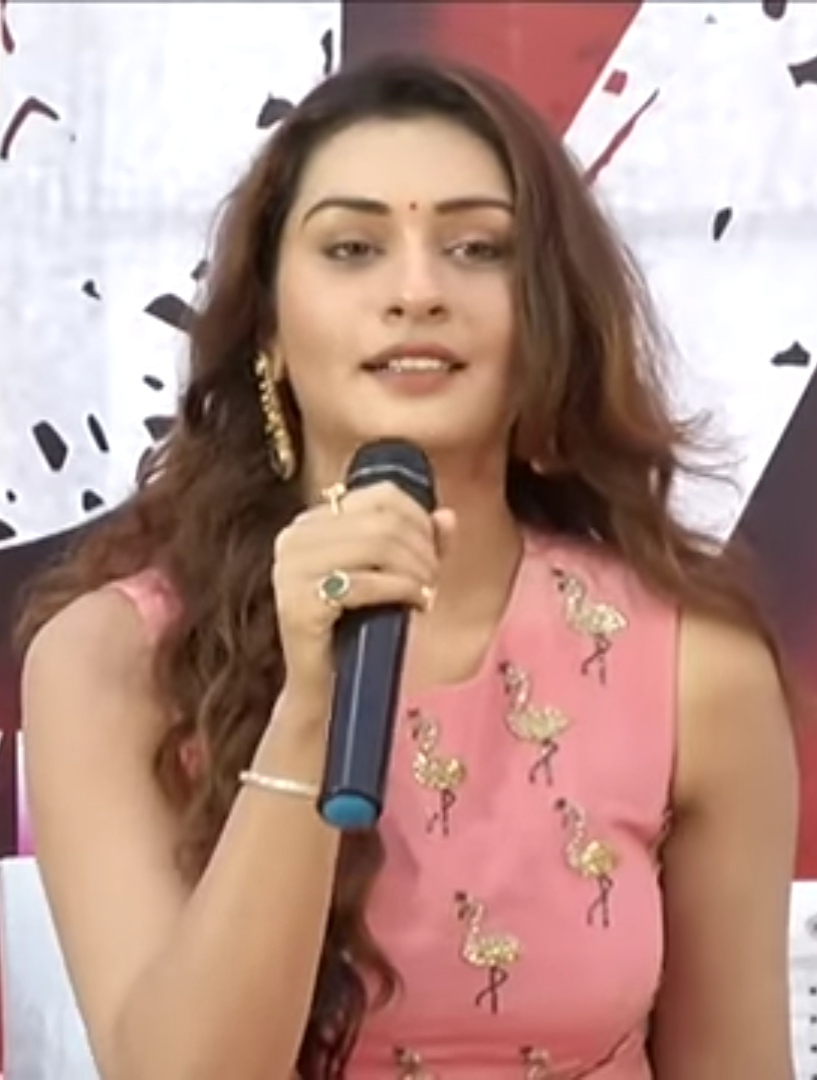
- Rajput in 2019
- Born: 5 December 1992 (age 33); Delhi, India
- Occupation: Actress
- Years active: 2010–present

Payal Rajput (born 5 December 1992) is an Indian actress who primarily works in Telugu and Punjabi films. She made her film debut with the Punjabi film Channa Mereya (2017), for which she won the Filmfare Award Punjabi for Best Debut Actress. Rajput then made her Hindi film debut with Veerey Ki Wedding (2018).

Rajput started her acting career with the Hindi television series Sapnon Se Bhare Naina (2010). She then appeared in shows including Aakhir Bahu Bhi Toh Beti Hee Hai and Maha Kumbh: Ek Rahasaya, Ek Kahani. She made her Telugu film debut with RX 100 (2018), for which she received SIIMA Award for Best Female Debut – Telugu. Her other notable films include, Venky Mama (2019), Shava Ni Girdhari Lal (2021), Head Bush (2022) and Mangalavaaram (2023).

== Early life and career ==
Rajput started her television career in Sapnon Se Bhare Naina as Sonakshi. She played the lead role of Siya in Aakhir Bahu Bhi Toh Beti Hee Hai, in Gustakh Dil as Ishaani and in Maha Kumbh: Ek Rahasaya, Ek Kahani as Maya.

She made her feature film debut in Punjabi with Channa Mereya. The film is a remake of the Marathi film Sairat, and was released on 14 July 2017. She made her Telugu film debut with 2018 film RX 100 and reunited with director Ajay Bhupathi after five years in the venture Mangalavaaram.

Her proper debut in the Tamil language was in Iruvar Ullam (2021), despite a direct to OTT release. Payal made her comeback onscreen after a couple of years with R. S. Durai Senthilkumar’s Leader (2026), headlined by business magnate-turned-actor Legend Saravanan.Although the role had limited screen time, Payal made a significant impact in Leader.

== Filmography ==
=== Films ===
Key
†	Denotes films that have not yet been released

Year	Title	Role	Language	Notes	Ref.
2017	Channa Mereya	Kainaat Dhillon	Punjabi		
2018	Veerey Ki Wedding	Rinki Vohra	Hindi		
2018	RX 100	Indu	Telugu		
2018	Mr & Mrs 420 Returns	Dr. Seerat	Punjabi		
2018	Marriage Palace	Maani	Punjabi		
2019	NTR: Kathanayakudu	Jaya Sudha	Telugu	Cameo appearance	
2019	Ishqaa	Seerat	Punjabi		
2019	Sita	Herself	Telugu	Special appearance in song "BullReddy"	
2019	RDX Love	Alivelu	Telugu		
2019	Venky Mama	Vennela	Telugu		
2020	Disco Raja	Helen	Telugu		
2020	Anaganaga O Athidhi	Mallika	Telugu		
2021	Iruvar Ullam	Parvathy	Tamil	Delayed release; Filmed in 2012–13	
2021	Shava Ni Girdhari Lal	Kammo	Punjabi		
2022	Tees Maar Khan	Anaga	Telugu		
2022	Head Bush	Reshma	Kannada		
2022	Ginna	Swathi	Telugu		
2023	Maya Petika	Payal	Telugu		
2023	Mangalavaaram	Sailaja "Sailu"	Telugu		
2024	Rakshana	Kiran	Telugu		
2026	Leader	Meera	Tamil		
2026	The Great Punjab Robbery	Nimrat	Punjabi		
TBA	Golmaal†	TBA		Completed	
TBA	Kirathaka†	TBA	Telugu	Filming	

=== Television ===
Year	Title	Role	Network	Language	Notes	Ref.
2010–2012	Sapnon Se Bhare Naina	Sonakshi	StarPlus	Hindi		
2013–2014	Gustakh Dil	Ishaani	Life OK	Hindi		
2013–2014	Aakhir Bahu Bhi Toh Beti Hee Hai	Siya	Sahara One	Hindi		
2013–2016	Yeh Hai Aashiqui	Jayashree	Bindass	Hindi	Season 1	
2013–2016	Yeh Hai Aashiqui	Fiza	Bindass	Hindi		
2014–2015	Maha Kumbh: Ek Rahasaya, Ek Kahani	Maya	Life OK	Hindi		
2014–2017	Pyaar Tune Kya Kiya	Reva Raichand	Zing	Hindi		
2016	Darr Sabko Lagta Hai	Payal	&TV	Hindi	Episode 21	
2018	Kaun Hai?	Anamika	Colors TV	Hindi	Episode 7	
2018	No. 1 Yaari with Rana	Guest	Gemini TV	Telugu	Season 2, Episode 3	
2019	Konchem Touch Lo Unte Chepta	Guest	Zee Telugu	Telugu	Season 4, Episode 7	
2020	Bigg Boss 4	Guest	Star Maa	Telugu	Episode 50	
2021	3 Roses	Jhanavi	Aha	Telugu	Web series, Season 1	

=== Music videos ===
Year	Title	Singer	Ref.
2021	"Tere Naalon"	Ninja	
2022	"Baadal Barse"	Yasser Desai	

== Awards and nominations ==
Year	Award	Category	Work	Result	Ref.
2018	2nd Filmfare Awards Punjabi	Best Debut Actress	Channa Mereya	Won	
2018	PTC Punjabi Film Awards	Best Debut Actress	Channa Mereya	Nominated	
2019	8th South Indian International Movie Awards	Best Female Debut – Telugu	RX 100	Won	
2019	2nd City Cine Awards Telugu	Best Female Debut	RX 100	Won	
2021	20th Santosham Film Awards	Most Promising Actress	—N/a	Won	
2024	12th South Indian International Movie Awards	Best Actress – Telugu	Mangalavaaram	Nominated	
