= Leader (2026 film) =

2026 Indian film by R. S. Durai Senthilkumar

- Theatrical release poster
- Directed by: R. S. Durai Senthilkumar
- Screenplay by: R. S. Durai Senthilkumar
- Dialogues by: R. S. Durai Senthilkumar; Arun Chandran
- Story by: R. S. Durai Senthilkumar; G. V. Kumar
- Produced by: Legend Saravanan
- Starring: Legend Saravanan; Shaam; Andrea Jeremiah; Santhosh Prathap; Payal Rajput; Iyal
- Cinematography: S. Venkatesh
- Edited by: Pradeep E. Ragav
- Music by: Ghibran Vaibodha
- Production company: Legend Saravana Stores Productions
- Release date: 3 April 2026
- Running time: 136 minutes
- Country: India
- Language: Tamil
- Box office: ₹6.5 crore

Leader is a 2026 Indian Tamil-language spy action thriller film written and directed by R. S. Durai Senthilkumar and produced by Legend Saravanan. The film stars Saravanan in the lead role alongside Shaam, Andrea Jeremiah, Santhosh Prathap, Payal Rajput, and Iyal in supporting roles. It is the sophomore for Saravanan, both as an actor and producer.

The film was officially announced in June 2024. Principal photography took place between June 2024 and September 2025, in locations including Thoothukudi, Jaipur, Ooty, Georgia and Chennai. The film's title was not revealed until five months after production ended. The music was composed by Ghibran Vaibodha, cinematography was handled by Venkatesh S and editing by Pradeep E. Ragav.

Leader was released in theatres on 3 April 2026, coinciding with Good Friday. The film opened to positive reviews from critics deeming it an improvement over his debut film The Legend (2022). Despite this, it was not a box office success.

== Plot ==
Sakthivel is a widower living with his daughter Irene in Thoothukudi, working as a car mechanic under his landlord Thangapazham. His employer’s biggest client is Salt Raju, a powerful smuggler controlling illegal operations at the harbour under international don Yuvaraj.

Indhra, an honest police officer, is investigating these illegal activities but lacks support due to corruption within the department. After an undercover agent she planted is killed, she approaches Sakthivel for help in wiring a car for surveillance, but he refuses.

Soon after, Sakthivel receives a threatening call claiming his daughter has been kidnapped and placed inside a container at the harbour. He storms the location, only to discover the container holds ammonium nitrate, not his daughter. Indhra reveals this was a ploy to expose the smuggling network and that Irene is safe.

As pressure mounts, Indhra’s superior Bakthavachalam takes control of the case and hides the key evidence. Meanwhile, Salt Raju retaliates against Sakthivel by targeting those close to him and coercing him to retrieve the seized container. Sakthivel complies but secretly plants a bomb inside it. A corrupt official falsely clears the contents as fertilizer, allowing Salt to reclaim it—only for the container to explode, killing Salt & destroying the illegal materials.

Following the incident, Bakthavachalam is suspended due to media pressure. Indhra then discovers that Sakthivel is actually Ponmaran, a former covert operative, who has been orchestrating these events with the help of her father Sathyamoorthy. Under threat from Bakthavachalam, Sathyamoorthy reveals Ponmaran’s past.

Ponmaran was once the leader of a 12-member Indian covert ops team. During an operation, he partnered with Meera, and the two fell in love and had a daughter, Irene. While tracking a rogue intelligence officer, their team became the target of a mysterious assassin known as “Devil,” who began eliminating members one by one. Unable to identify the killer, Ponmaran disbanded the team.

Later, the team was unofficially reassembled by Sathyamoorthy to rescue Indian students held hostage in a foreign nation. During the mission, suspicion fell on Meera being the "Devil" due to her recent inclusion in the team. In reality, the “Devil” was Yuvaraj, who was the twin brother of their contact Robert, seeking revenge for his father’s death from an earlier operation by the team. He kills Robert who tried to stop him and manipulates events to frame Meera, forcing Ponmaran—under orders—to shoot her, while the remaining team members were killed by the Devil.

Ponmaran was imprisoned for six years for his actions in helping the students escape. Upon release, he discovered Irene had grown up in an orphanage and believed him responsible for her mother’s death. Choosing not to reveal the truth, he assumed the identity of Sakthivel. With Sathyamoorthy’s help, he began dismantling Salt Raju’s network, which had been threatening the orphanage.

In the present, Yuvaraj arrives in India to eliminate Ponmaran. However, Ponmaran collaborates with Bakthavachalam and Indhra to expose the entire criminal network. The harbour is cleared of explosives, and Yuvaraj is eventually captured.

While trying to escape by train, Ponmaran is shocked to see Yuvaraj, who reveals a final twist—that they are triplets, and the third brother is Martin. Yuvaraj is shot dead by Indhra as he tries to escape, avenging her boyfriend Roberts death. A final confrontation ensues between Martin and Ponmaran in the train, where Ponmaran defeats him. Before Martin dies, Ponmaran reveals that Meera has survived the gunshots due to dextrocardia and is still alive.

In the end, Ponmaran reunites with both Meera and his daughter Irene, bringing closure to his long ordeal, with the ending possibly hinting a sequel.

== Cast ==
- Legend Saravanan as Sakthivel (Ponmaran)
- Shaam as DCP Bakthavachalam
- Andrea Jeremiah as Inspector Indhra Sathyamoorthy
- Santhosh Prathap in a Triple role as
  - Martin
  - Yuvaraj (the Devil)
  - Robert, Indhra's Boyfriend
- Payal Rajput as Meera, Sakthivel (Ponmaran)'s wife
- Lal as Sathyamoorthy
- Prabhakar as Salt Raju
- Amritha Aiyer as Renuka
- VTV Ganesh as Thangapazham
- Iyal as Irene, Sakthivel (Ponmaran) and Meera's daughter
- Aishwariyaa Bhaskaran as Meera's mother
- George Maryan as Father
- Aranthangi Nisha as Devi
- Adithya Kathir as Sakthivel's co-worker
- Jeyasmirtha
- Phathmen as Ranjith
- Samridha Sam
- Yogi Ram
- O. A. K. Sundar as Bakthavachalam's uncle
- Mahanadi Shankar
- Meesai Rajendran
- Vel Arunachalam
- Niranjan Moses
- Shoban Babu
- Ashok Pandian

== Production ==
The film was officially announced in June 2024, marking the second film produced by Legend Saravanan under his home banner after The Legend (2022). R. S. Durai Senthilkumar was brought on board to direct the film. The film stars Legend Saravanan in the lead role, marking his second major appearance in Tamil cinema after The Legend. Principal photography began in June 2024, with major portions held in Thoothukudi, Jaipur, Ooty, Georgia and Chennai, and wrapped by September 2025. The title Leader was revealed alongside a first-look glimpse in February 2026.

== Music ==
The music and background score is composed by Ghibran Vaibodha, in his maiden collaboration with Saravanan and Durai Senthilkumar. The audio rights were acquired by Think Music. The teaser theme of the film "Leader Teaser Theme" was released on 6 March 2026. The pre-release audio launch event was held on 29 March 2026 at Chennai Trade Centre. The entire soundtrack album was released on 30 March 2026. The song "Muththaitharu", released as a single years before the film was shot, appears onscreen.

Track listing
| No. | Title | Lyrics | Singer(s) | Length |
|---|---|---|---|---|
| 1. | "Leader Glimpse Theme" | – | Ghibran Vaibodha | 1:25 |
| 2. | "Leader Teaser Theme" | – | Ghibran Vaibodha | 1:06 |
| 3. | "Nenjam" | Viveka | Shweta Mohan; Kapil Kapilan | 4:28 |
| 4. | "Ambuli Rock" | Mohan Rajan | Guru Hariraj; Benny Dayal; Keeravani; Kanaka Lakshmi | 3:02 |
| 5. | "Seerum Puli" | Viveka | Narayanan Ravishankar; Vikram Pitty; Shridhar Ramesh | 3:12 |
| 6. | "Aaraaro" | Kabilan | Deepthi Suresh; Adithya RK | 3:14 |
| 7. | "Theera Theera" | Kabilan | Chinmayi Sripada; Haricharan | 3:31 |
| 8. | "Varam Tharum" | Kabilan | V. Sritharan; Mike Theodore | 3:23 |
| 9. | "Leader Stroke" (Instrumental) | – | Ghibran Vaibodha | 2:23 |
| 10. | "Muththaitharu" | Arunagirinathar (Thiruppugazh) | Ghibran Vaibodha | 3:22 |

== Release ==
Leader was theatrically released on 3 April 2026, coinciding with Good Friday. The film was initially planned for release on 9 April 2026, but got advanced by a week after Love Insurance Kompany, which was also scheduled for 3 April, was postponed. The film began streaming on Amazon Prime Video from 29 May 2026.

== Reception ==
Bhuvanesh Chandar of The Hindu wrote, "In his second outing, Saravanan has thankfully discovered the easier route to becoming a mainstream hero: he doesn't try to 'act.' Of course, there's a melodramatic moment that briefly exposes him; however, he has largely submitted to a director who shows maturity". Vishal Menon of The Hollywood Reporter India wrote, "Despite its enjoyable silliness, the film starring Legend Saravanan is so stern that it doesn’t even try to get us on its side". Avinash Ramachandran of Cinema Express wrote, "Despite the random and unnecessary detours, Leader gets its basics right, and never gives you time to put on your logic-tinted glasses".
