= Vijay Award for Best Crew =

Indian film award

The Vijay Award for Best Crew is given by Star Vijay as part of its annual Vijay Awards ceremony for excellence in Tamil (Kollywood) films.

== The list ==
Here is a list of the award winners and the films for which they won.

Year	Director	Team	Link
2014	H. Vinoth	Sathuranga Vettai	
2013	R. S. Durai Senthilkumar	Ethir Neechal	
2012	Karthik Subbaraj	Pizza	
2011	Vetrimaaran	Aadukalam	
2010	Prabu Solomon	Mynaa	
2009	Pandiraj	Pasanga	
2008	M. Sasikumar	Subramaniyapuram	
2007	Venkat Prabhu	Chennai 600028	

== See also ==
- Tamil cinema
- Cinema of India
