= R. S. Durai Senthilkumar =

Indian film director and screenwriter

- Born: 2 July 1981 (age 45); Tamil Nadu, India
- Occupations: director, screenwriter, lyricist
- Years active: 2007–present

R. S. Durai Senthilkumar is an Indian film director, screenwriter, and lyricist working in the Tamil cinema.

== Career ==
Senthilkumar worked as an assistant director to Vetrimaaran, before making his directorial debut with Ethir Neechal (2013), starring Sivakarthikeyan, Priya Anand, and Nandita. The film, with music composed by Anirudh Ravichander, was released on 1 May 2013 to critical acclaim from critics, for which Senthilkumar was awarded the Vijay Award for Best Crew in 2014. His next venture was Kaaki Sattai (2015), again starring Sivakarthikeyan and featuring music composed by Anirudh, alongside Sri Divya, Vijay Raaz and Prabhu. Senthilkumar's next project was the 2016 film Kodi, starring Dhanush, Trisha and Anupama Parameswaran. The film was Dhanush's first time doing dual roles in his career. The film was released on 28 October 2016 to a mixed-to-positive reception from critics.

His next venture was the Dhanush-starrer Pattas (2020). Then, he directed the action drama film, Garudan (2024). He next direction was the action thriller film, Leader (2026) starring Legend Saravanan in lead role. Durai Senthilkumar, who seems to have a knack for reinventing his leads, does it for Saravanan, too.

== Filmography ==
=== As director and screenwriter ===
Year	Title	Notes
2013	Ethir Neechal	Also lyricist for 2 songs: "Un Paarvayil" and "Local Boys"; Vijay Award for Best Crew
2015	Kaaki Sattai	
2016	Kodi	
2020	Pattas	
2024	Garudan	
2026	Leader	

=== Other crew positions ===
Year	Title	Role	Notes
2007	Polladhavan	Actor	Uncredited role
2023	Viduthalai Part 1	Second unit director, co-writer	Assistant director for train sequence only
2024	Viduthalai Part 2	Second unit director, co-writer	
