= Aakhir Bahu Bhi Toh Beti Hee Hai =

2013 Indian television series

- Genre: Drama
- Developed by: Vandana Tiwari
- Written by: Anand Vardhan; Yogesh Vikrant
- Directed by: Prabhat Prabhakar
- Creative directors: Huma Parveen; Vinod Kumar
- Starring: See below
- Theme music composer: Lalit Sen; Chandra Shekhar Varma
- Country of origin: India
- Original language: Hindi
- No. of seasons: 1
- No. of episodes: 135

Production
- Executive producers: Pradeep Mishra; Pooja Ballutia
- Producer: Impact Tele Network
- Cinematography: Shankar Santosh
- Editor: Rochak Ahuja
- Camera setup: Multi-camera
- Running time: 24 minutes

Original release
- Release: 30 September 2013 – 4 April 2014

Aakhir Bahu Bhi Toh Beti Hee Hai (transl. A daughter-in-law is after all a daughter) is an Indian television drama series which premiered on 30 September 2013 on Sahara One. Produced by Pradeep Mishra, the series stars Payal Rajput and Prachee Pathak.

== Overview ==
The story focuses on the evolving relationship between a daughter-in-law, Siya (played by Payal Rajput) and mother-in-law, Naulakha Devi.

== Cast ==
- Payal Rajput as Siya
- Aryan Pandit as Samar
- Prachee Pathak as Naulakha Devi
- Sangam Rai as Prabhat
