= The Legend (2022 film) =

2022 Indian film by J. D.–Jerry

- Theatrical release poster
- Directed by: J. D.–Jerry
- Written by: J. D.–Jerry; Pattukottai Prabhakar (Dialogues)
- Produced by: Legend Saravanan
- Starring: Legend Saravanan; Urvashi Rautela; Geethika Tiwary
- Cinematography: Velraj
- Edited by: Ruben
- Music by: Harris Jayaraj
- Production company: Legend Saravana Stores Productions
- Distributed by: Gopuram Cinemas
- Release date: 28 July 2022
- Running time: 161 minutes
- Country: India
- Language: Tamil

The Legend is a 2022 Indian Tamil-language action film directed by J. D.–Jerry and produced by Legend Saravanan, who makes his debut in the titular role, alongside Urvashi Rautela, Geethika Tiwary (in their Tamil film debut), Prabhu, Vivek, Suman, Yogi Babu and Nassar in the supporting roles. The film follows Saravanan, a scientist who returns to India after studying overseas, who tries to find a cure to diabetes after his friend dies from it.

The film was officially announced in December 2019 under the tentative title Production No. 1, as it is the production house's first venture, and the official title was revealed in March 2022. Principal photography commenced the same month. It was shot in several locations including Chennai, Pollachi and the Himalayas. The film has music composed by Harris Jayaraj, cinematography handled by R. Velraj and editing by Ruben.

The Legend was released worldwide on 28 July 2022 in theatres to negative reviews from critics.

== Plot ==
Dr. Saravanan is a world-famous scientist and a pan-world dancer who returns to India permanently to serve the people in his village and takes up the position of principal in his family's educational institution and also teaches students to dance. Saravanan decides to invent a permanent cure for diabetes after witnessing the death of his childhood friend Tirupathi due to diabetic complications, as well as noticing that Tirupathi's entire family, including his new-born son are diabetics from birth, but later faces obstacles, primarily from the Pharmaceutical industry led by VJ, the chairman of Ojo Pharmaceuticals who aims to sell medicines for the sake of profit.

VJ has a personal grudge on Saravanan as the latter's invention of antibiotic diagnostic test had caused considerable loss for his company, leading to his older brother's (then-chairman) suicide. VJ sends goons led by his henchman Munna to sabotage Saravanan's research, but Saravanan manages to fight them off. Saravanan meets Thulasi who works as a lecturer in his college. After a few incidents, the duo fall for each other and eventually get married. Thulasi seemingly dies in a car explosion orchestrated by Munna with the intention of killing Saravanan. Accompanied by his uncle Thangam, Saravanan leaves for Manali, where Munna is rumoured to be hiding. Saravanan and Thangam manage to catch Munna, but before they can receive information from him, Munna is killed by a mysterious masked person, who later escapes.

Meanwhile, Dr. Madhumitha "Madhu" is also a scientist, who meets Saravanan in Manali and offers to assist him on his research, where Saravanan agrees. Over the next couple of years, the duo and their team, including Saravanan's mentor Dr. Desikan, work extensively on the diabetes cure, named as "Formula J", and soon the cure is ready for human testing. Vasantha Perumal, a rich man who is a diabetic, offers to volunteer for the 15-day human trial. While Perumal initially shows improvement in his diabetes, he soon falls into a coma for which the blame is laid on Formula J. During a hearing, Saravanan manages to convince the scientists as well as VJ that he will do the trial on another person and if it doesn't work Formula J can be banned.

Saravanan tests Formula J on Tirupathi's widow, who has offered to volunteer, where she gets completely cured Saravana investigates the cause of Perumal's coma, where he finds out that his team member Dr. Venu Paapu had sabotaged the human trial in exchange for money from Perumal's brother-in-law, who wants to kill Perumal and take over his business empire. With the help of his elder brother Dr. Pugazhenthi, Saravanan starts working on a cure for Perumal. Tirupathi's widow is completely cured of her diabetes, thus ensuring that Formula J has had a successful human trial. VJ offers a huge amount of money to Saravanan for Formula J, but Saravanan refuses, as he wants it to be free-of-cost so that poor can benefit as well.

VJ and Desikan (who reveals that he is working for VJ), kidnaps Saravanan and take him to VJ's private prison, where several men, women and children are imprisoned as test subjects for illegally testing medicines developed by Ojo by the company's scientist Dr. Gopi. Among the inmates is none other than Thulasi, who is not dead as presumed. Thulasi was not in the car, but was knocked out as she was still close to the car when the explosion happened. Once she was knocked out, Munna imprisoned her in VJ's prison. Saravanan reunites with Thulasi as well as their son Velan who was born in the prison. VJ, Desikan, Gopi, and Madhu asks Saravanan to give his research to Ojo so that they can develop and sell Formula J for huge amounts of money, failing which they will kill Velan.

Madhu turns out to be VJ's niece and the heiress to the Ojo empire who joined with Saravanan to develop Formula J in revenge for her father's death. Madhu is also revealed to be the "mysterious masked person" who had killed Munna earlier in Manali. Saravanan refuses to give his research and fights with them as well as their henchmen, subduing them, as well as releasing all the prison inmates. Madhu tries to kill Saravanan, but she is later killed by the escaping inmates in a stampede. Saravanan, Thulasi and Velan leave the prison and return home. Ojo Pharmaceuticals is shut down for illegally testing medicines on humans, while Formula J is approved by the WHO, making its sale and use legal. Perumal comes out of his coma and is cured. Saravanan is honoured by the Government of India for his success.

Then, VJ is revealed to not be dead in a post-credits scene, where a lead to the second part is cleverly put into place.

== Cast ==
- Legend Saravanan as Dr. Saravanan
- Urvashi Rautela as Dr. Madhumitha "Madhu"
- Geethika Tiwary as Thulasi alias Vaathu, Saravanan’s wife (credited as "Gitika")
- Vivek as Thangam, Saravanan's uncle
- Yogi Babu as Dada
- Prabhu as Dr. Pugazhenthi, Saravanan's elder brother
- Suman as VJ
- Nassar as Dr. Desikan
- Vijayakumar as Saravanan's father
- Latha as Saravanan's mother
- Kumari Sachu as Saravanan's grandmother
- Thambi Ramaiah as Thulasi's father
- Robo Shankar as Thirupati, Saravanan's friend
- Devadarshini as Thirupati's wife
- Mayilsamy as Thangam's sidekick
- Munishkanth as Vasanthan Perumal, a volunteer who helps for diabetes research
- Deepa Shankar as Vasanthan Perumal's wife
- Singampuli as VJ's Assistant
- Livingston as Dr. Gopi
- Mansoor Ali Khan as a politician
- Hareesh Peradi as Dr. Venu Pappu
- Vamsi Krishna as Munna, VJ's henchman
- Besant Ravi as Henchman
- Rahul Dev as a member of VJ's medical mafia
- Amit Tiwari as VJ's henchman
- Cell Murugan as a man from Manali
- Ashwanth Ashokkumar as Thirupathi's son
- Manasvi Kottachi as Thulasi's friend
- Yashika Aannand (special appearance in the song "Mosalo Mosalu")
- Raai Laxmi (special appearance in the song "Vaadi Vaasal")
- Amudhavanan as Thirupathi's brother-in-law
- KPY Yogi as Dr. Pugazhenthi's assistant
- J. D.–Jerry (special appearance in the song "Popopo")

== Production ==
=== Development ===
Legend Saravana Stores Productions company announced a project with J. D.–Jerry as the directors which marks their comeback to directing and with Legend Saravanan in the lead role which would mark his debut as an actor in this film after he previously appeared in ad films of his store with multiple heroines of the film industry present in the ad. It would also marks the first production venture of the businessman-turned actor's production.

Pattukkottai Prabakar was announced to be writing the dialogues and Harris Jayaraj was announced to compose the music which marks his comeback to composing after Kaappaan while R. Velraj and Ruben were announced to be handling cinematography and editing respectively. It was also reported that SS Moorthy was bought in as the art director, while Raju Sundaram, Brindha, and Dinesh have been roped in as choreographers of the film. Initially, it was reported that the film would be a bilingual film made in Tamil and Hindi languages, however these reports proved to be false.

=== Casting ===
Legend Saravanan was reported to play the role of a scientist, while Urvashi Rautela who appeared predominantly in Hindi films, was cast as the female lead, marking her debut in Tamil cinema. She will be seen playing the role of a microbiologist — an IITian in the film. Actress Geethika Tiwari was also announced to play another female lead in this film. Her scenes were shot in Chennai. Suman is also playing a negative role in this film called VJ a filthy medical mafia who is very evil and cruel.

The film also has an ensemble cast of actors including Nassar, Vivek, Vijayakumar, Prabhu, Livingston, Yogi Babu, Robo Shankar, Sachu, Vamsi Krishna, Latha, Deepa Shankar, Hareesh Peradi, Singampuli, Mayilswamy, Besant Ravi and Mansoor Ali Khan in other pivotal roles. Actresses Raai Laxmi and Yashika Aannand were signed on to make special appearances in the songs "Vaadi Vaasal" and "Mosalo Mosalu" respectively.

=== Filming ===
The film has been shot at various locations abroad, apart from Chennai, Pollachi, and the Himalayas. The team shot a song at a set made on a cost of ₹30 crore.

== Music ==
The Legend

Soundtrack album by Harris Jayaraj
- Released: 30 May 2022
- Studio: Studio H
- Genre: Feature film soundtrack
- Length: 19:28
- Language: Tamil
- Label: Think Music India
- Producer: Harris Jayaraj

Harris Jayaraj chronology
Kaappaan (2019)	The Legend (2022)	Extra Ordinary Man (2023)

The music of the film is composed by Harris Jayaraj, making his comeback to composing after Kaappaan, which marks his first collaboration with both Legend Saravanan and J. D.–Jerry, as well as his return to music following a hiatus of almost three years since 2019's Kaappaan. The audio rights of the film were purchased by Think Music India. The first single titled "Mosalu Mosalu" was released on 9 April 2022. The second single titled "Vaadi Vaasal" was released on 20 May 2022. The entire soundtrack album was released on 30 May 2022.

Track listing
No.	Title	Lyrics	Singer(s)	Length
1.	"Mosalo Mosalu"	Pa.Vijay	Armaan Malik, Mukesh Mohamed	4:45
2.	"Vaadi Vaasal"	Snehan	Benny Dayal, Jonita Gandhi	4:19
3.	"Kone Komaane"	Vairamuthu	Javed Ali, Chandana Bala Kalyan	5:35
4.	"Maayakari"	Vairamuthu	Unni Menon, Bombay Jayashri	4:42
5.	"Konji Konji"	Kabilan	Kay Kay, Shreya Ghoshal, Haricharan (Uncredited)	4:45
6.	"Popopo"	Madhan Karky	Kay Kay, Prasad SN, Jonita Gandhi	2:59
7.	"Saravanan Saravedi"	MC Vickey	MC Vickey	1:06
Total length:				29:12

== Marketing ==
The motion poster of the film was unveiled on 3 March 2022 at the film's poster launch held at 2022 Cannes Film Festival.

The theatrical trailer of the film was released on 29 May 2022 in the occasion of the music release of the film. Within 24 hours days, the trailer crosses over 14 million views. Reviewing the trailer of the film Cinema Express wrote "The film directed by the duo JD-Jerry looks like a typical mass entertainer with colourful songs, gravity-defying action, comedy tracks and a mandatory social message in it. From the slick-looking trailer, it is evident that the film boasts of an excellent technical team, rich production values and a stellar ensemble." Indiaglitz too wrote after reviewing the trailer that "The trailer promised a mass entertainer with some gravity-defying action sequences, beautiful locations, colourful songs, comedy tracks and a mandatory social message."

The film's music release took place in Chennai on 29 May 2022. It was also reported that ten more female lead actresses would be a part of the film's audio launch. Another pre-release event was also held in Cochin to promote the film.

== Release ==
=== Theatrical ===
The Legend was released theatrically on 28 July 2022. It was initially slated that the film would be released theatrically on 1 July 2022. However, there were reports suggesting that the film would release on 15 July 2022. However the release date was postponed.

=== Distribution ===
The theatrical rights of the film in Tamil Nadu was brought by Gopuram Cinemas. The distribution rights of the film in Kerala was brought by Magic Frames, while the worldwide distribution rights were acquired by AP International.

=== Home media ===
The satellite rights of the film sold to Star Vijay and the digital rights are acquired by Disney+ Hotstar. The film was premiered on Disney+ Hotstar from 3 March 2023 in Tamil and dubbed versions of Telugu, Malayalam and Hindi languages.

== Reception ==
=== Box office ===
On day 4, of its release the film collected ₹6 crore. The film started streaming in the Disney+ Hotstar on 3 March 2023, where it went on to collect more than ₹65 crores in total revenue with its theatrical and OTT releases combined.

=== Critical response ===
The Legend received negative reviews from critics.

Avinash Ramachandran of Cinema Express gave the film 2 out of 5 stars and wrote "For the uninitiated, the film might be just one big joke, but honestly, Saravanan and team clearly know what they wanted to do with The Legend. They are all in on the joke, and so are we".

M Suganth of The Times of India gave the film 1.5 out of 5 and stated that "The one thing that JD-Jery get right is in glossing their product to hide its two major shortcomings - writing and lead performances. The film is mounted on a scale that reminds us of big-star movies from the 2000s, and even the plastic visual tone (R Velraj is the cinematographer), and grand but empty score (by Harris Jayaraj) are from that time. Alas, if only had they spent some of the money that they have splashed on the needless songs and stunts for the writing! Forget a wannabe star like Saravanan, even a bona fide superstar like Rajinikanth wouldn't have managed to save this vanity project". Bharathy Singaravel of The News Minute rated the film 1.5 out of 5 stars and wrote "Such as putting on display every possible stunt sequence Kollywood has conceived of over the years. To keep pace, Harris Jayraj’s music desperately tries to inflate all the mass moments Saravanan desires. At a run-time of 2 hours 40 minutes, The Legend starts off laughable and quickly becomes unendurably grating. Opinions may differ, but even as a film so awful it could become iconically bad, it fails. It has its utterly charmless hero to thank for that".

Bhuvaneshvar Chander of The Hindu wrote "Sadly, The Legend also fails to consistently be hilarious in its long 160-minute runtime. On top of it all, this is also a film that ridiculously uses Vivekh, even making one feel guilty for disliking the role of the late legendary actor". Kirubhakar Prabhakaran of The Indian Express gave the film 1 out of 5 stars and wrote "The innate problem of The Legend is that it’s not a movie but a set piece to propel Saravanan into stardom. Even the well-intended story about taking on the medical mafia is exploited to serve the hero. All the scenes are carefully crafted to exalt the hero, and it is saddening and excruciating to see these renowned actors reduced to auxiliary templates with only one objective – to hype up the hero. JD and Jerry have made much better ad films, and The Legend ends up as an elaborate and expensive addition to their stable. The pseudo movie aims to sell Saravanan Arul as a star. Unfortunately, the attempt is in vain since stars – both cinematic and celestial – cannot be designed".

Jayadeep Jayesh of Deccan Herald rated the film 1 out of 5 and wrote "Haris Jayaraj’s music does not reflect his best work. Sloppy VFX and over-saturated cinematography are also minuses of the film. A few self-aware jokes would have made ‘The Legend’ a moderately enjoyable spoof of the vintage ‘masala film’. But the film takes itself way too seriously".
