= Tees Maar Khan (2022 film) =

2022 film by Kalyanji Gogana

- Theatrical release poster
- Directed by: Kalyanji Gogana
- Written by: Kalyanji Gogana
- Produced by: Nagam Tirupathi Reddy
- Starring: Aadi Saikumar; Payal Rajput; Sunil; Srikanth Iyengar
- Cinematography: M. N. Balreddy
- Edited by: Manikanth
- Music by: Sai Karthik
- Production company: Vision Cinemaas
- Release date: 19 August 2022
- Running time: 135 minutes
- Country: India
- Language: Telugu

Tees Maar Khan also known by the initialism TMK, is a 2022 Indian Telugu-language action drama film written and directed by Kalyanji Gogana and produced by Nagam Tirupathi Reddy. The film stars Aadi Saikumar, Payal Rajput, Sunil, and Srikanth Iyengar in pivotal roles. The film's music is composed by Sai Karthik. The film's title is based on a lyric from the titular song of Racha (2012).

The film was released theatrically on 19 August 2022 to mixed reviews. The plot follows Tees Maar Khan, who was appointed to fix law and order situation in the city.

== Plot ==
Tees Maar Khan and Vasudha, victims of domestic violence, move out of their homes. Vasudha, being the eldest, takes care of Tees Maar Khan. He names her his Amma (mother). A lonely police constable adopts these two homeless children, and they become one family. Years later, Vasudha marries Chakri. On the other hand, Tees Maar Khan lands in a tussle with Jeeja, a mafia don, causing his family to be targeted and Vasudha to be killed. Frustrated by Amma (Vasudha)'s death, Tees Maar Khan seeks vengeance.

== Cast ==
- Aadi Saikumar as TMK aka Tees Maar Khan
- Payal Rajput as Anaga
- Sunil as Chakri
- Poorna as Vasudha: wife of Chakri
- Srikanth Iyengar as Home Minister Ranga Rajan
- Thakur Anoop Singh as Jija
- Kabir Duhan Singh as Talwar
- RJ Hemanth as TMK's Friend
- Ambati Arjun as Arjun: a college student
- Aziz Naser as SI
- Vanitha Reddy as mother of TMK

== Production ==
After shooting a song in Goa, filming was completed in December 2021, mainly in the Telangana region.

== Soundtrack ==
The film score and soundtrack album of the film is composed by Sai Kartheek. The music rights were acquired by Aditya Music.

No.	Title	Lyrics	Singer(s)	Length
1.	"Papa Agave"	Bhaskarabhatla	N. C. Karunya	3:17
2.	"Samayanike"	Rakendu Mouli	M L Shruti	4:00
3.	"Tees Maar Khan Theme Song"	Rakendu Mouli	M L Shruti, M L Gayatri, Abikhya, Sai Kartheek	3:02
4.	"Egire Egire"

== Release and reception ==
Tees Maar Khan was released on 19 August 2022.

The Times of India gave a rating of 2.5 out of 5 and wrote that "the film impresses with its stellar performances by the cast, good production values, decent cinematography and music, but what doesn't work in its favour are its mediocre screenplay and routine script. However, irrespective of its drawbacks". Praising the performances of Aadi and Sunil, Mural Krishna Ch of Cinema Express wrote: "Tees Maar Khan largely entertains with twists on familiar tropes and impressive performances. The film may serve well for the audience who like watching high-voltage masala entertainers".

== Home media ==
The film premiered on Amazon Prime Video.The Satellite rights acquired by star maa
