= Aryan Pandit =

- Born: Varanasi
- Occupations: Actor; model
- Years active: 2015–present

Aryan Pandit is an Indian actor and model. Pandit's acting career began with the TV series Actor, which aired on Colors TV. His first TV serial was na ana is desh lado. He is also known for Dahleez where he played the role of Abhay Sinha.

== Television ==
Year	Show	Role
2010–2012	Na Aana Is Des Laado	Rajveer Avtaar Sangwan
2013–2014	Aakhir Bahu Bhi Toh Beti Hee Hai	Samar
2014–2015	Box Cricket League	Himself
2016	Dahleez	DCP Abhay Sinha
2016–2017	Naagin 2	Romil Manav Nikanch

== Personal life ==
Aryan Pandit was born and brought up in Varanasi. He was the runner up for the Mr Eastern UP pageant.
