= Channa Mereya (film) =

2017 Film by Pankaj Batra

- Theatrical release poster
- Directed by: Pankaj Batra
- Story by: Nagraj Manjule
- Produced by: Gunbir Singh Sidhu; Manmord Sidhu
- Starring: Ninja; Payal Rajput
- Cinematography: Vineet Malhotra
- Edited by: Manish More
- Music by: Goldboy
- Production company: White Hill Studios
- Distributed by: Zee Studios
- Release date: 14 July 2017
- Running time: 132 minutes
- Country: India
- Language: Punjabi

Channa Mereya (transl. The light of my soul) is a 2017 Indian Punjabi-language romantic drama film directed by Pankaj Batra. It is a remake of the Marathi film Sairat (2016). The film's title is inspired by a song of the same name from Bollywood film Ae Dil Hai Mushkil (2016).

== Synopsis ==
The film follows Kainat (Payal Rajput), a girl from a wealthy family who falls in love with her poor classmate Jagat (Ninja). They start seeing each other secretly, but when their relationship is exposed, they face trouble from Kainat's brother Balli (Amrit Maan) and father (Yograj Singh).

== Cast ==
- Ninja as Jagat
- Payal Rajput as Kainat Dhillon
- Amrit Maan as Balli Dhillon
- Yograj Singh as Kainat's father

== Production ==
Channa Mereya is an official remake of the 2016 Marathi film Sairat. While remaining largely faithful to the original film, director Pankaj Batra took a few liberties: while the male lead of Sairat had a younger sister, the character was replaced with a younger brother in Channa Mereya. The male lead's friend in Marathi was a farmer, while the remake depicts him as a mechanic. Ninja, a playback singer, made his acting debut with this film, as did lyricist and singer Amrit Maan.

== Soundtrack ==
The soundtrack was composed by Goldboy.

Track listing
No.	Title	Singer(s)	Length
1.	"Hawa De Warke"	Ninja	5:24
2.	"Jinne Saah"	Ninja, Jyotica Tangri	3:35
3.	"Door"	Ninja	3:35
4.	"Tutda Hi Jaave"	Ninja	4:50
5.	"Maqabla"	Ninja	3:49
6.	"Lalkara"	Amrit Maan	3:44
Total length:			24:57

== Release and reception ==
Channa Mereya was released on 14 July 2017. The film received mixed reviews from critics, who felt it was a "copy-paste" version of Sairat. Jasmine Singh of Tribune called it a "remake gone wrong", but "things that still make Channa Mereya appreciable are, the fresh pairing of Ninja and Payal Rajput, nice music and praise worthy cinematography". Bobby Sing Mid-Day called Rajput the film's "weakest link", adding, "While the film adeptly highlights the caste and class system prevalent in the society, where it fails is in the presentation of the lead pair."
