= Ginna (film) =

2022 film directed by Eeshaan Suryaah

- Theatrical release poster
- Directed by: Eeshaan Suryaah
- Written by: Kona Venkat
- Story by: G. Nageswara Reddy
- Produced by: Mohan Babu
- Starring: Vishnu Manchu; Payal Rajput; Sunny Leone
- Cinematography: Chota K. Naidu
- Edited by: Chota K. Prasad
- Music by: Anup Rubens
- Production companies: AVA Entertainment; 24 Frames Factory
- Release date: 21 October 2022
- Country: India
- Language: Telugu
- Budget: ₹20–25 crore
- Box office: est. ₹9.05 crore

Ginna is a 2022 Indian Telugu-language horror comedy film directed by Eeshaan Suryaah, and written by G. Nageswara Reddy and Kona Venkat. It was produced by Mohan Babu, AVA Entertainment and 24 Frames Factory. The film stars Vishnu Manchu, Payal Rajput, Sunny Leone, Vennela Kishore, and Raghu Babu. The music was composed by Anup Rubens.

Principal photography began in April 2022 and the title Ginna was announced in June 2022. The movie was initially scheduled for an 5 October release. However, due to post-production delays, it was released on 21 October.

== Cast ==
- Vishnu Manchu as Gali Nageswar Rao "Ginna"
- Payal Rajput as Swathi
- Sunny Leone as Renuka (Fake) / Ruby D'Souza
- Vennela Kishore as Mysore Bujji
- Sunil as NRI groom
- Suresh as Narayana Swamy, Renuka's Father
- Annapurna as Ginna's grandmother
- Naresh as Veera Swamy, Renuka's Uncle
- Raghu Babu as Village President Tippeswar Rao
- Satyam Rajesh as Village volunteer
- Chammak Chandra as Rakesh Master
- Saddam as Satti Pandu
- Bhadram as Godugu
- Divi Vadthya as Renuka (Original)
- Ranjith Velayudhan as Chirala Govardhan
- Balakrishna as Dr. Raghu Varma
- Umesh Kaushik as Prem Shikhar

== Music ==
The soundtracks, score and music of the film is composed by Anup Rubens and choreography of each song by Prabhu Deva, Prem Rakshith, and Ganesh Acharya. Ginna's first song was sung by Vishnu's twin daughters Ariaana and Viviana making their singing debut.

Track listing
No.	Title	Lyrics	Singer(s)	Length
1.	"Idhi Sneham"	Bhaskara Batla	Ariaana Manchu, Viviana Manchu	3:31
2.	"Golisoda"	Balaji	Nakash Aziz, Nutana Mohan	3:33
3.	"Naa Peru Ginna"	Em CK	Prudhvi Chandra	3:53
4.	"Jaru Mitaya"	Ganesh A, Biju Lal, Yukti	Nirmala Rathod, Simha	4:14
5.	"What a Jodi"	Divya Kumar	Varikuppala Yadagiri, Yukti	3:53
Total length:				17:84

== Production and release ==
The film began its production in March 2022 in Hyderabad and Tirupati. The movie was released in Telugu, in addition to dubbed versions in Hindi, Tamil and Malayalam languages simultaneously on 21 October.

== Reception ==
Ronak Kotecha of The Times of India rated the film 3 out of 5 stars and wrote "Ginna is quite a messy/massy affair that doesn't bother about things like logic, great performances and conviction, as long as it can give its audience a good time and a good laugh. And it manages to do that more than once". News18 gave 3 out of 5 stars mentioning Comedy entertainer one time watch. The Hans India rated the film 3 out of 5 stars and wrote "'Ginna' is a complete entertainer and it engaged the audience to have a decent weekend!". Sakshi Post rated the film 2.5 out of 5 stars and wrote "Ginna will surely make you all laugh in some scenes. Overall, a satisfying attempt".

=== Box office ===
Ginna collected $75k in the United States and Canada.
