= Ethir Neechal (2013 film) =

2013 Indian film by R. S. Durai Senthilkumar

- Theatrical release poster
- Directed by: R. S. Durai Senthilkumar
- Written by: R. S. Durai Senthilkumar
- Produced by: Dhanush
- Starring: Sivakarthikeyan; Priya Anand; Nandita Swetha
- Cinematography: R. Velraj
- Edited by: Kishore Te
- Music by: Anirudh Ravichander
- Production company: Wunderbar Films
- Distributed by: Vendhar Movies
- Release date: 1 May 2013
- Running time: 122 minutes
- Country: India
- Language: Tamil

Ethir Neechal (transl. Swimming against the tide) is a 2013 Indian Tamil-language sports comedy drama film written and directed by R. S. Durai Senthilkumar in his directorial debut. The film stars Sivakarthikeyan, Priya Anand and Nandita Swetha. Produced by Dhanush under Wunderbar Films, it follows a man who seeks to change his life by competing in the Chennai Marathon.

Principal photography took place between July 2012 and February 2013. The music was composed by Anirudh Ravichander, with cinematography performed by R. Velraj and editing by Kishore Te. The film was released on 1 May 2013 and became a commercial success.

== Plot ==
In 1985, in rural Thanjavur, a woman named Sivagami has complications while giving birth. Sivagami's husband prays to his native deity that if she delivers his baby successfully, he will name the baby after the deity. The baby is born without any problems, and as per the wish, they name the baby Kunjithapadham. As a boy, Kunjithapadham faces many problems and embarrassments due to his name, as his peers call him "Kunju" or "Kunji" (the private part of the male body). He decides to change his name, but his mother falls severely ill, and he prays to God that he will never change his name. His mother recovers, and they move to Chennai.

Years later, Sivagami dies. Kunjithapadam's friend Peter advises him to change his name to have a change in his life. After meeting an astrologer, Gunasekara Raja, he legally renames himself "Harish." He also changes his residence and job. Luck starts to favour him from that day onwards. He falls in love with Geetha, a schoolteacher, and succeeds in winning her heart. He later gets a job, and life goes smoothly for him. One day, his lottery ticket hits victory, and he must cash it in for a television set as a prize. However, the lottery has registered his earlier name as "Kunjithapadham." He gets the television set using Peter, but Geetha finds out his true name and berates him for lying to her. She tells him that he needs to succeed at something in life to win her heart.

Harish decides to participate in the coming Chennai Marathon. He meets a trainer, J. Prakash, alias JP, who takes him to his former student Valli, who had quit athletics. She agrees to train Harish. Later, he sees her crying on the terrace with a photo of her deceased father. Harish asks her to tell her past. Valli was a naturally talented athlete from her young days. Her father supported her talent and spoke with many men to get her past many tournaments. She got into a state-level tournament where she beat the rookie of a corrupt coach, Raja Singh. Infuriated, Raja Singh accused Valli of failing a gender verification test. The board punished Valli and stopped her from participating. Heartbroken, Valli's father died of a heart attack. JP then met with an accident.

Hearing Valli's story, Harish is moved and decides to win the marathon. Geetha also urges him to win it for the sake of Valli. During the marathon, Harish faces stiff competition from one of Raja Singh's rookies, but eventually wins the race. Harish tells the media about Valli's innocence and his original name Kunjithapadham, wanting to be recognised by people from his native village. Raja Singh is found guilty and arrested, and Valli resumes athletics. Harish later opens and runs a training academy under his original name. A man named Dinakaran, acting on Harish's advice, proposes his love to Valli, and she accepts.

== Cast ==
- Sivakarthikeyan as Kunjithapadham / Harish
- Priya Anand as Geetha
- Nandita Swetha as Valli
- Sathish as Peter
- Suza Kumar as Kunjithapatham's love interest
- Jayaprakash as Coach J. Prakash (JP)
- Ravi Prakash as Raja Singh
- Sharath Lohithaswa as Valli's father (dubbed by M. S. Bhaskar)
- Manobala as Numerologist Gunasekara Raja
- Madhan Bob as Kunjithapatham's manager
- Swaminathan as Paavadaisamy / Google
- Bava Lakshmanan
- Aarthi as lady at cinema
- Surekha Vani as Sivagami, Kunjithapatham's mother
- Gemini Rajeshwari
- Pasanga Sivakumar as Kunjithapatham's father
- Nithya Sree as Geetha's friend
- RJ Balaji as himself (host of Chennai Marathon)
- Dhanush as Soup boy (special appearance)
- Nayanthara as dancer (special appearance in the song "Local Boys")
- Anirudh Ravichander as Bar Waiter (cameo appearance)
- Attakathi Dinesh as Dinakaran (guest appearance)

== Production ==
=== Development ===
Ethir Neechal is the directorial debut of R. S. Durai Senthilkumar, a former assistant of Vetrimaaran. It was produced by Dhanush via Wunderbar Films. Senthilkumar initially wanted him as the lead actor, but Sivakarthikeyan was instead cast. Priya Anand, the lead actress, revealed that Ethir Neechal is a city-based story without cheap comedy, vulgar dialogues or inappropriate scenes. The film's title was derived from the 1968 film of the same name. It was reported that Dhansika was cast as the second heroine; however Nandita Swetha was signed on. Anirudh Ravichander was hired as the music composer, after his debut film 3. The technical crew includes Velraj as the cinematographer, Kishore Te as the editor, G. Durairaj handling the art direction, Anu Parthasarathy as the costume designer and Stunt Silva choreographing the action sequences.

=== Filming ===
Principal photography commenced on 23 July 2012, with the first shot taken by Balu Mahendra. Dhanush and Nayanthara appeared in a special appearance, dancing together in the dappankuthu number "Sathiyama Nee Enakku (Local Boys)", with Nayanthara designing costumes for herself. The song was shot in Nagercoil at a Punjabi dhabha restaurant. Principal photography wrapped on 22 February 2013, with the post-production activities being commenced after the shoot which was completed on 24 April 2013.

== Music ==
The soundtrack features six songs that belonged to varied genres; Vaali, Dhanush and R. S. Durai Senthilkumar penned lyrics for two songs each. For the title track "Ethir Neechal" composer Anirudh hired Punjabi rapper Yo Yo Honey Singh, and Adhi from the duo Hiphop Tamizha, to croon the rap versions of the song. The album's final mixing took place in Mumbai.

It was announced that Sony Music had brought the marketing rights for the film's soundtrack album. The making of the album was launched by the film's crew members, prior to the audio launch.

== Release ==
The distribution rights of Ethir Neechal were secured by Vendhar Movies. The film was initially scheduled to release in April 2013, but later pushed to 1 May. It was given a U (unrestricted) certificate by the censor board with no cuts.

Ethir Neechal was released in 300 screens across Tamil Nadu, clashing with Soodhu Kavvum and Moondru Per Moondru Kadal. Apart from the Tamil Nadu release, the film was simultaneously released in the United States by Gramaphone LLC.

== Reception ==
=== Critical reception ===
M Suganth of The Times of India gave 3 out of 5 stars, stating, "The first half of Ethir Neechal follows the current Tamil cinema formula of 'laughs first, plot next'." Baradwaj Rangan for The Hindu wrote "Sivakarthikeyan looks like he's getting there — he's not yet a star, at least in the leading-man sense,[sic] he gets a feature-length platform to display his comic chops". Malini Mannath of The New Indian Express stated "Ethir Neechal is a mild passable entertainer". IANS stated, "The film starts off like every other romantic-comedy with adequate amount of comedy and drama, but there's hardly anything spectacular to rave about, including the story." S. Saraswathi of Rediff.com gave 3.5 out of 5 stating "Ethir Neechal is a simple city-based romantic comedy that is guaranteed to provide some wholesome family entertainment."

=== Box office ===
The film opened with 80–90% occupancy on the first day and collected ₹4 crore (US$430,000). The film collected ₹17.97 lakh (US$19,000) in UK and ₹10.60 lakh (US$11,000) in United States in first weekend. The film collected ₹5.51 lakh (US$5,900) in United States in first day, ₹9.12 lakh (US$9,700) in three days including Thursday previews, around ₹1.5 lakh (US$1,600) on 5 April and total collection of ₹17.97 lakh (US$19,000). The film's success was celebrated at the Victoria Hall in Geneva, Switzerland.

== See also ==
- List of films about the sport of athletics
