= Chennai Marathon =

Annual marathon held in Chennai, India

The Chennai Marathon is an annual marathon held in Chennai, India. The event is organised by the Chennai Runners, and is one of the few events in the state to be endorsed by the Sports Development Authority of Tamil Nadu (SDAT).

Starting at the Napier Bridge in Marina Beach (for Full Marathon, Twenty Miler & 10k) & Elliot's Beach (for Half Marathon) and terminating at the Indian Maritime University, East Coast Road (for Full Marathon, Twenty Miler & Half Marathon) & at CPT Ground, Tharamani (for 10k). It is considered South India's largest city marathon, in which over 1,000 athletes and more than 20,000 amateurs participate. The event has four categories: full Marathon, Twenty Miler, Half marathon, and the most popular, the 10 km race.

The 2024 edition will be held on Saturday 06 Jan 2024 and an expected 20,000 competitors would be participating. The event is sponsored by Freshworks.

== Results ==
=== Full Marathon: Men ===
Year	Participants	Start point	Finish point	Result		
Year	Participants	Start point	Finish point	First	Second	Third
2016	16,000	Kasturba Nagar MRTS station	CPT-IP ground	(India) Jegadheesan; Time: 2:35:20	(India) Vairavanathan; Time: 2:41:49	(India) Nagesh Pawar; Time: 2:44:11
2017	25000*	Kasturba Nagar MRTS station	CPT-IP ground	Yet to be held Time:	Yet to be held Time:	Yet to be held Time:
2023	20,000+			Vinoth Kumar Srinivasan (02:37:28)	Gyan Babu (02:48:46)	Jegadheesan Munusamy (02:57:39),

=== Full Marathon: Women ===
Year	Participants	Start point	Finish point	Result		
Year	Participants	Start point	Finish point	First	Second	Third
2016	16,000	Kasturba Nagar MRTS station	CPT-IP ground	(India) Shailaja Sridhar; Time: 3:49:36	(India) Helena; Time: 3:54:45	(India) Sneka; Time: 4:20:00
2017	25000**	Kasturba Nagar MRTS station	CPT-IP ground	Yet to be held Time:	Yet to be held Time:	Yet to be held Time:
2023	20,000+			Brigid Jerono Kimitwai (03:31:36)	Sandya Shanker (03:33:57)	Mamta Rawat (03:53:41)

=== Half Marathon: Men ===
Year	Participants	Start point	Finish point	Result		
Year	Participants	Start point	Finish point	First	Second	Third
2016	16,000	Napier Bridge	CPT-IP ground	(India) Soji Mathew; Time: 1:11:26	(India) B.C. Tilak; Time: 1:13:56	(India) Vinod Kumar; Time: 1:14:45
2017	Unknown	Napier Bridge	CPT-IP ground	Yet to be held Time:	Yet to be held Time:	Yet to be held Time:
2023	20,000+			Monu Kumar	Mallikarjuna P	Asokan Shanmugam

=== Half Marathon: Women ===
Year	Participants	Start point	Finish point	Result		
Year	Participants	Start point	Finish point	First	Second	Third
2016	16,000	Napier Bridge	CPT-IP ground	(India) Padmavathy; Time: 1:31:21	(India) Poongodi; Time: 1:40:39	(India) Vasantha Mani; Time: 1:42:11
2017	Unknown	Napier Bridge	CPT-IP ground	Yet to be held Time:	Yet to be held Time:	Yet to be held Time:
2023	20,000+			Vrushali Uttekar	Jagadeeswari J J	Thraranidivya Palanisamy

== Victories by nationality ==
Country	Men's Open	Women's Open	Men's Half Marathon	Women's Half Marathon	Total
India	~3	~3	~3	~3	~12
Kenya	~1	~	~	~	~1
