= Saravana Stores =

Indian textile and jewellery store chain

- Logo of Super Saravana Stores, flagship chain run by founding family

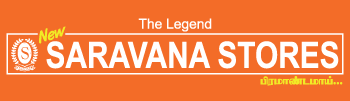
- Logo of Legend Saravana Stores, subsidiary run by Legend Saravanan
- Industry: Retail
- Genre: Textile and jewellery stores
- Founded: 1969
- Founders: S. Yogarathinam Nadar, Son of Shanmuga Sundaram Nadar; Later his brothers S. Selvarathinam Nadar & S. Rajarathinam Nadar joined to expand the business; Legend Saravanan, Son of Yogarathinam Nadar
- Headquarters: Chennai, Tamil Nadu, India
- Number of locations: 15
- Key people: Legend Saravanan (Founder, Legend Saravana Stores); S. Rajarathinam (MD, Super Saravana Stores); Ashwin Therazhandur (CEO of Saravana's Selvarathinam)
- Products: Textiles; Readymades; Silk Sarees; Jewellery; Electronics; Groceries; Stationary; Gadgets; Cutlery; Footwear; Food
- Revenue
- Parent: Saravana Stores Enterprise
- Subsidiaries: Super Saravana Stores; Legend New Saravana Stores; Saravana's Selvarathinam
- Website: Saravana's Selvarathinam: saravanaonline.com// Super Store: supersaravanastores.com Super Store Elite: saravanastores.in The Legend New Saravana Stores: saravanastoreslegend.co.in

Saravana Stores is a chain of retail stores in India, founded in 1969 by S. Yogarathinam Nadar. It is the largest family owned business retail chain in Tamil Nadu. The flagship entity of Saravana Stores (referred as "Super Saravana Stores") is managed by S. Rajarathinam Nadar, while the subsidiary entity "The Legend New Saravana Stores: Brammandamai" is run by Legend Saravanan, son of Yogarathinam Nadar.

== History ==
Saravana Stores was found in 1969 by S. Yogarathinam Nadar along with two of his brothers S. Selvarathinam Nadar and Rajarathinam Nadar, who hailed from Panika Nadar Kudiyiruppu village near Tuticorin, Tamil Nadu. Started as "Shanmugam Stores", a small shop that initially sold vessels, the business expanded, and by 1977, the first "Saravana Stores" complex opened in T. Nagar, Chennai. The annual revenue of the store is estimated at more than Rs 2,500 crore. The entity "Saravana Stores Elite" was launched in 2013, targeting the 'elite' market with focus mainly on jewellery.

== Locations ==
The flagship entity, "Super Saravana Stores", operates four stores in Chennai: on T. Nagar's Ranganathan Street, and in Purasawalkam, Porur and Chromepet. The entity also has mega stores in Madurai and Coimbatore.

The entity "The Legend New Saravana Stores: Brammandamai", run by Legend Saravanan, currently operates three stores in Chennai, one located on T. Nagar's North Usman Road and other two include retail store plus a furniture outlet, located in Padi. The fourth store, set to be the largest, is planned at Radial Road, Pallavaram.

The entity "Saravana Stores Elite", run by Dr. Siva Arul Durai (another son of Yogarathinam Nadar), has branches on T. Nagar's Duraisamy Road and in Tambaram.

The entity "Saravana Selvarathinam" Stores, founded by S. Selvarathinam Nadar, operates stores at T. Nagar and Pallavaram in Chennai, as well as in Tirunelveli and Madurai.

== Revenue ==
In 2023, the company reported an annual turnover of about ₹ 2495 crore (300 million US dollars).

== Foray into 100% milk based ice cream ==
In 2004, Saravana Groups launched a new ice cream brand named Jamaai, a 100% milk based ice-cream brand. The factory is located at Padappai, a suburb of Chennai en route Sriperumbudur and sold across Tamil Nadu. It has a capacity of 10,000-litres per day ice cream production and expected to expand to 30,000 litres per day.

== Fire incident ==
On 2 September 2008, a fire inside the building led to the death of two of its employees and damages worth crores of rupees. Unauthorized construction and ignoring safety measures are believed to be the reason.

Super Saravana Stores: On March 1,2023 around 4.30 p.m. the flames were noticed in the Food Court on 9floor. The staff and the customers from all the floors were evacuated. No one was injured in the accident. Property worth 37 crore has been damaged in the major fire that broke out on Melur Main Road in Madurai city.

== Gallery ==
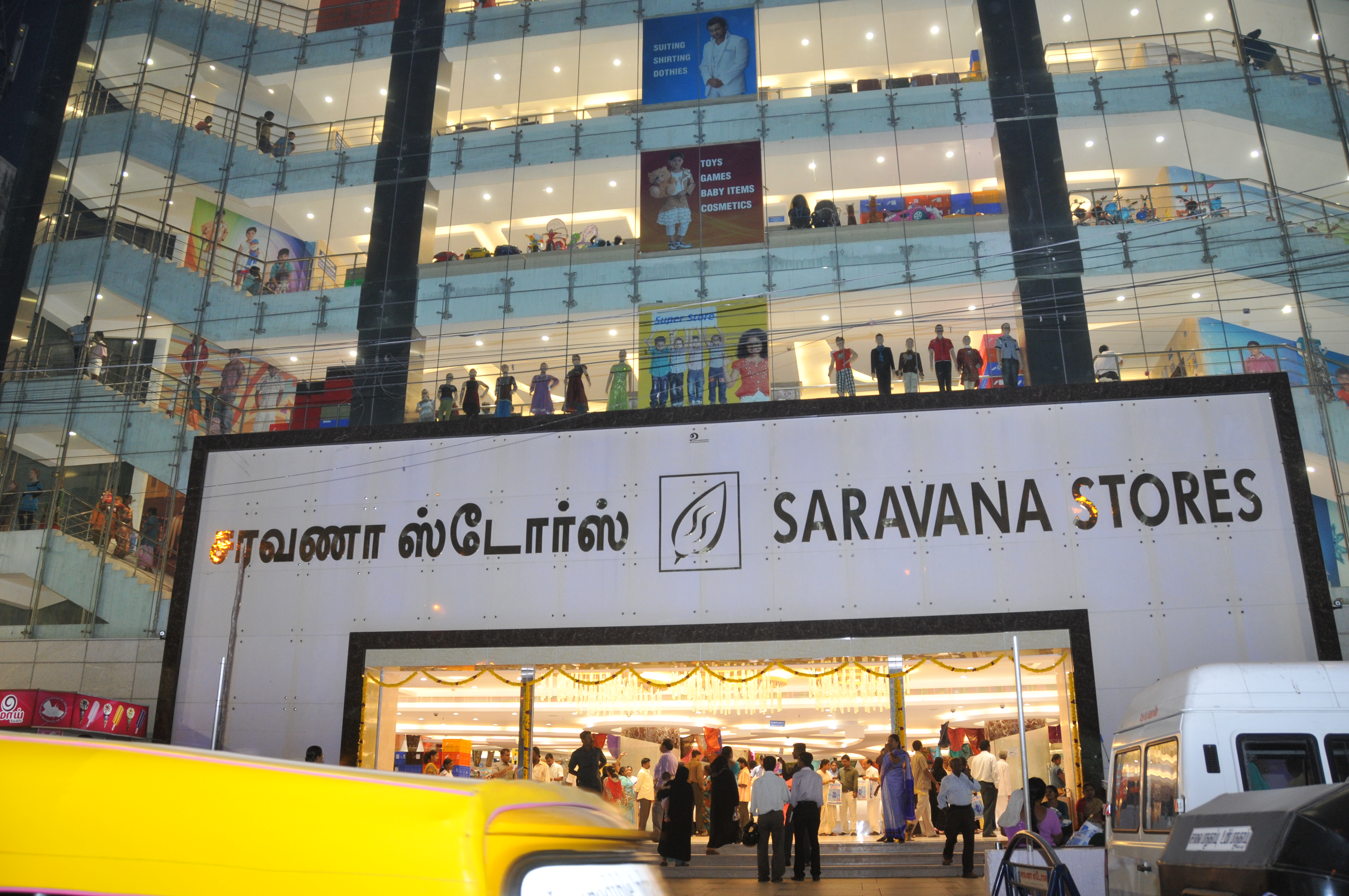
Super Saravana Stores at Purasaivakkam

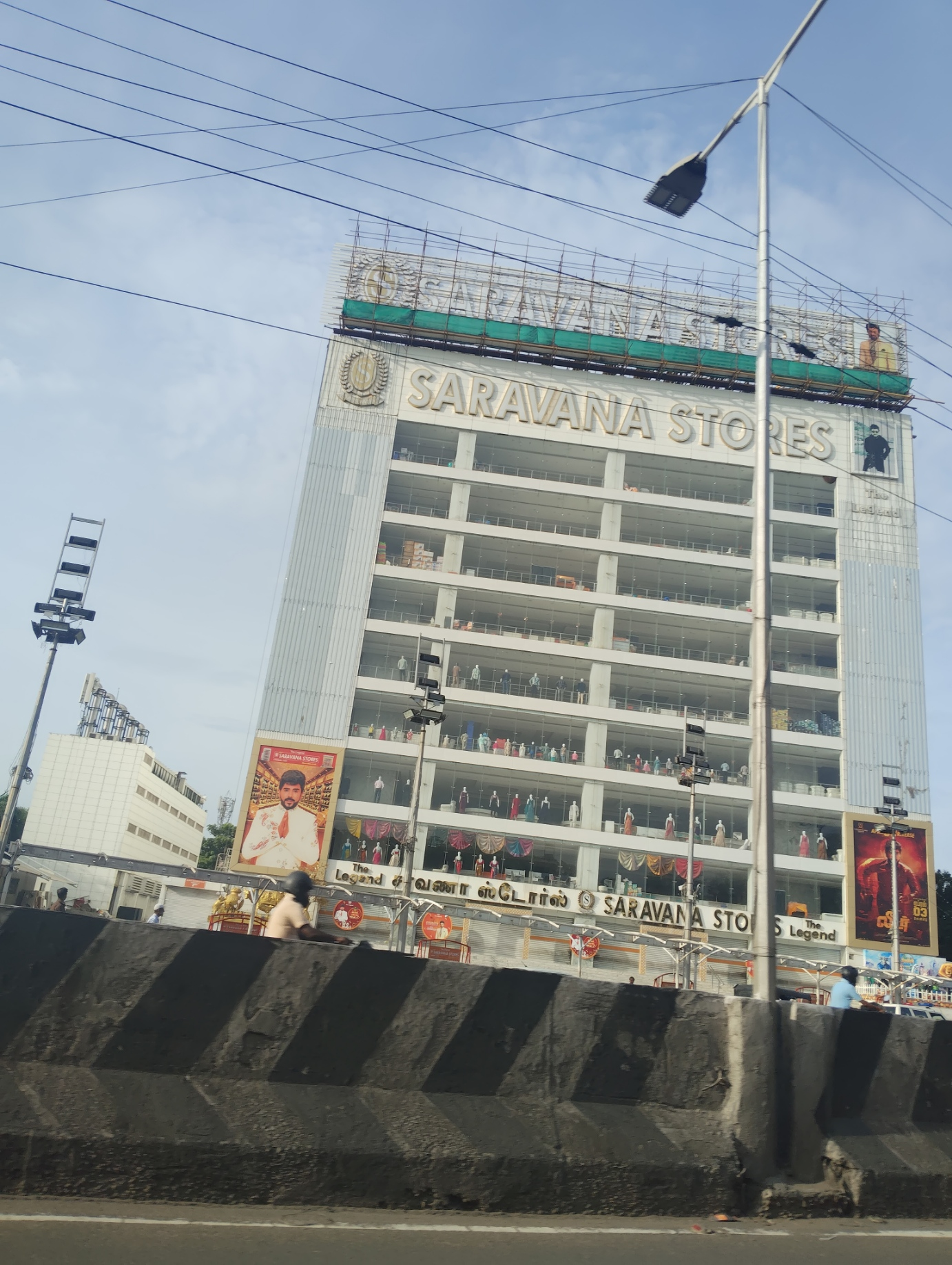
New Legend Saravana Stores, Padi

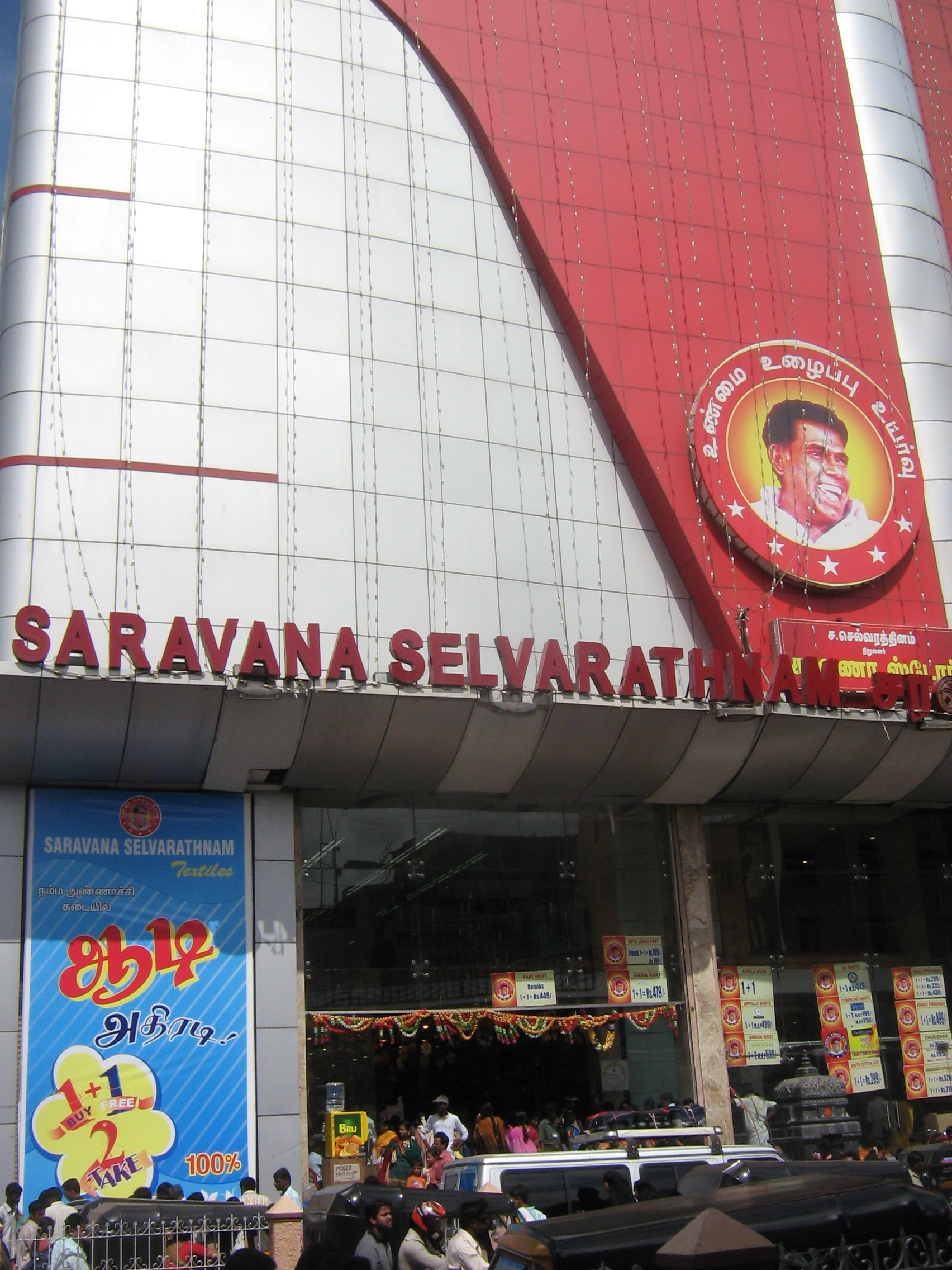
Saravana Selvarathinam Stores, T. Nagar

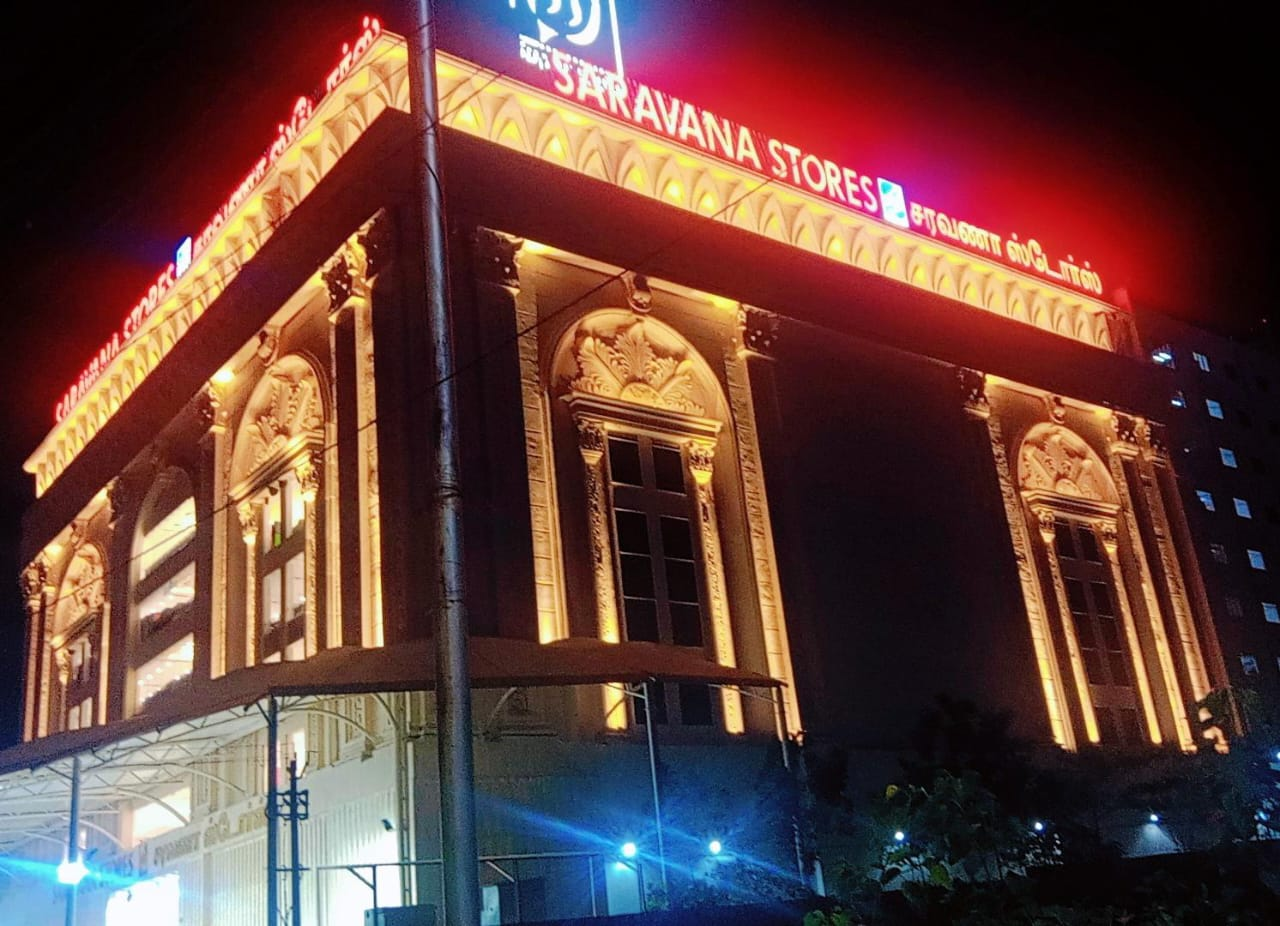
Super Saravana Stores at Madurai
