= Legend Saravanan =

Indian businessman and actor (born 1970)

- Saravanan Arul
- Born: Arul Saravanan Yogarathinam; 7 January 1969 (age 57); Chennai, Tamil Nadu, India
- Occupations: Businessman; Actor; Film producer
- Organization: The Legend New Saravana Stores
- Spouse: Selvi (m. 1991)
- Children: 2
- Parent: Yogarathinam (father)

Arul Saravanan Yogarathinam, professionally known as Legend Saravanan, is an Indian businessman, actor and film producer who works in Tamil cinema. He is known for founding the chain of retail stores The Legend New Saravana Stores, which is a part of the largest family-owned business retail chain in India, Saravana Stores.

Saravanan made his debut as an actor and played the lead role in the Tamil-language film The Legend, which premiered in theatres worldwide on 28 July 2022. The film was also bankrolled by his own production studio, The Legend New Saravana Stores Productions.

== Early life and family ==
Saravanan was born in a Tamil Hindu family to S. Yogarathinam, who was the co-founder of the retail chain Saravana Stores and Y.Lakshmi who was a housewife. Saravanan received his primary education in his native Tirunelveli district and pursued his higher education in Chennai. He married Mrs. Selvi in 1991 and had their first daughter S. Yoganya (born 1992) who married R. Surendar in 2012 and their second daughter D. Meenakshi (born 1996) who married R.Deepak Rajan in 2017.

== Career ==
Saravanan began his business career in 1984 by involving in his family-owned retail business chain Saravana Stores along with his father S. Yogarathinam and then in 2005, he went on to start his own set of retail stores under the name, New Saravana Stores Brammandamai. In 2016, the biggest showroom in his retail chain The Legend New Saravana Stores was inaugurated on 6 May 2016 in Padi, Chennai.

Legend Saravanan's acting career started in 2018 when he began to act in the ad films to promote his own retail business. In the same year, he hinted about his wish of becoming a lead actor and about his Tamil cinema entry during the Nadigar Sangam's Natchathira Vizha event in Malaysia, where he handed over a cheque of Rs.2 crores and 50 Lakhs as a donation towards the building construction of the Nadigar Sangam (officially known as the South Indian Artistes Association). In 2018, he donated Rs.1 Crore as relief funds for Cyclone Gaja.

In 2019, he started to act in his debut production movie The Legend, where multiple schedules were shot in Chennai, Pollachi, Manali, and Ukraine. The movie was initially released on 28 July 2022 in theatres worldwide. Although the film was critically panned, it started streaming in the Disney+ Hotstar on 3 March 2023 where it went on to collect more than Rs.60 crore in revenue with its theatrical and OTT release combined.

== Filmography ==
Key
†	Denotes films that have not yet been released

Year	Film	Role	Notes	Ref.
2022	The Legend	Dr. Saravanan	Lead actor and producer	
2026	Leader	Sakthivel (Ponmaran)	Lead actor and producer	
